= Mountain states =

Region of the United States

Mountain
- Region
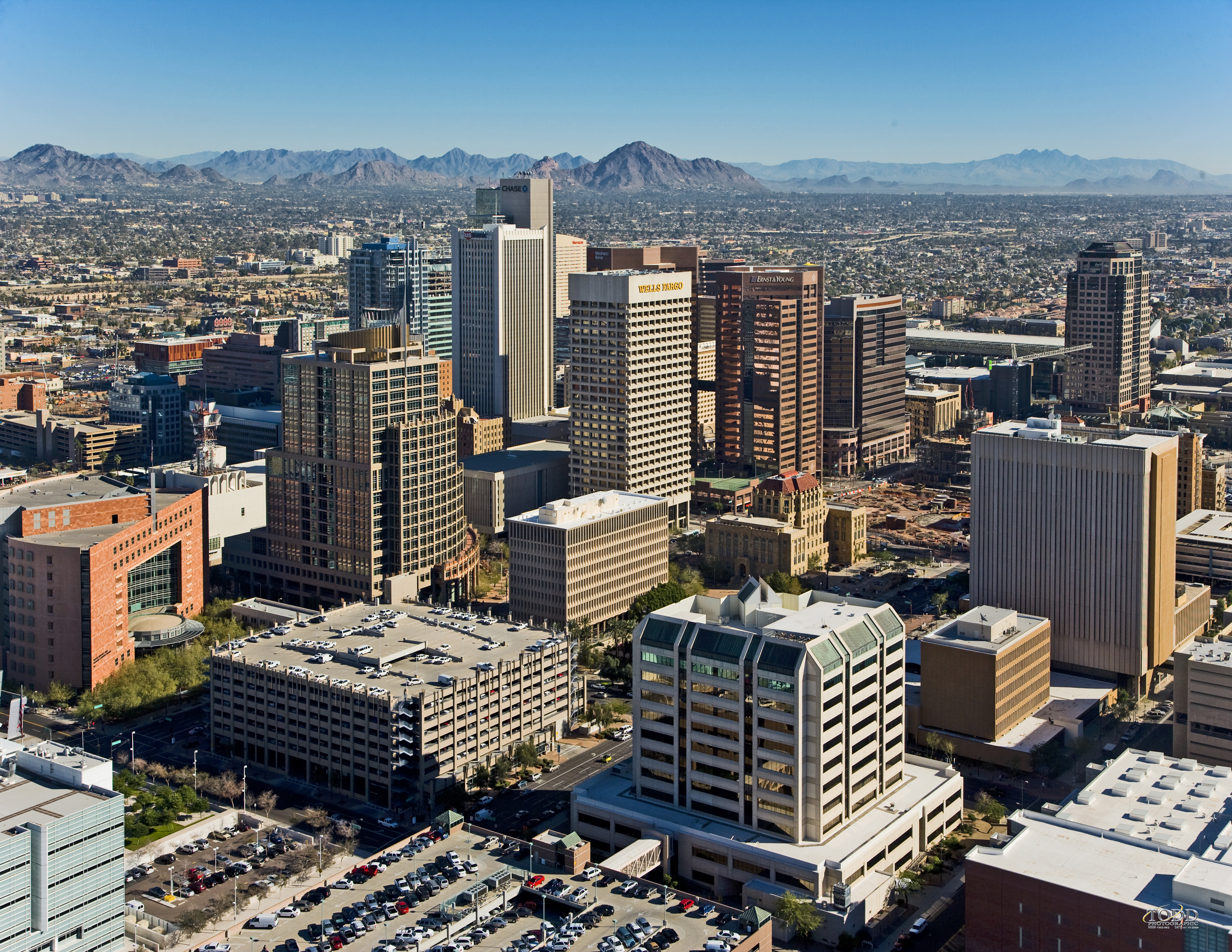
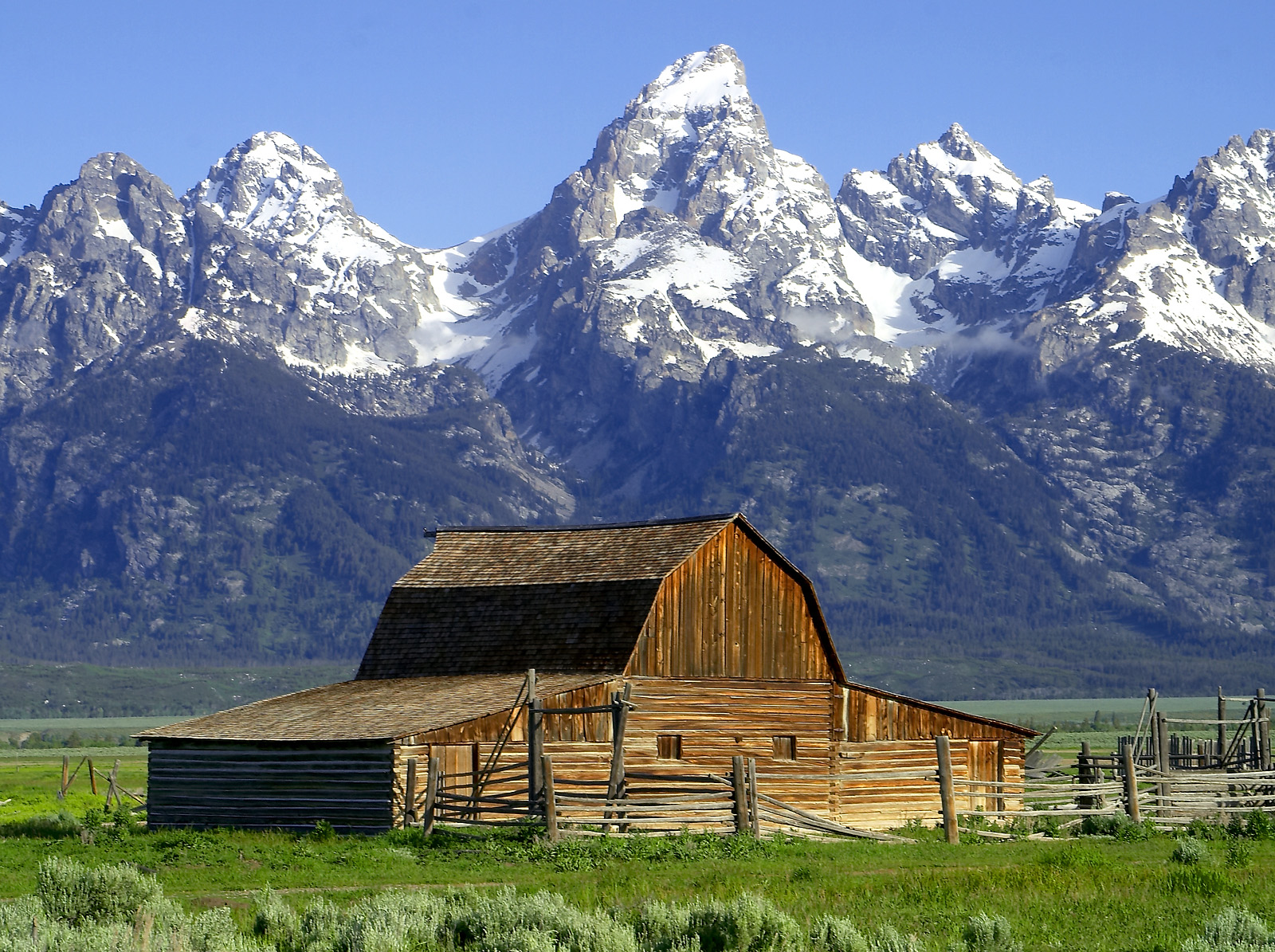
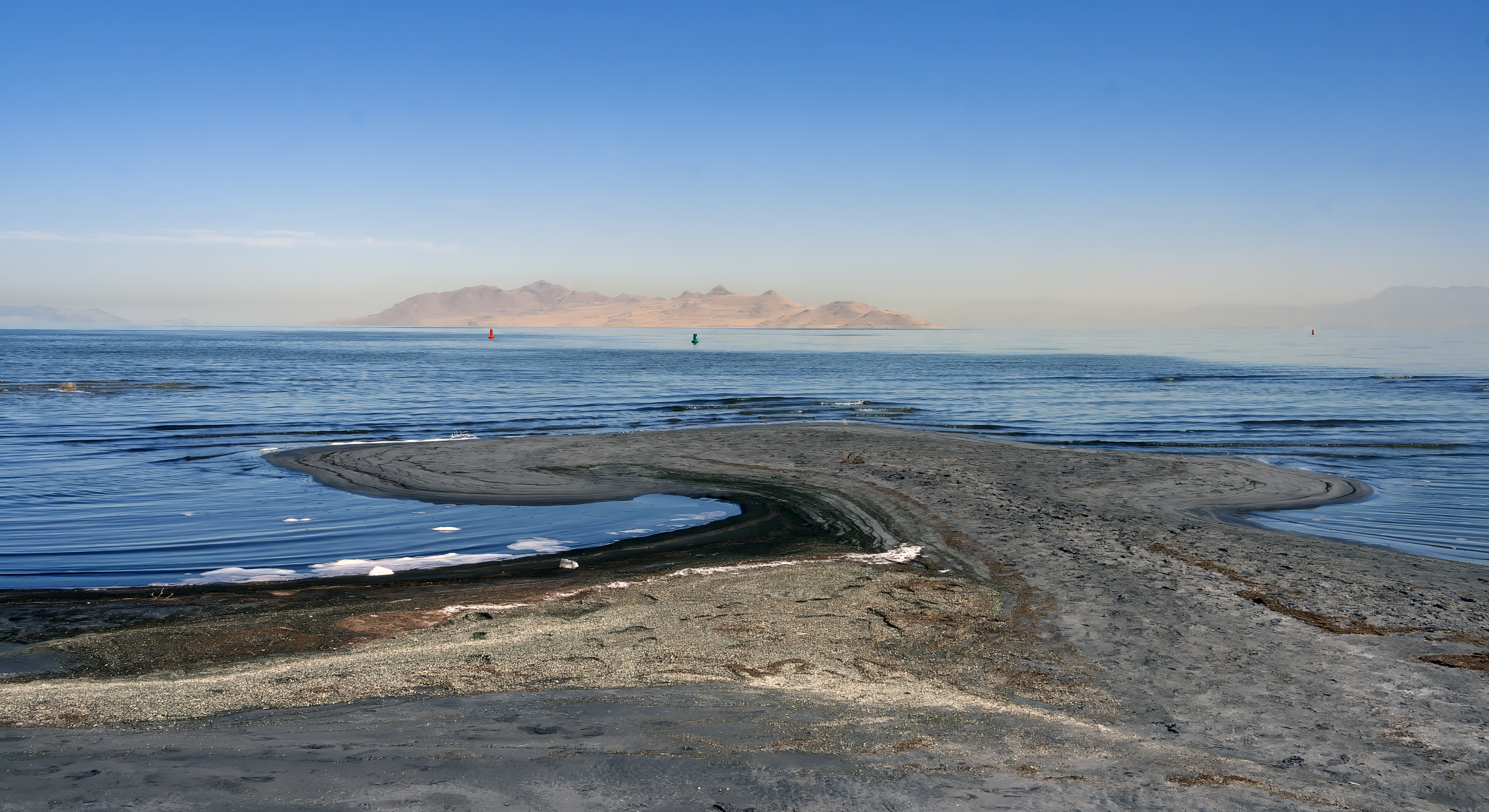
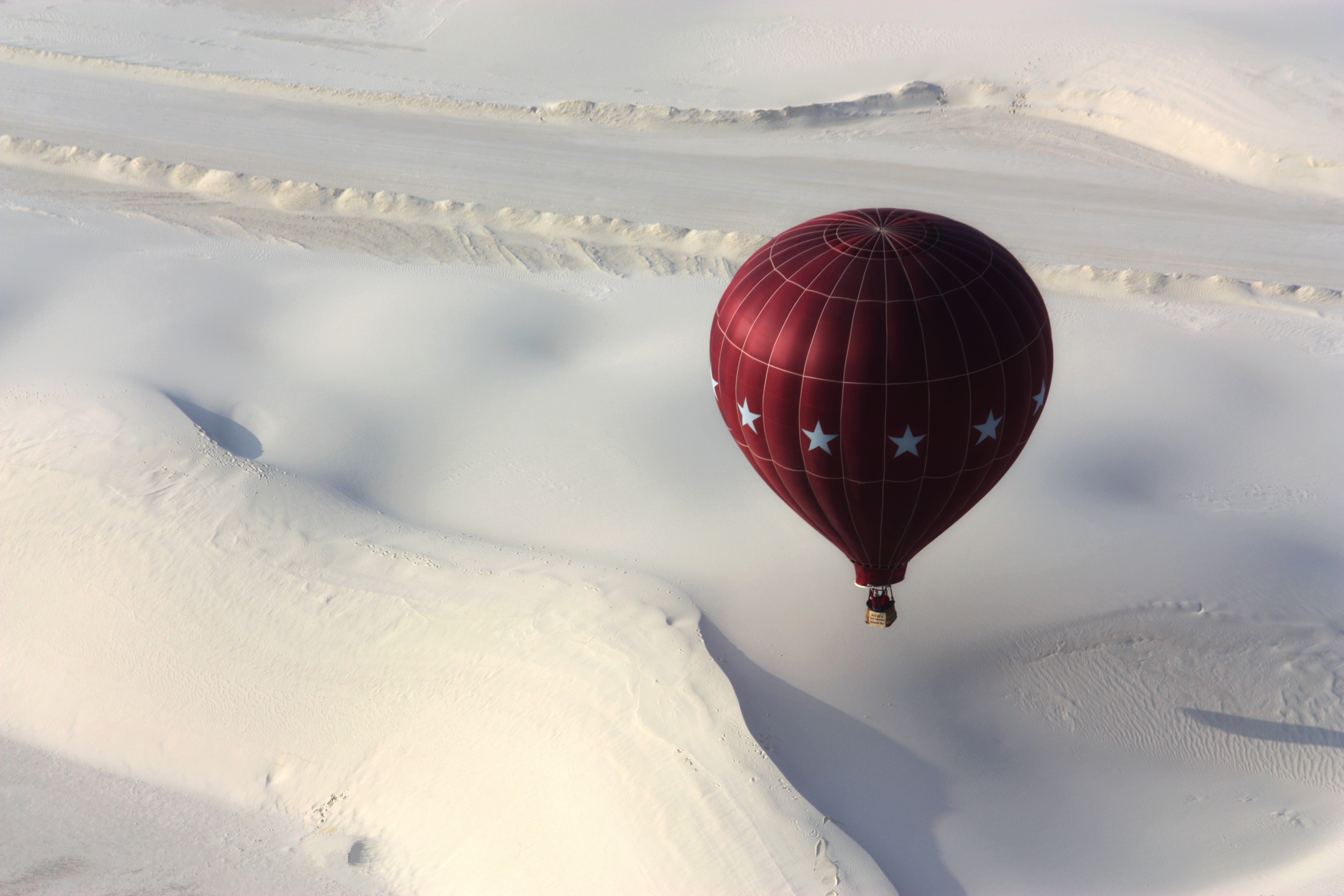
- Phoenix Teton Range Great Salt Lake Denver White Sands National Park Idaho Falls Idaho Temple Glacier National Park

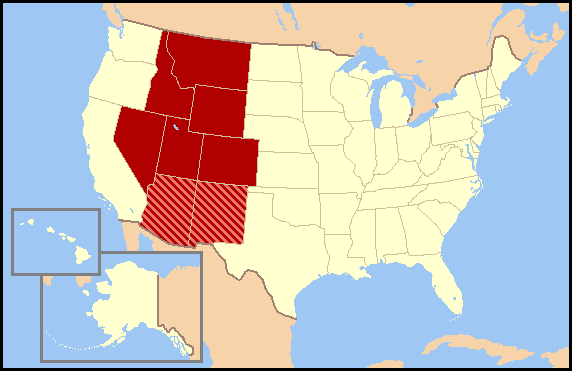
- Regional definitions vary from source to source. The states shown in dark red are always included, while the striped states are usually considered part of the same region called the Mountain States
- Country: United States
- Census Region: Western United States
- Subregions: Southwest, Intermountain, Front Range
- States: Arizona; Colorado; Idaho; Montana; Nevada; New Mexico; Texas (Trans-Pecos Region); Utah; Wyoming
- Largest City: Phoenix

Area
  - Total: 855,767 sq mi (2,216,426 km^{2})
- Highest elevation (Mount Elbert): 14,439 ft (4,401 m)

Population (2020)
  - Total: 24,919,150

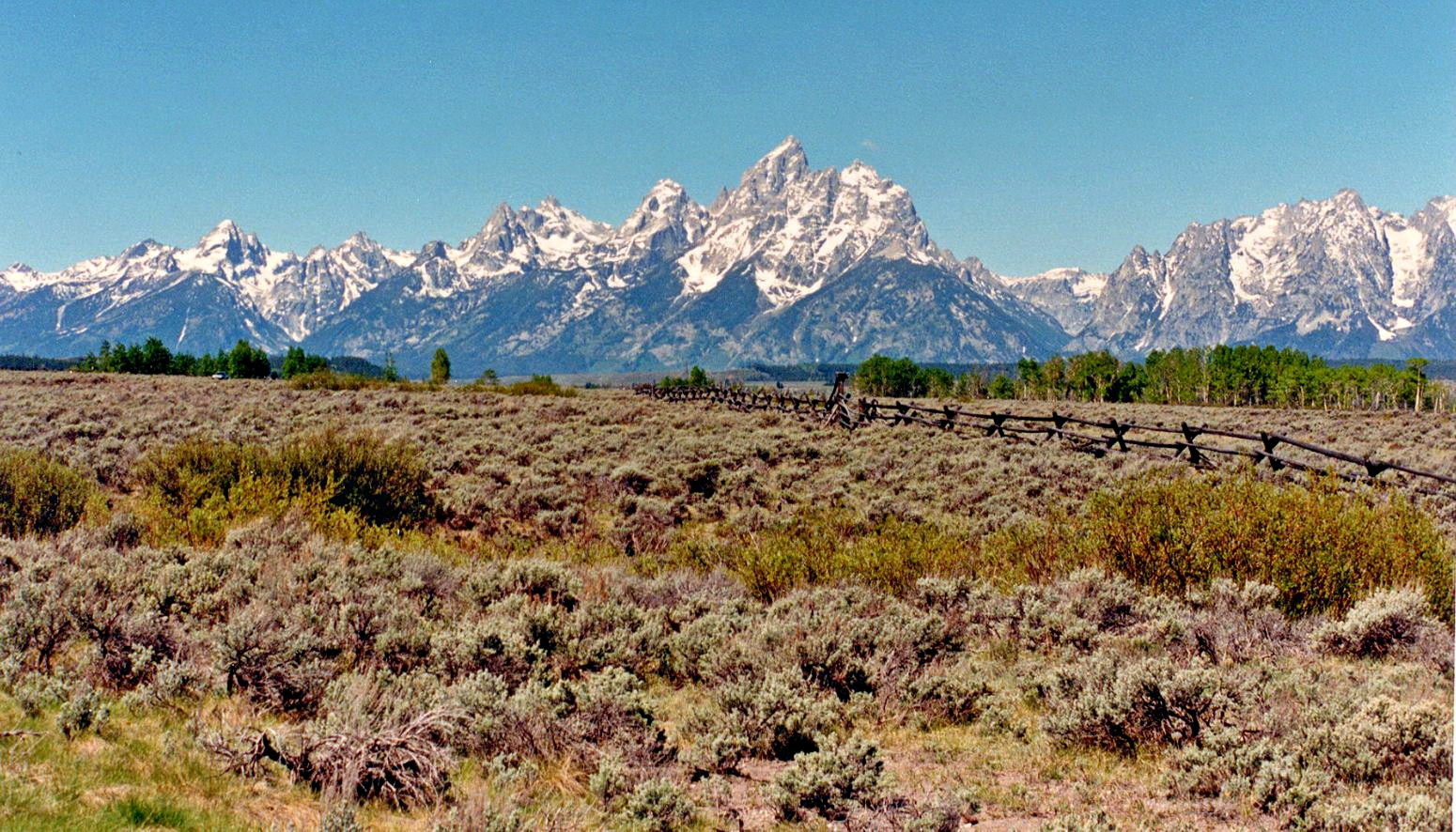
The Teton Mountain Range in Wyoming, a subset of the Rocky Mountains

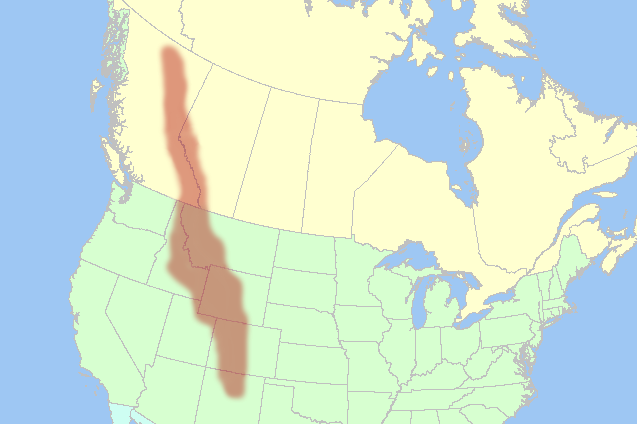
Map of the Rocky Mountains of western North America

The Mountain states (also known as the Mountain West or the Interior West) form one of the nine geographic divisions of the United States that are officially recognized by the United States Census Bureau. It is a subregion of the Western United States.

The Mountain states are considered to include: Arizona, Colorado, Idaho, Montana, Nevada, New Mexico, Utah and Wyoming. The words "Mountain states" generally refer to the U.S. states which encompass the U.S. Rocky Mountains. These are oriented north-south through portions of the states of Montana, Idaho, Wyoming, Colorado, Utah, and New Mexico. Arizona and Nevada, as well as other parts of Utah and New Mexico, have other smaller mountain ranges and scattered mountains located in them as well. Sometimes, the Trans-Pecos area of West Texas is considered part of the region. The land area of the eight states together is some 855,767 square miles (2,216,426 km^{2}).

It is the fastest-growing region in the United States, with Utah, Idaho, Nevada, Colorado, and Arizona ranking among the fastest-growing states in the country. Phoenix is its largest city.

A few subregions exist within this region:

- The Southwest region, consisting of Arizona, New Mexico, Southern Nevada, and Far West Texas
- The Intermountain region, consisting of Utah, Nevada, and Idaho, along with portions of other states
- The Front Range region, consisting of Northern New Mexico, Colorado, and Southeast Wyoming

== Regional geography ==
The Mountain West is one of the largest and most diverse regions in the United States. Most regional boundaries of the Mountain West are often looked at the area from the High Plains to the Sierra Nevada and the Cascade Range. The southern and northern portions of the Mountain West are often split into two separate regions. The southern portion (Arizona and New Mexico) is often called the Southwest region, while the northern portion (Idaho and Montana) is often included in either the Northwest states or called the "Northern Rockies".

== Terrain ==
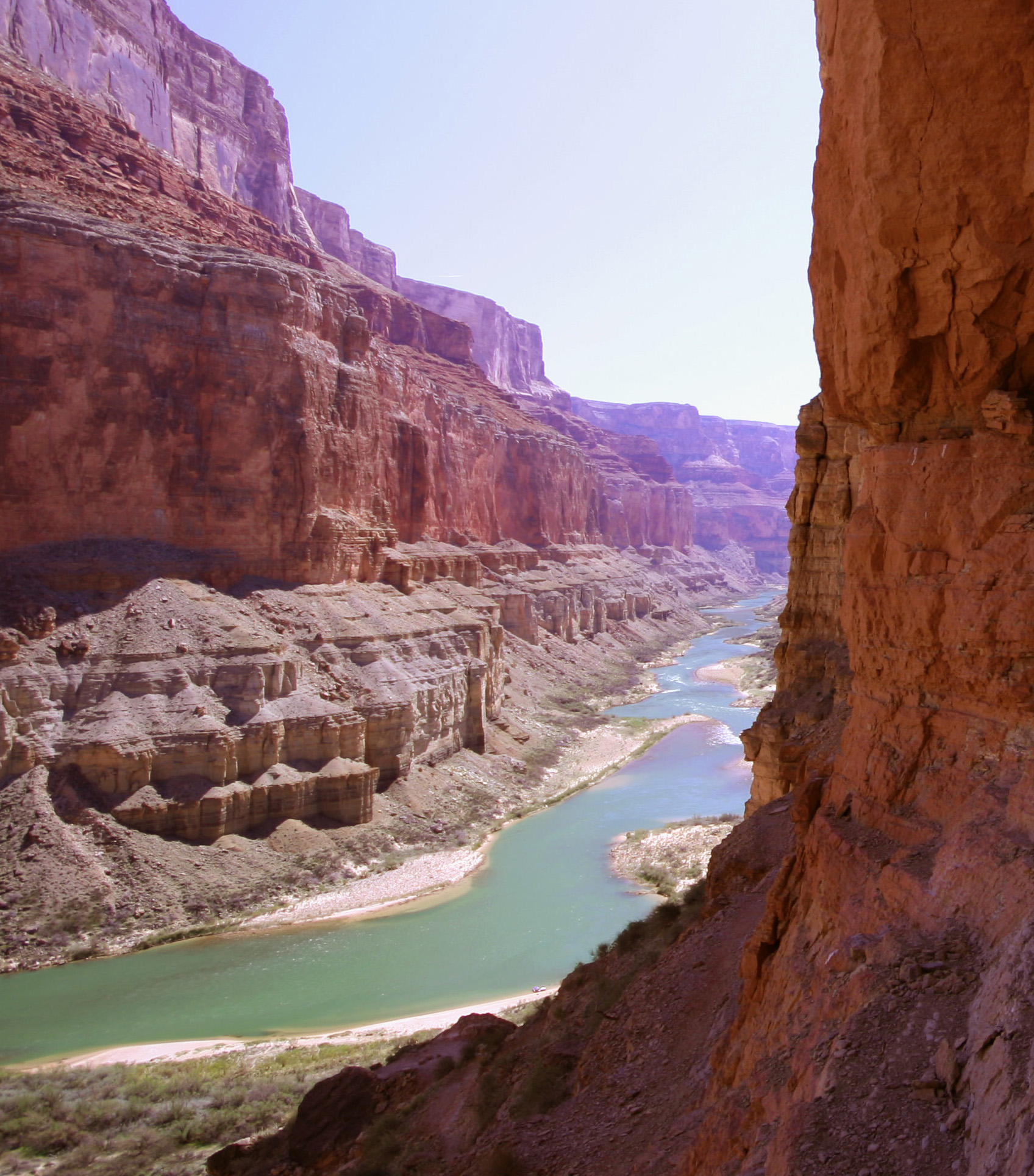
The bottom of the Grand Canyon of the Colorado River in Arizona

Together with the Pacific States of Alaska, California, Hawaii, Oregon, and Washington, the Mountain states constitute the broader region of the West, one of the four regions the United States Census Bureau formally recognizes (the Northeast, South, and Midwest being the other three). The terrain of the Mountain West is more diverse than any other region in the United States. Its physical geography ranges from some of the highest mountain peaks in the continental United States to large desert lands and rolling plains in the eastern portion of the region. The Great Basin Desert is located in almost all of Nevada, western Utah, and southern Idaho. Portions of the Mojave Desert are located in California, but over half of the desert is located in southern Nevada, in the Mountain West. Meanwhile, the Sonoran Desert is located in much of Arizona, and the Chihuahuan Desert is located in most of southwestern and southern New Mexico, including White Sands and Jornada del Muerto. Colorado also has scattered desert lands in the southern and northwestern portions of the state, including the expansive San Luis Valley.

Colorado, New Mexico, Utah, and Arizona have other smaller desert lands, part of the Colorado Plateau. The Painted Desert is located in northern and northeastern Arizona, and the San Rafael Desert is located in eastern Utah. New Mexico has other desert lands located in the northern and northwest. Colorado has large desert lands on the colorado plateau in the northwestern, western, and southern parts of the state. These desert lands in Colorado are located in and around areas such as Royal Gorge, Great Sand Dunes National Park, Pueblo, the San Luis Valley, Cortez, Dove Creek, Delta, Canyons of the Ancients National Monument, the Roan Plateau, Dinosaur National Monument, Colorado National Monument, and the Grand Mesa. The San Luis Valley is the largest high valley desert in the world.

In the far-eastern portions of the Mountain West are the High Plains, a portion of the Great Plains. These plains mainly consist of flat rolling land, with scattered buttes, canyons, and forests located in these areas. The High Plains receive very little rainfall, and sit at high elevations, usually about 3,000 to 6,000 feet (910 to 1,830 m). Many people view the High Plains as the point where one begins to enter the greater Mountain West region.

Mountain ranges are located throughout the Mountain West, although the highest mountains are located in the Southern Rocky Mountains of Colorado.

The 10 highest summits of the Mountain West
Rank	Mountain peak	State	Mountain range	Elevation	Prominence	Isolation	Location
1	Mount Elbert (Note: The summit of Mount Elbert is the highest point of the U.S. State of Colorado, the Rocky Mountains of North America, and the entire Mississippi River drainage basin.)	Colorado	Sawatch Range	14,440 ft 4401.2 m	9,093 ft 2772 m	671 mi 1,079 km	39.1178°N 106.4454°W
2	Mount Massive (Note: Mount Massive is the second highest major summit of the Rocky Mountains.) (Note: The elevation of Mount Massive includes an adjustment of +2.087 m (6.85 ft) from NGVD 29 to NAVD 88.)	Colorado	Sawatch Range	14,424 ft 4396.3 m	1,978 ft 603 m	5.1 mi 8.21 km	39.1178°N 106.4454°W
3	Mount Harvard (Note: The summit of Mount Harvard is the highest point of the Collegiate Peaks.) (Note: Mount Harvard is the southernmost and easternmost summit of its elevation in the Rocky Mountains.)	Colorado	Sawatch Range	14,421 ft 4395.6 m	2,360 ft 719 m	14.92 mi 24 km	38.9244°N 106.3207°W
4	Blanca Peak (Note: The summit of Blanca Peak is the highest point of the Sangre de Cristo Mountains and the entire Rio Grande drainage basin.) (Note: Blanca Peak is the southernmost ultra-prominent summit of the Rocky Mountains.) (Note: The elevation of Blanca Peak includes an adjustment of +1.755 m (5.76 ft) from NGVD 29 to NAVD 88.)	Colorado	Sangre de Cristo Mountains	14,351 ft 4374.1 m	5,326 ft 1623 m	103.4 mi 166.4 km	37.5775°N 105.4856°W
5	La Plata Peak (Note: The elevation of La Plata Peak includes an adjustment of +1.983 m (6.51 ft) from NGVD 29 to NAVD 88.)	Colorado	Sawatch Range	14,343 ft 4371.6 m	1,836 ft 560 m	6.28 mi 10.11 km	39.0294°N 106.4729°W
6	Uncompahgre Peak (Note: The summit of Uncompahgre Peak is the highest point of the San Juan Mountains and the entire Gulf of California drainage basin.) (Note: Uncompahgre Peak is the westernmost summit of its elevation in the Rocky Mountains.)	Colorado	San Juan Mountains	14,321 ft 4365 m	4,277 ft 1304 m	85 mi 136.8 km	38.0717°N 107.4621°W
7	Crestone Peak (Note: The summit of Crestone Peak is the highest point of the Crestones.) (Note: The elevation of Crestone Peak includes an adjustment of +1.76 m (5.77 ft) from NGVD 29 to NAVD 88.)	Colorado	Sangre de Cristo Range	14,300 ft 4358.6 m	4,554 ft 1388 m	27.4 mi 44 km	37.9669°N 105.5855°W
8	Mount Lincoln (Note: The summit of Mount Lincoln is the highest point of the Mosquito Range and the entire Missouri River drainage basin.) (Note: Mount Lincoln is the northernmost summit of its elevation in the Rocky Mountains.)	Colorado	Mosquito Range	14,293 ft 4356.5 m	3,862 ft 1177 m	22.5 mi 36.2 km	39.3515°N 106.1116°W
9	Castle Peak (Note: The summit of Castle Peak is the highest point of the Elk Mountains.)	Colorado	Elk Mountains	14,279 ft 4352.2 m	2,365 ft 721 m	20.9 mi 33.6 km	39.0097°N 106.8614°W
10	Grays Peak (Note: The summit of Grays Peak is the highest point of the Front Range and the Continental Divide in North America.) (Note: Grays Peak is the northernmost summit of its elevation in the Rocky Mountains.)	Colorado	Front Range	14,278 ft 4352 m	2,770 ft 844 m	25 mi 40.2 km	39.6339°N 105.8176°W

== Climate ==
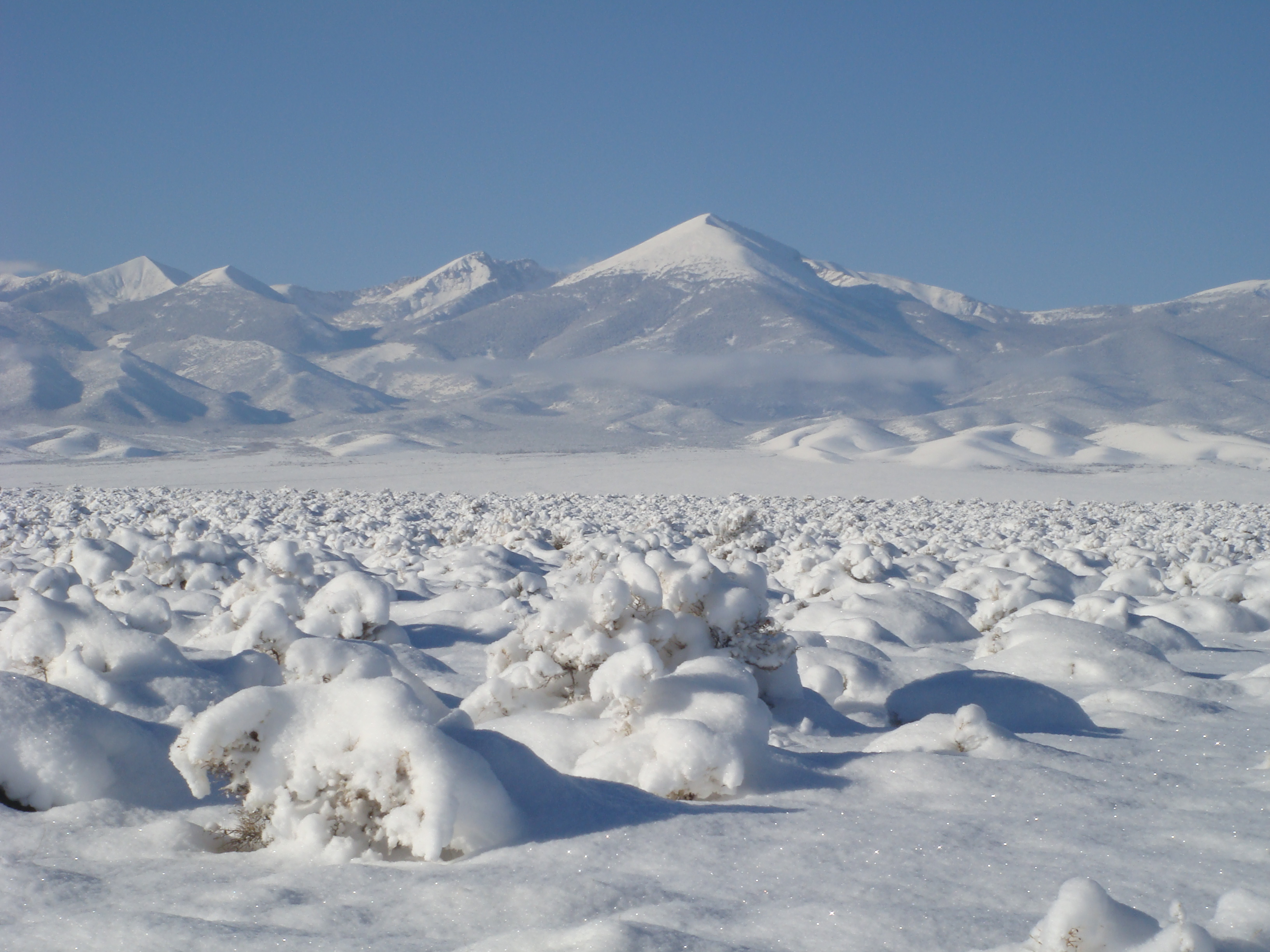
Snow on the Great Basin Desert of Nevada

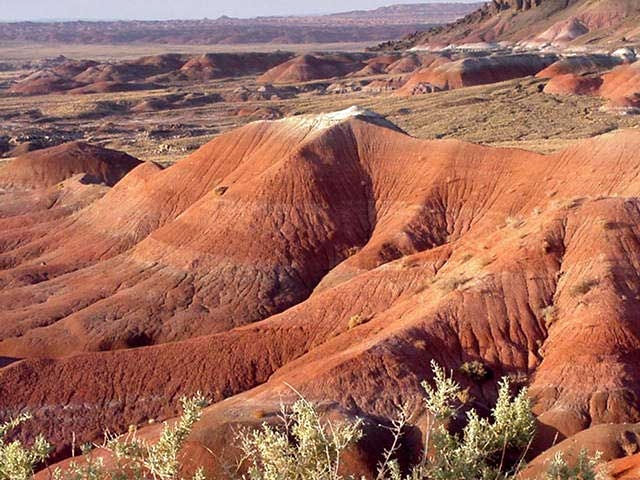
The Painted Desert in northeastern Arizona

The climate of the Mountain West is one of the more diverse climates in the United States. The entire region generally features a semi-arid or arid climate, with somе alpine climates in the mountains of each state. Some parts of the tall mountains can receive very large amounts of snow and rain, while other parts of the region received very little rain, and virtually no snow at all. The High Plains in the eastern portion of the region receive moderate snowfalls, but very little rain.

The states of Nevada and Arizona are generally filled with desert lands and scattered mountain ranges. Much of Nevada receives little to no snow in the southern portion of the state, while northern Nevada can receive large amounts of snow in and around the mountains, and even in the desert lands in Nevada. Arizona generally receives little rain or snow, but high elevations in and near mountains receive extremely large amounts of rain and snow. Northern and northeastern Arizona display characteristics of a "High Desert", where the summers are very hot and dry, while the winters can become very cold, and it can snow as well.

Utah is also generally large desert lands, with mountains as well. However, the desert lands in Utah receive significant snowfall, and there are large amounts of snowfall on and around the mountains. Colorado and New Mexico have very similar climates. Both states can receive significant snowfalls off the mountains, while the mountains in both states receive extremely large amounts of snow. However, southern and southwestern New Mexico generally does not receive much snow at all, similar to southern Nevada and southern Arizona. The desert lands found in northeastern Arizona, eastern Utah, northern New Mexico, and western and southern Colorado are generally referred to as the "High Desert" lands.

The northern portion of the Mountain West tends to be a bit cooler than the southwestern areas. Idaho and Montana both receive significant snowfalls off the mountains and very large snowfalls in the mountains. The High Desert also exists in the northern Mountain West. Southeastern Oregon and southern Idaho have the Great Basin Desert lands located in them, which is part of the high desert.

The eight Mountain states have the highest mean elevations of all 50 U.S. states.

== States ==
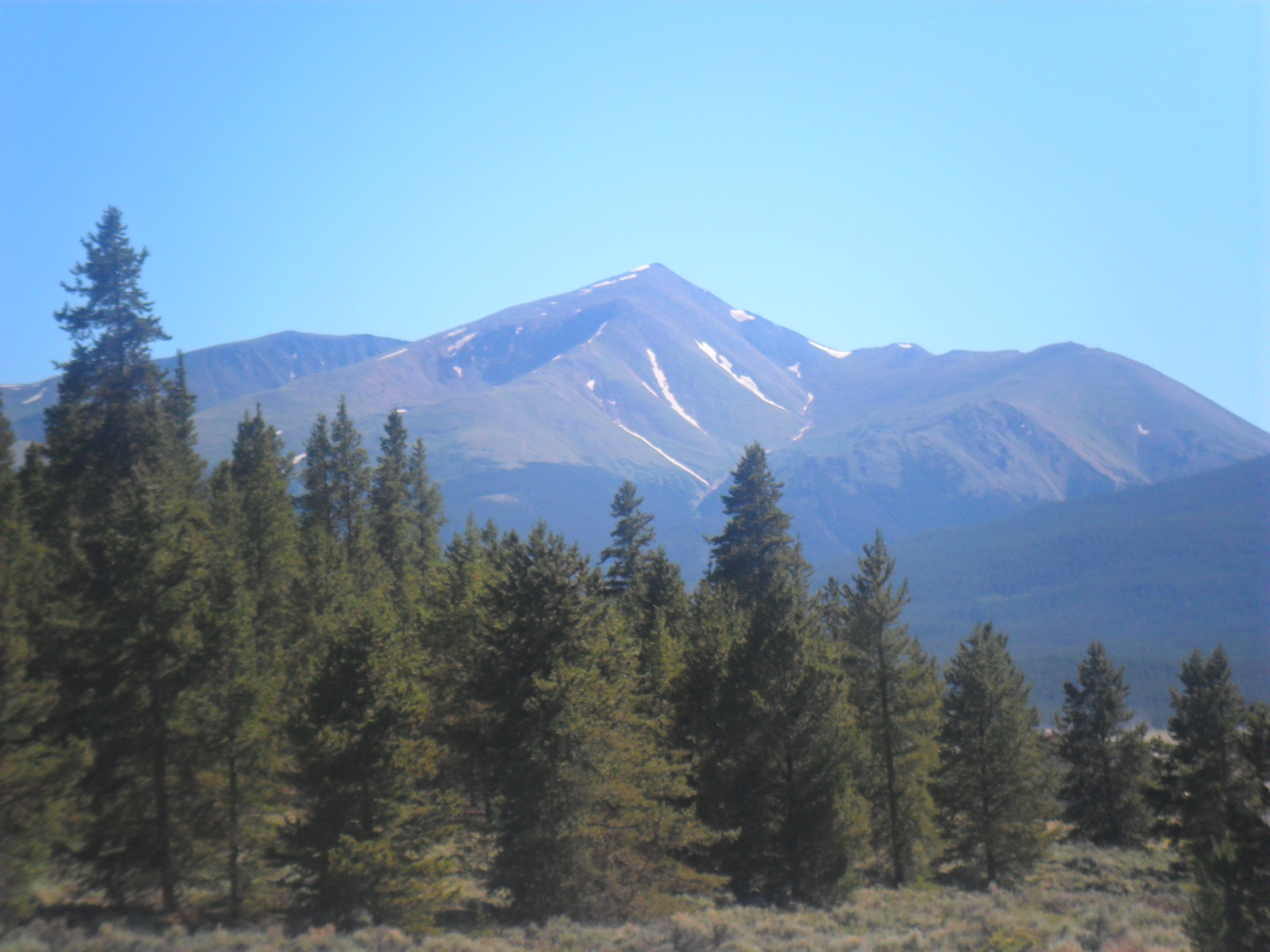
Mount Elbert in the Sawatch Range of Colorado is the highest peak of the Rocky Mountains and the Mountain states.

The Mountain states by mean elevation
Rank	State	Highest point	Highest elevation	Lowest point	Lowest elevation	Mean elevation	Elevation span
1	Colorado	Mount Elbert	14,440 ft 4401 m	Arikaree River at Kansas border	3,317 ft 1011 m	6,800 ft 2073 m	11,123 ft 3390 m
2	Wyoming	Gannett Peak	13,809 ft 4209 m	Belle Fourche River at South Dakota border	3,100 ft 945 m	6,693 ft 2040 m	10,709 ft 3264 m
3	Utah	Kings Peak	13,518 ft 4120 m	Beaver Dam Wash at Arizona border	2,180 ft 664 m	6,100 ft 1859 m	11,338 ft 3456 m.
4	New Mexico	Wheeler Peak	13,167 ft 4013 m	Red Bluff on Texas border	2,842 ft 866 m	5,700 ft 1737 m	10,325 ft 3147 m
5	Nevada	Boundary Peak	13,147 ft 4007 m	Colorado River at California border	479 ft 146 m	5,500 ft 1676 m	12,668 ft 3861 m
6	Idaho	Borah Peak	12,668 ft 3861 m	Snake River at Washington border	710 ft 216 m	5,000 ft 1524 m	11,958 ft 3645 m
7	Arizona	Humphreys Peak	12,637 ft 3852 m	Colorado River at Sonora border	70 ft 21 m	4,100 ft 1250 m	12,567 ft 3830 m
8	Montana	Granite Peak	12,807 ft 3904 m	Kootenai River at Idaho border.	1,800 ft 549 m	3,400 ft 1036 m	11,007 ft 3355 m
Mountain states		Mount Elbert	14,440 ft 4401 m	Colorado River at Sonora border.	70 ft 21 m	5,400 ft 1646 m.	14,370 ft 4380 m.

== Demographics ==
The Phoenix metropolitan area is the most populous metropolitan area of the Mountain states, followed by Denver, Las Vegas, and Salt Lake City. Phoenix is also the most populous city.

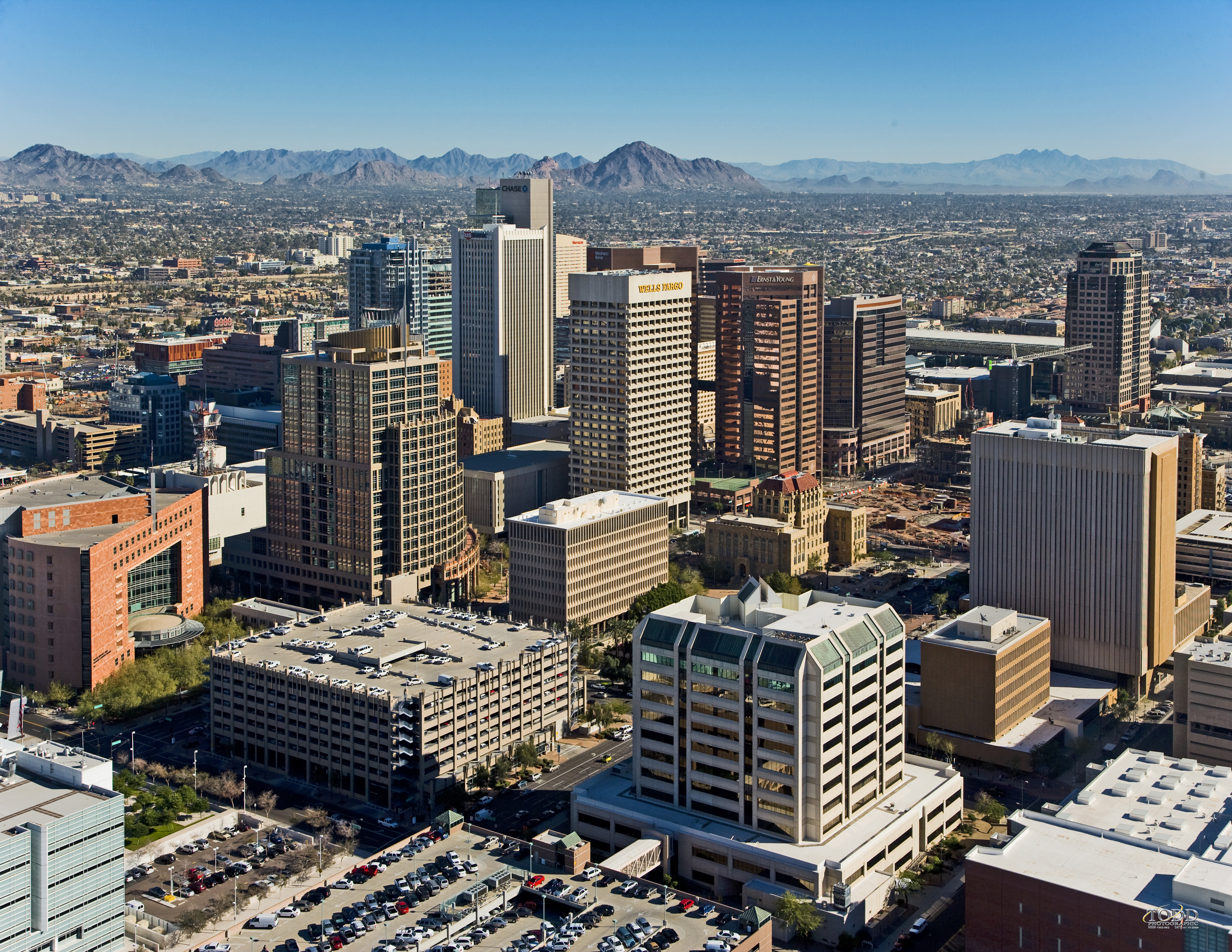
Downtown Phoenix

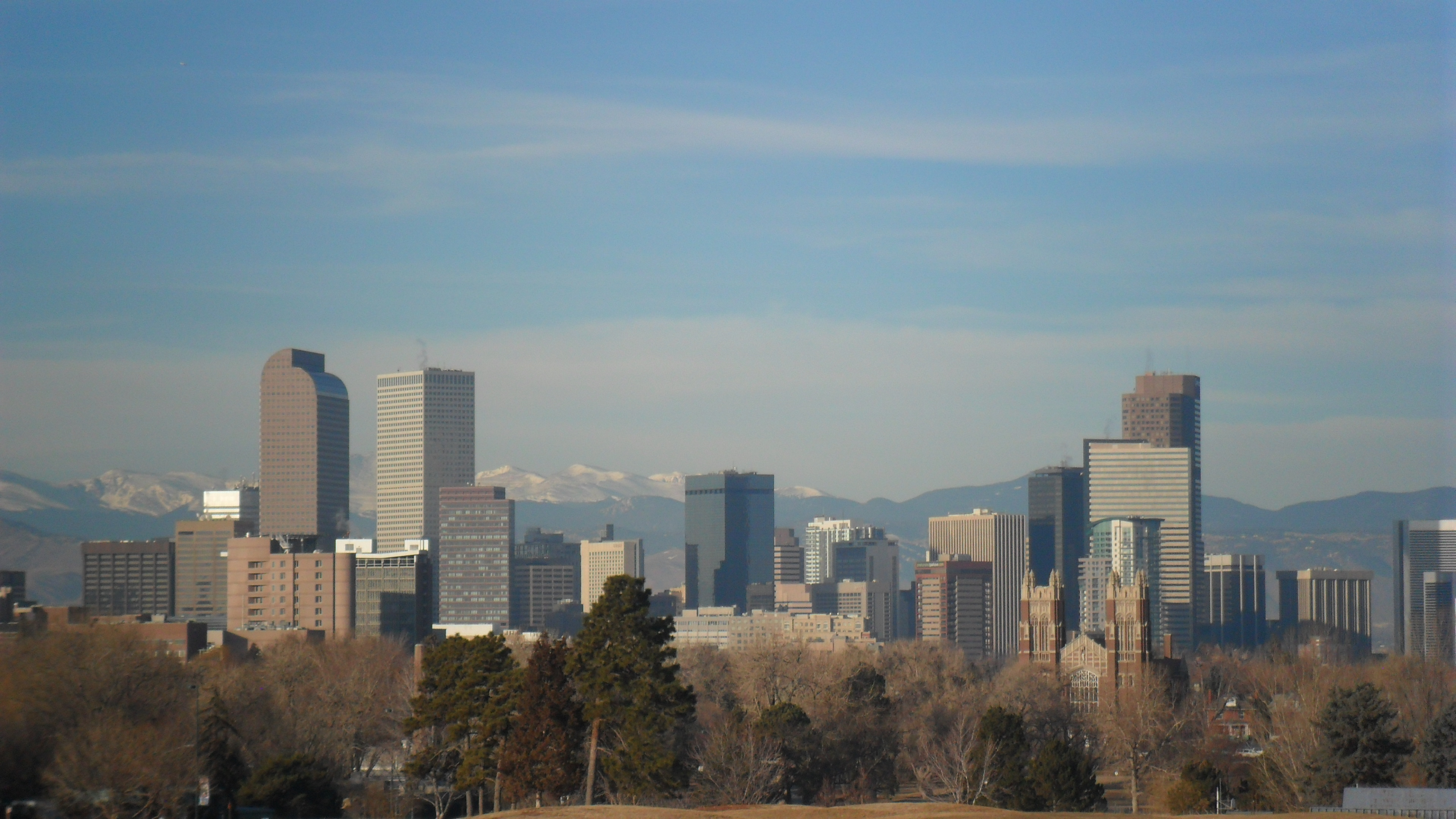
Downtown Denver

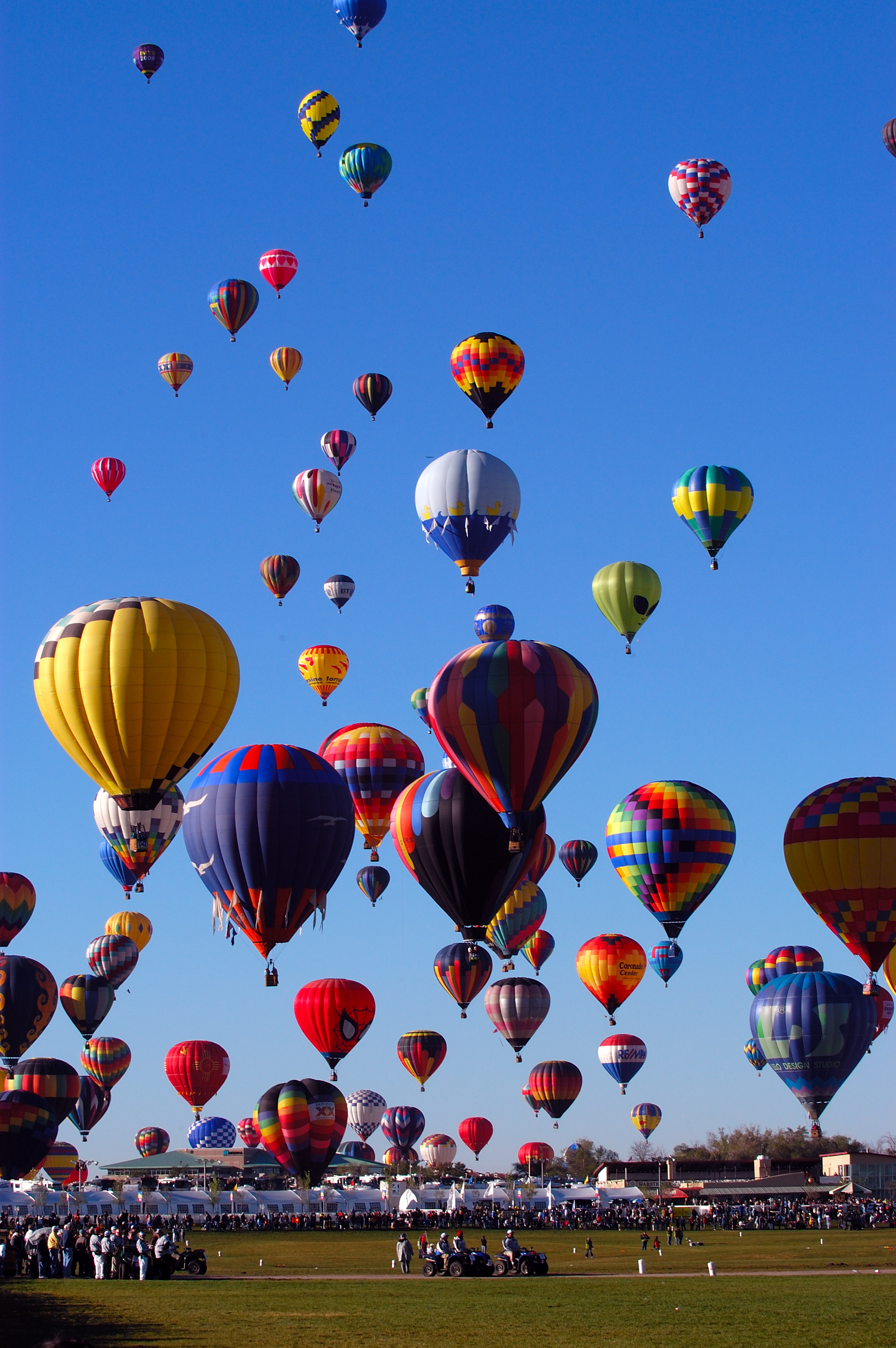
The Albuquerque International Balloon Fiesta

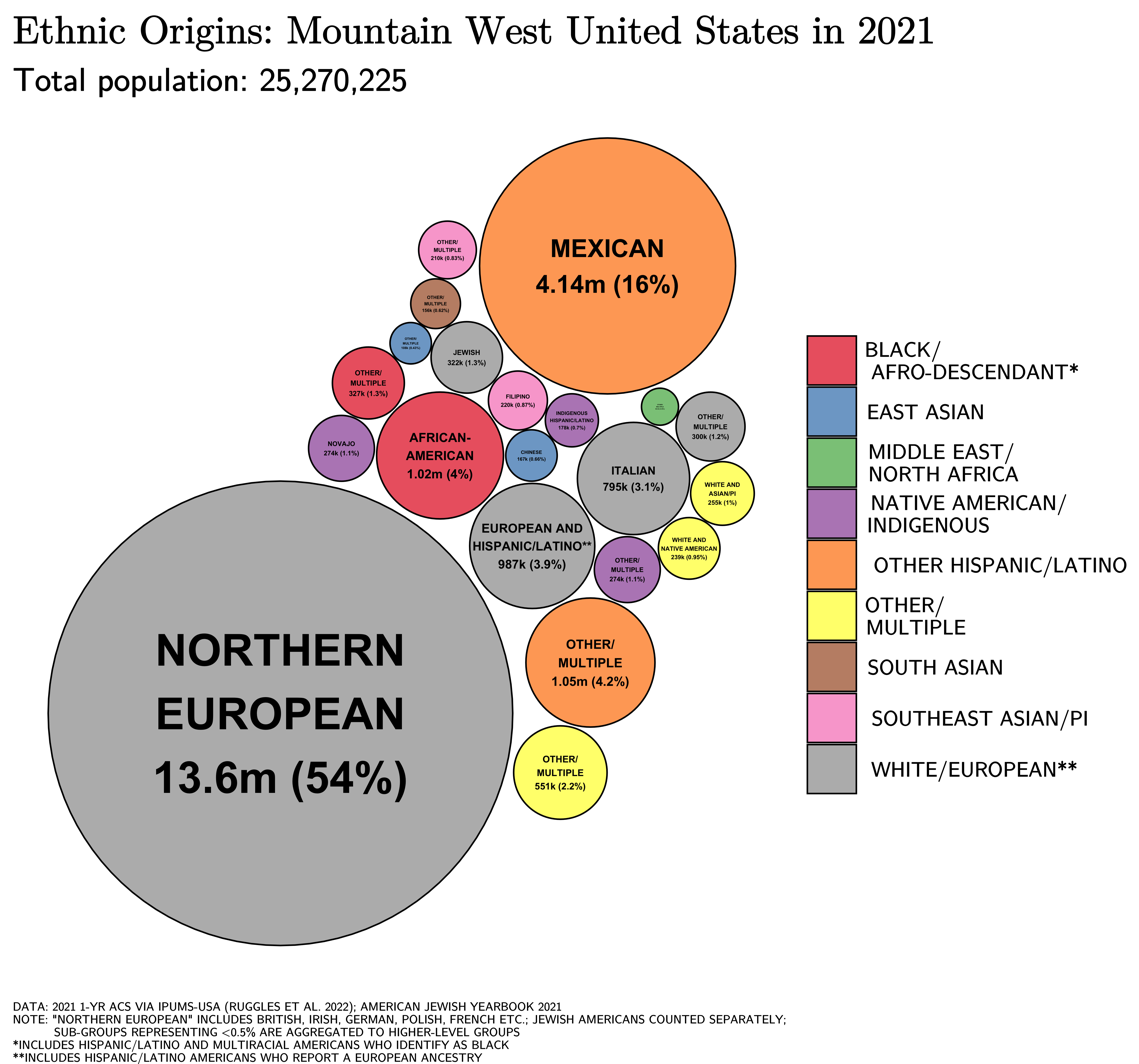
Ethnic origins in Mountain West

The following table is a ranking of cities within the Mountain states region, by city population.

The 30 most populous cities of the Mountain states
Rank	City	State	2020 pop	2010 pop	Change
1	Phoenix	Arizona	1,608,139	1,445,632	+11.24%
2	Denver	Colorado	715,522	600,158	+19.22%
3	Las Vegas	Nevada	641,903	583,756	+9.96%
4	Albuquerque	New Mexico	564,559	545,852	+3.43%
5	Tucson	Arizona	542,629	520,116	+4.33%
6	Mesa	Arizona	504,258	439,041	+14.85%
7	Colorado Springs	Colorado	478,961	416,427	+15.02%
8	Aurora	Colorado	386,261	325,078	+18.82%
9	Henderson	Nevada	317,610	257,729	+23.23%
10	Chandler	Arizona	275,987	236,123	+16.88%
11	Gilbert	Arizona	267,918	208,453	+28.53%
12	Reno	Nevada	264,165	225,221	+17.29%
13	North Las Vegas	Nevada	262,527	216,961	+21.00%
14	Glendale	Arizona	248,325	226,721	+9.53%
15	Scottsdale	Arizona	241,361	217,385	+11.03%
16	Boise	Idaho	235,684	205,671	+14.59%
17	Salt Lake City	Utah	199,723	186,440	+7.12%
18	Peoria	Arizona	190,985	154,065	+23.96%
19	Tempe	Arizona	180,587	161,719	+11.67%
20	Fort Collins	Colorado	169,810	143,986	+17.94%
21	Lakewood	Colorado	155,984	142,980	+9.09%
22	Surprise	Arizona	143,148	117,517	+21.81%
23	Thornton	Colorado	141,867	118,772	+19.44%
24	West Valley City	Utah	140,230	129,480	+8.30%
25	Arvada	Colorado	124,402	106,433	+16.88%
26	Meridian	Idaho	117,635	75,092	+56.65%
27	Billings	Montana	117,116	104,170	+12.43%
28	West Jordan	Utah	116,961	103,712	+12.77%
29	Westminster	Colorado	116,317	106,114	+9.62%
30	Provo	Utah	115,162	112,488	+2.38%

== Census statistical areas ==
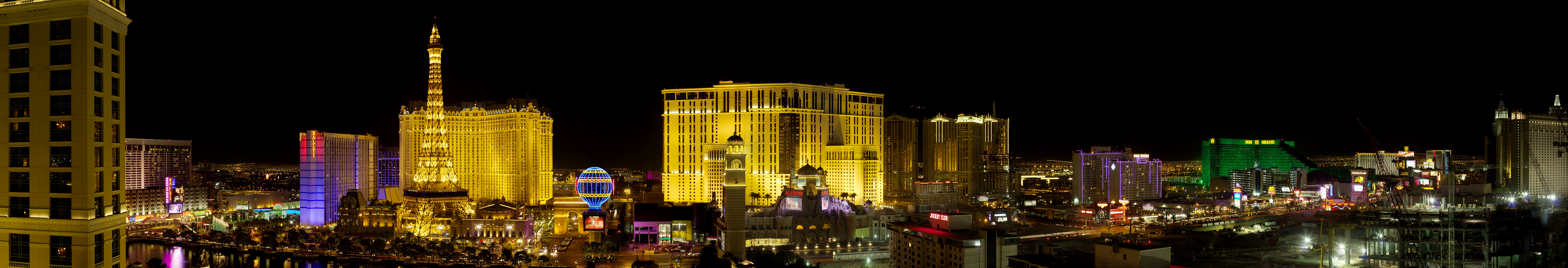
The Las Vegas Strip

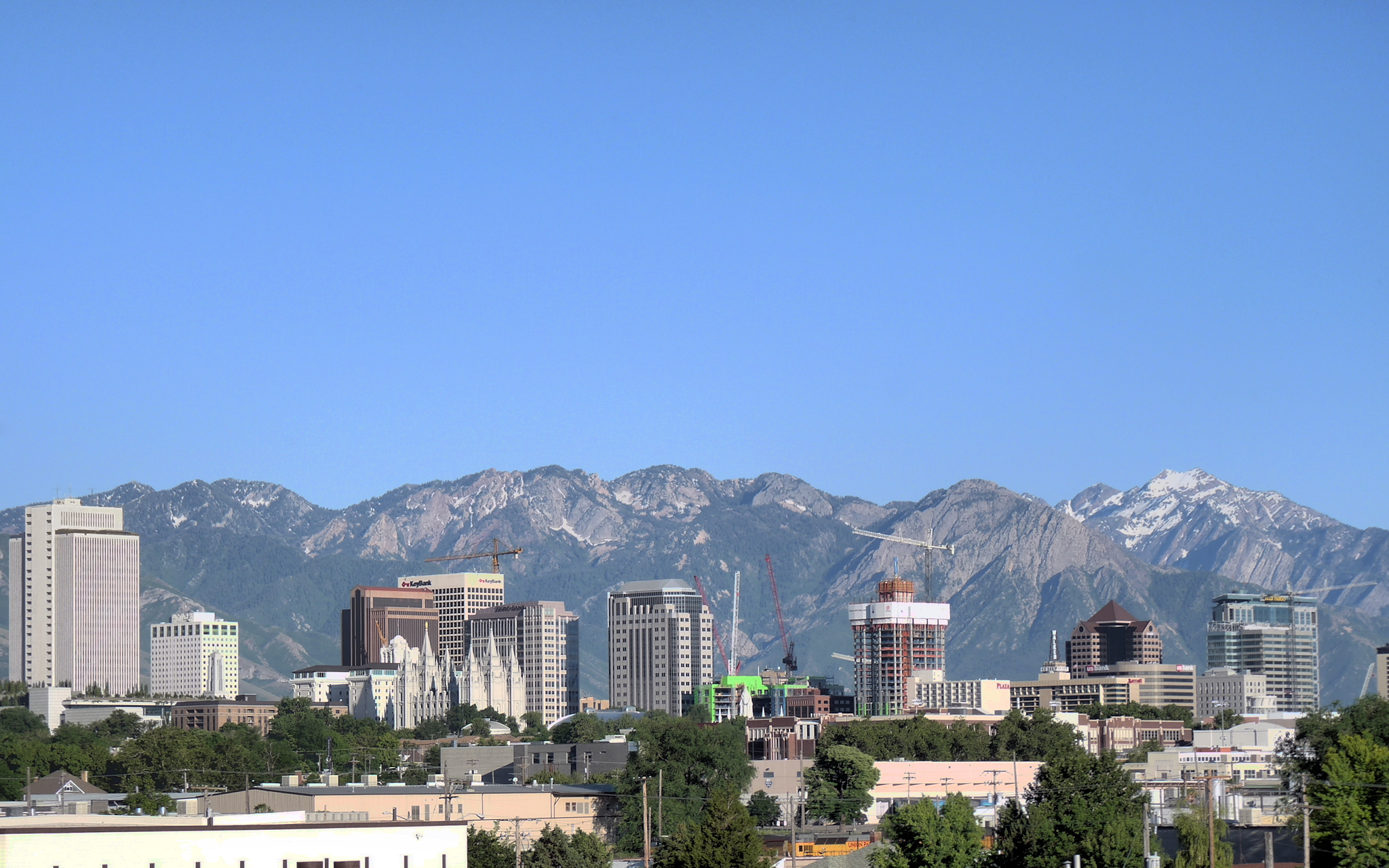
The skyline of Salt Lake City

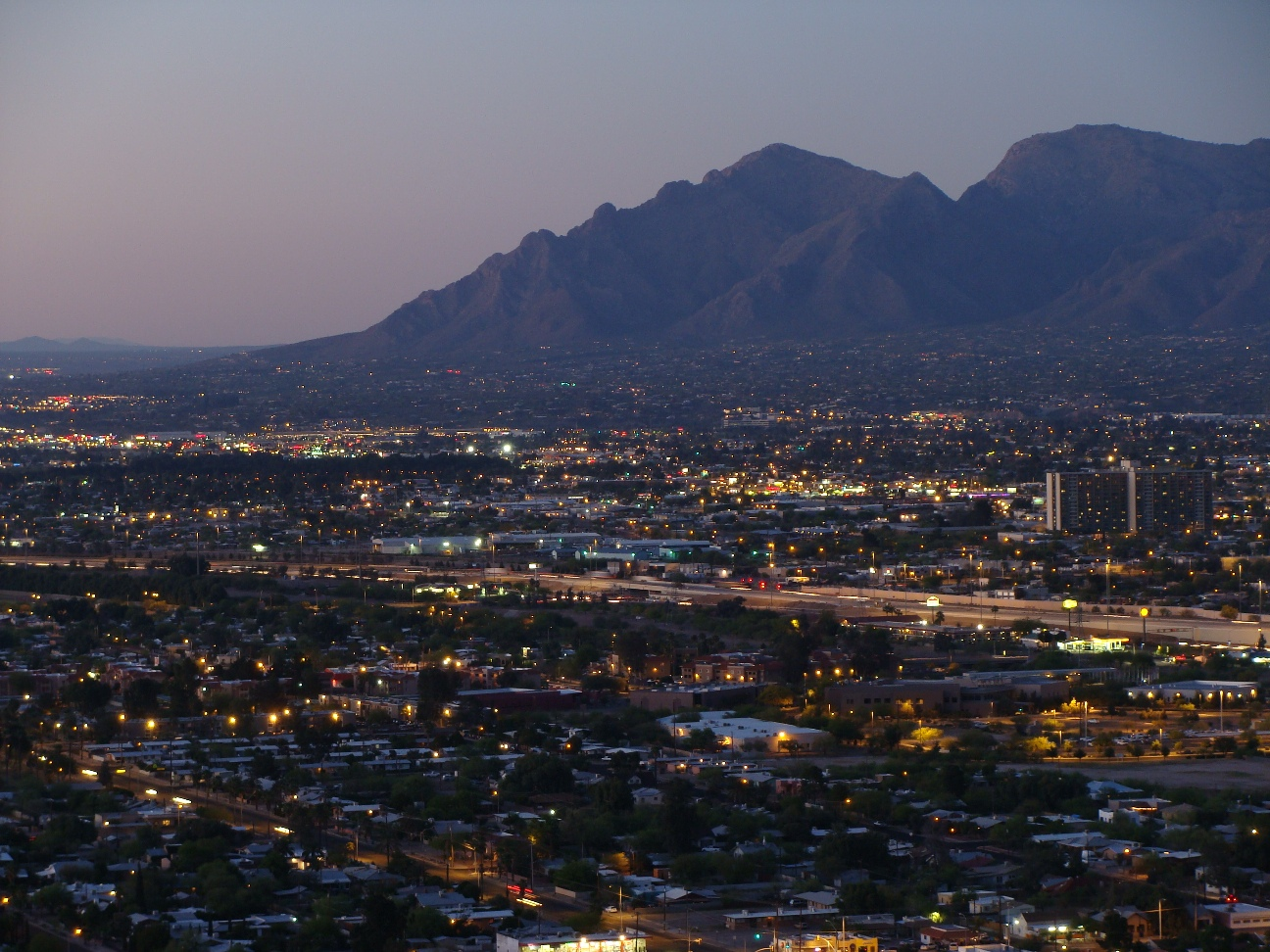
Evening comes to Tucson.

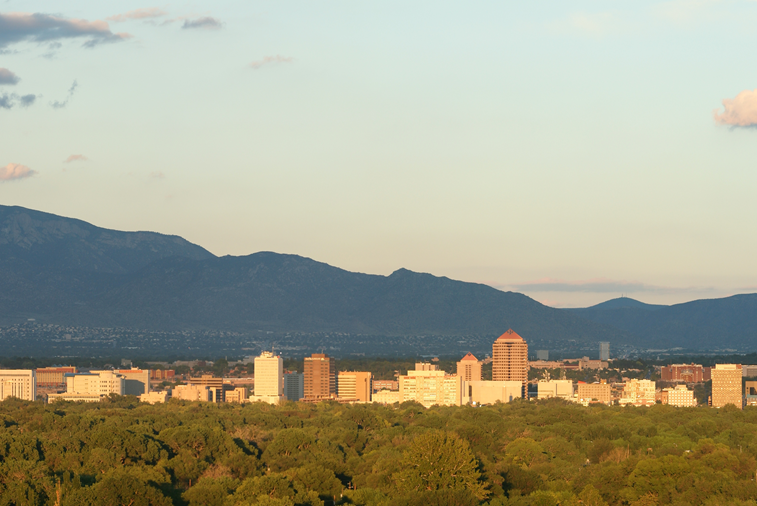
Albuquerque skyline with the Sandia Mountains in the distance

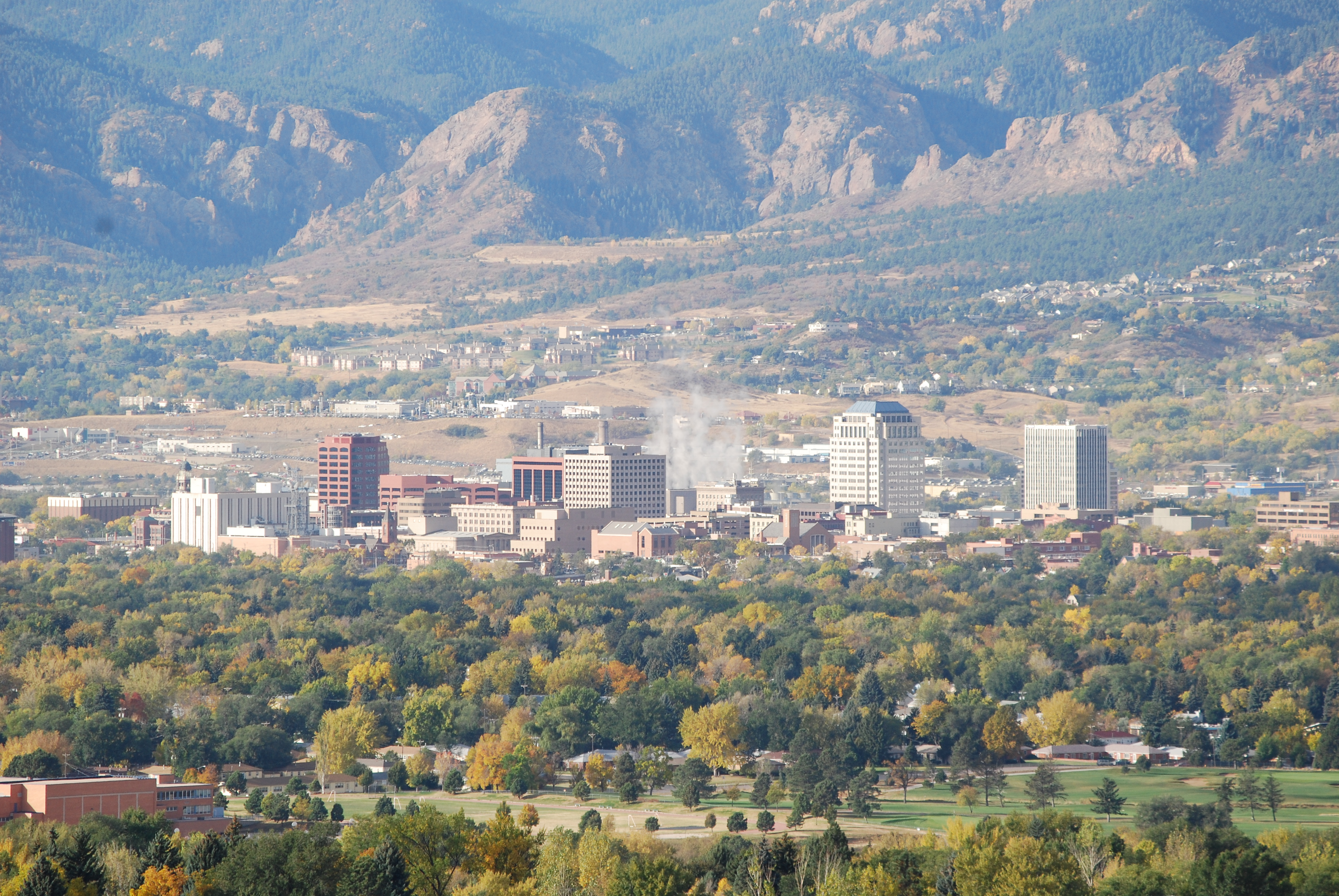
The skyline of Colorado Springs with the Front Range in the background

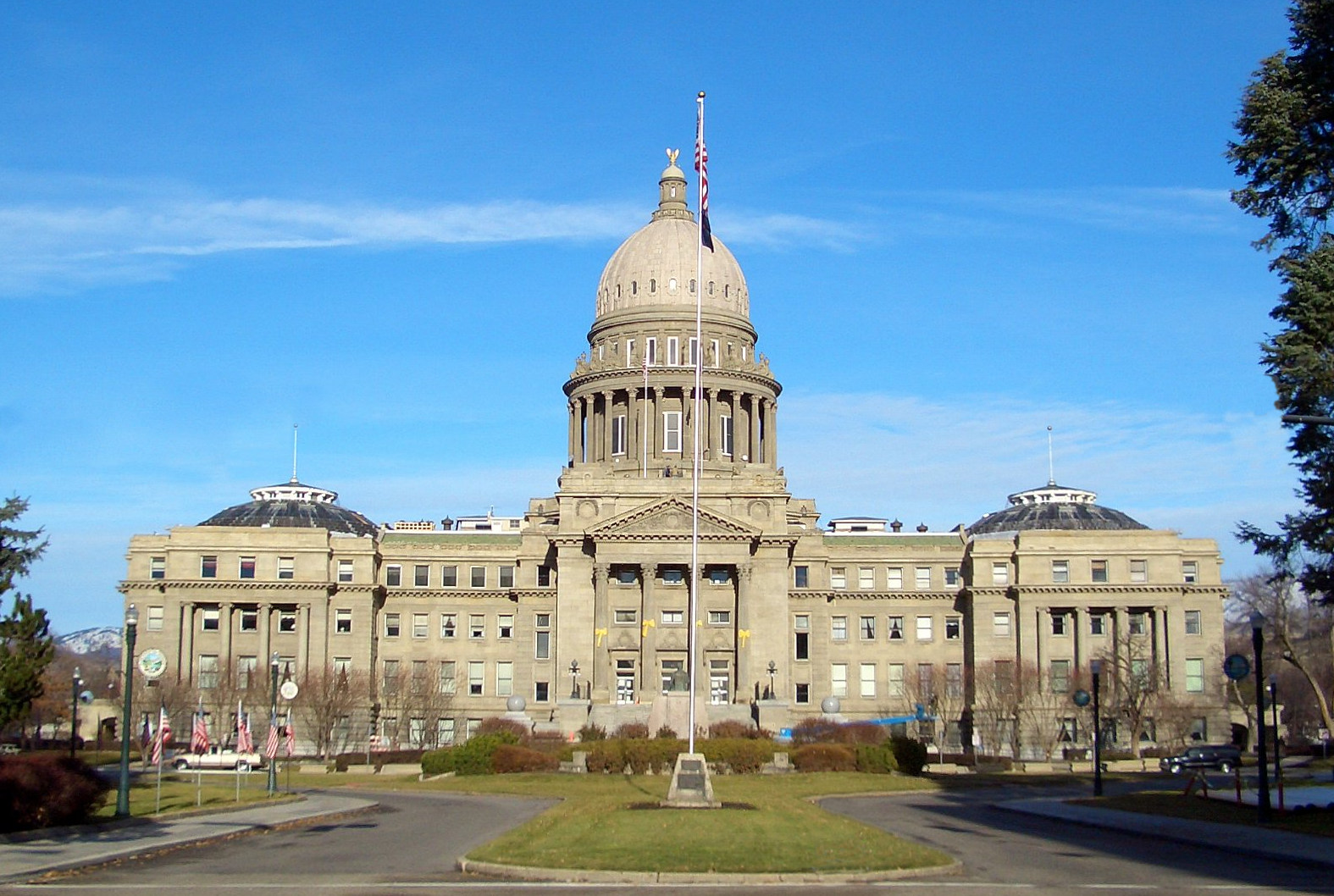
The Idaho State Capitol in Boise

The 30 most populous Core Based Statistical Areas of the Mountain states
Rank	CBSA	2020 pop	2010 pop	Change
1	Phoenix–Mesa–Scottsdale, AZ MSA	4,845,832	4,192,887	+15.57%
2	Denver-Aurora-Centennial, CO MSA	2,963,821	2,543,482	+16.53%
3	Las Vegas, NV MSA	2,265,461	1,951,269	+16.10%
4	Salt Lake City, UT MSA	1,257,936	1,124,197	+11.90%
5	Tucson, AZ MSA	1,043,433	980,263	+6.44%
6	Albuquerque, NM MSA	916,528	887,077	+3.32%
7	Boise City, ID MSA	764,718	616,561	+24.03%
8	Colorado Springs, CO MSA	755,105	645,613	+16.96%
9	Ogden-Clearfield, UT MSA	694,863	597,159	+16.36%
10	Provo-Orem, UT MSA	671,185	526,810	+27.41%
11	Reno, NV MSA	490,596	425,417	+15.32%
12	Fort Collins, CO MSA	359,066	299,630	+19.84%
13	Boulder, CO MSA	330,758	294,567	+12.29%
14	Greeley, CO MSA	328,981	252,825	+30.12%
15	Prescott, AZ MSA	236,209	211,033	+11.93%
16	Las Cruces, NM MSA	219,561	209,233	+4.94%
17	Lake Havasu City-Kingman, AZ MSA	213,267	200,186	+6.53%
18	Yuma, AZ MSA	203,881	195,751	+4.15%
19	Billings, MT MSA	184,167	158,050	+16.52%
20	Saint George, UT MSA	180,279	138,115	+30.53%
21	Coeur d'Alene, ID MSA	171,362	138,494	+23.73%
22	Pueblo, CO MSA	168,162	159,063	+5.72%
23	Idaho Falls, ID MSA	157,429	130,374	+20.75%
24	Grand Junction, CO MSA	155,703	146,723	+6.12%
25	Santa Fe, NM MSA	154,823	144,170	+7.39%
26	Logan, UT-ID MSA	147,348	125,442	+17.46%
27	Flagstaff, AZ MSA	145,101	134,421	+7.95%
28	Sierra Vista-Douglas, AZ MSA	125,447	131,346	−4.49%
29	Farmington, NM MSA	121,661	130,044	−6.45%
30	Missoula, MT MSA	117,922	109,299	+7.89%

The twelve combined statistical areas of the Mountain states
Rank	CSA	2014 pop	2010 pop	Change	Component CBSAs
1	Denver-Aurora-Greeley, CO CSA	3,345,261	3,090,874	+8.23%	Boulder, CO MSA; Denver-Aurora-Centennial, CO MSA; Greeley, CO MSA
2	Salt Lake City-Provo-Orem, UT CSA	2,423,912	2,271,696	+6.70%	Heber, UT μSA; Ogden-Clearfield, UT MSA; Provo-Orem, UT MSA; Salt Lake City, UT MSA
3	Las Vegas, NV CSA	2,315,324	2,195,401	+5.46%	Lake Havasu City-Kingman, AZ MSA; Las Vegas-Henderson-Paradise, NV MSA; Pahrump, NV μSA
4	Albuquerque-Santa Fe-Las Vegas, NM Combined Statistical Area	1,165,798	1,146,049	+1.72%	Albuquerque MSA; Espanola, NM μSA; Grants, NM μSA; Las Vegas, NM μSA; Los Alamos, NM μSA; Santa Fe, NM MSA
5	Tucson-Nogales, AZ CSA	1,051,211	1,027,683	+2.29%	Nogales, AZ μSA; Tucson, AZ MSA
6	Boise City-Mountain Home-Ontario, ID-OR CSA	743,711	697,535	+6.62%	Boise City, ID MSA; Mountain Home, ID μSA; Ontario, OR-ID μSA
7	Reno-Carson City-Fernley, NV CSA	597,837	579,668	+3.13%	Carson City, NV MSA; Fernley, NV μSA; Gardnerville Ranchos, NV μSA; Reno-Sparks, NV MSA
8	Idaho Falls-Rexburg-Blackfoot, ID CSA	234,440	229,650	+2.09%	Idaho Falls, ID MSA; Blackfoot, ID μSA; Rexburg, ID μSA
9	Pueblo-Cañon City, CO CSA	208,377	205,887	+1.21%	Cañon City, CO μSA; Pueblo, CO MSA
10	Edwards-Glenwood Springs, CO CSA	128,008	125,734	+1.81%	Edwards, CO μSA; Glenwood Springs, CO μSA
11	Clovis-Portales, NM CSA	70,505	68,222	+3.35%	Clovis, NM μSA; Portales, NM μSA
12	Steamboat Springs-Craig, CO Combined Statistical Area	36,793	37,304	−1.37%	Craig, CO μSA; Steamboat Springs, CO μSA

== Gallery ==
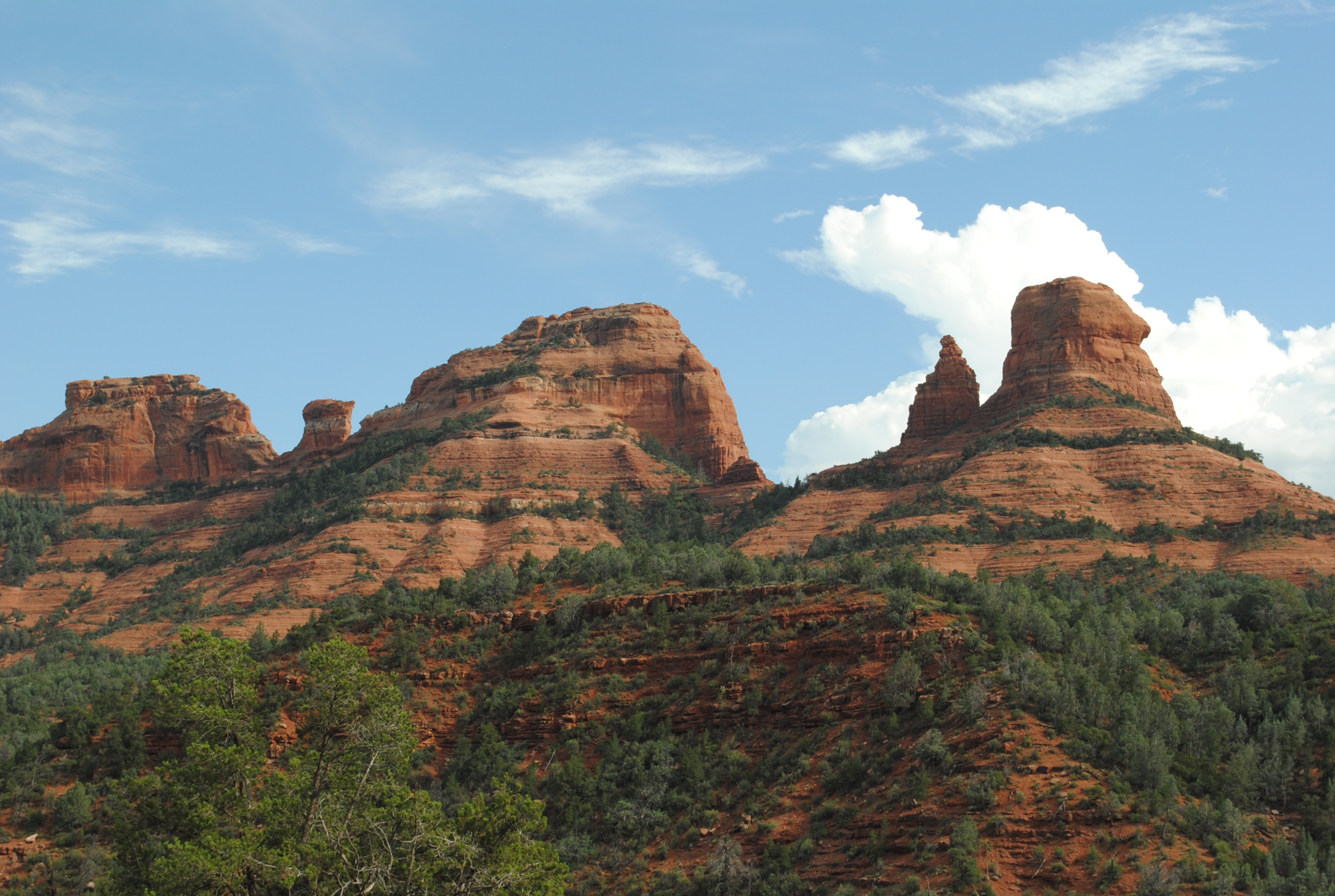
Bell Rock near Sedona, Arizona

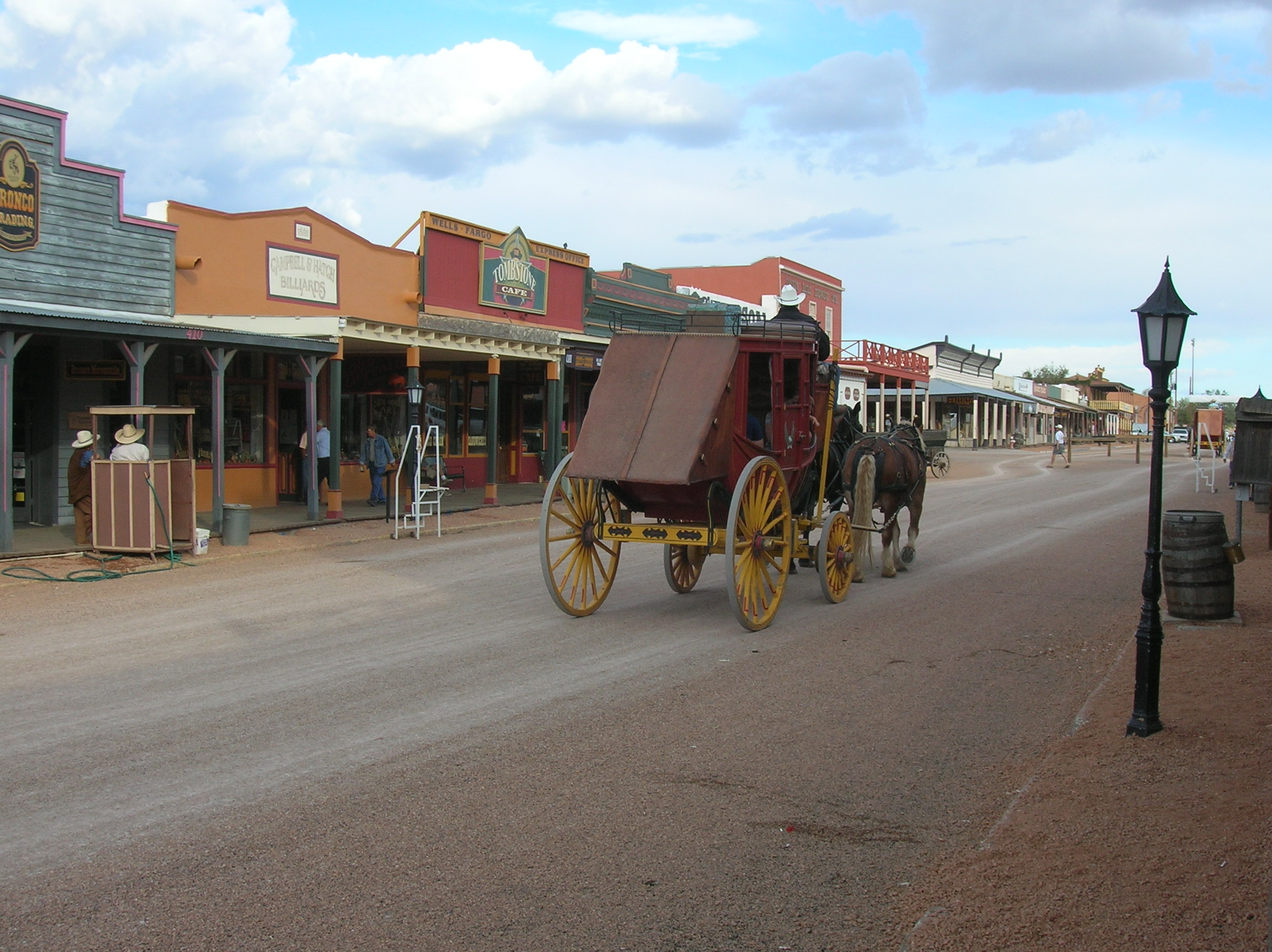
Tombstone, Arizona

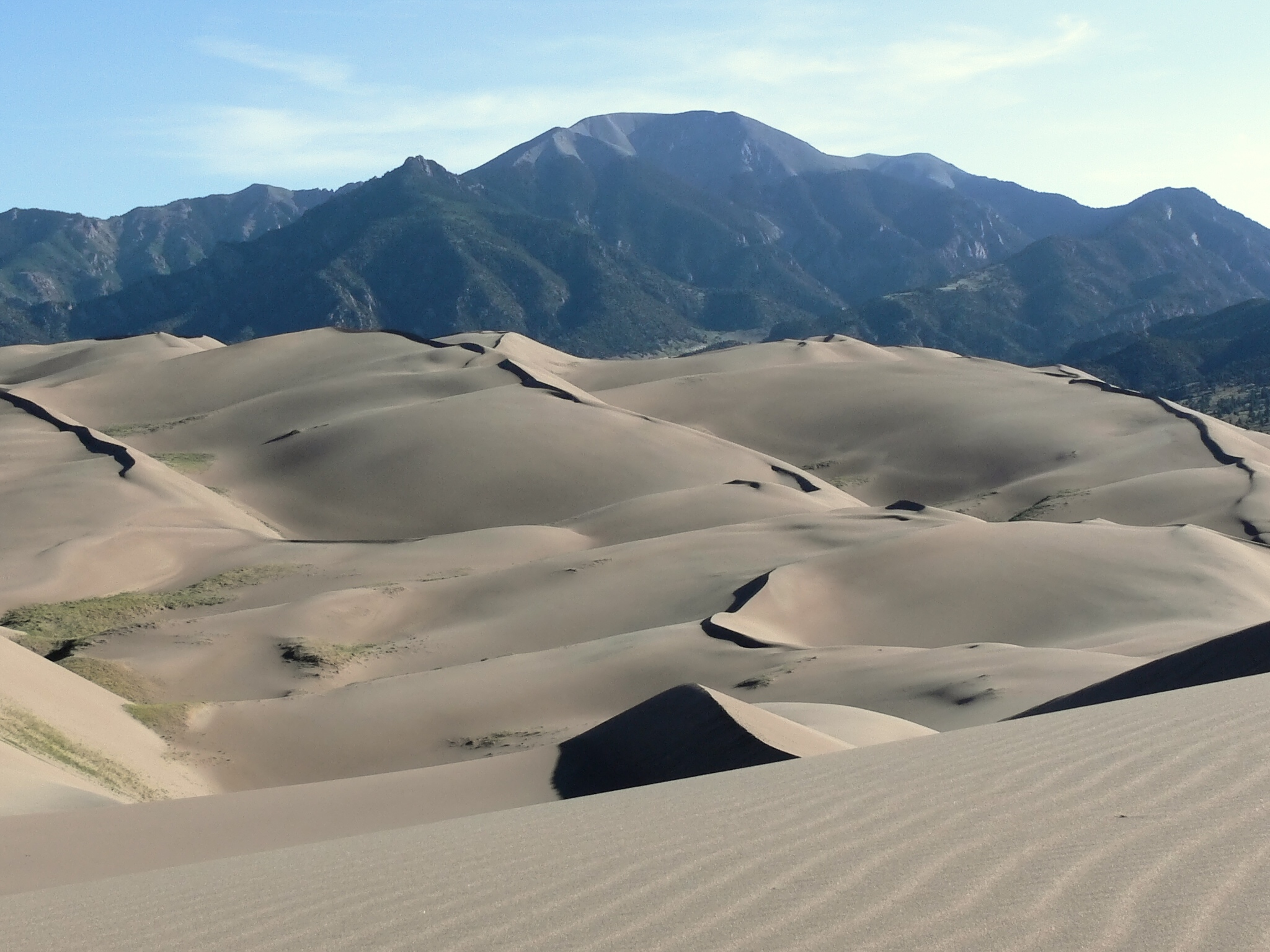
Great Sand Dunes National Park in Colorado

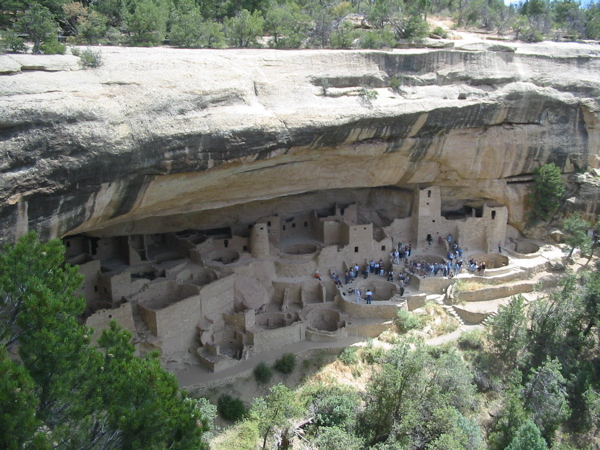
The Cliff Palace in Mesa Verde National Park in Colorado

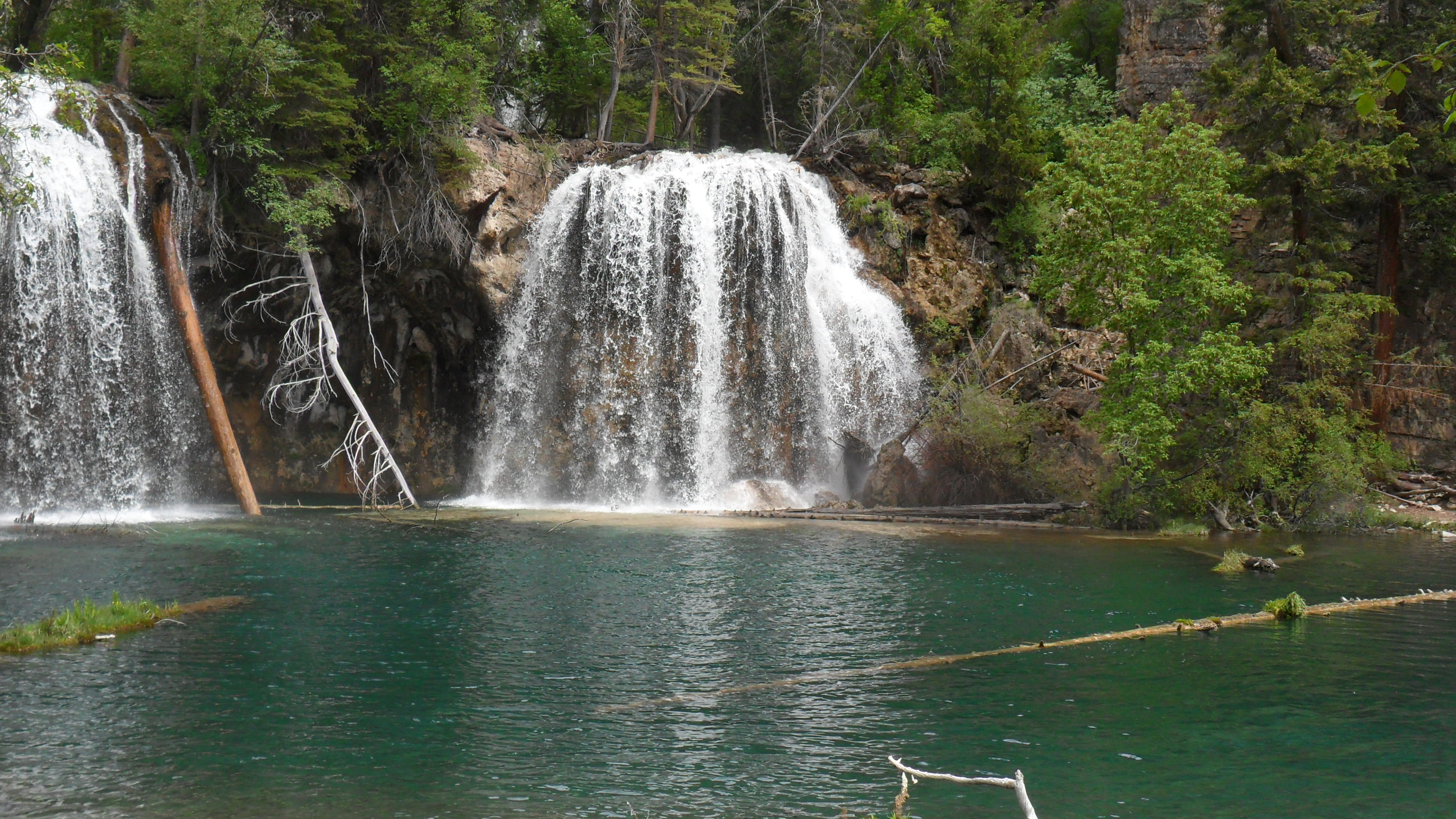
Hanging Lake near Glenwood Springs, Colorado

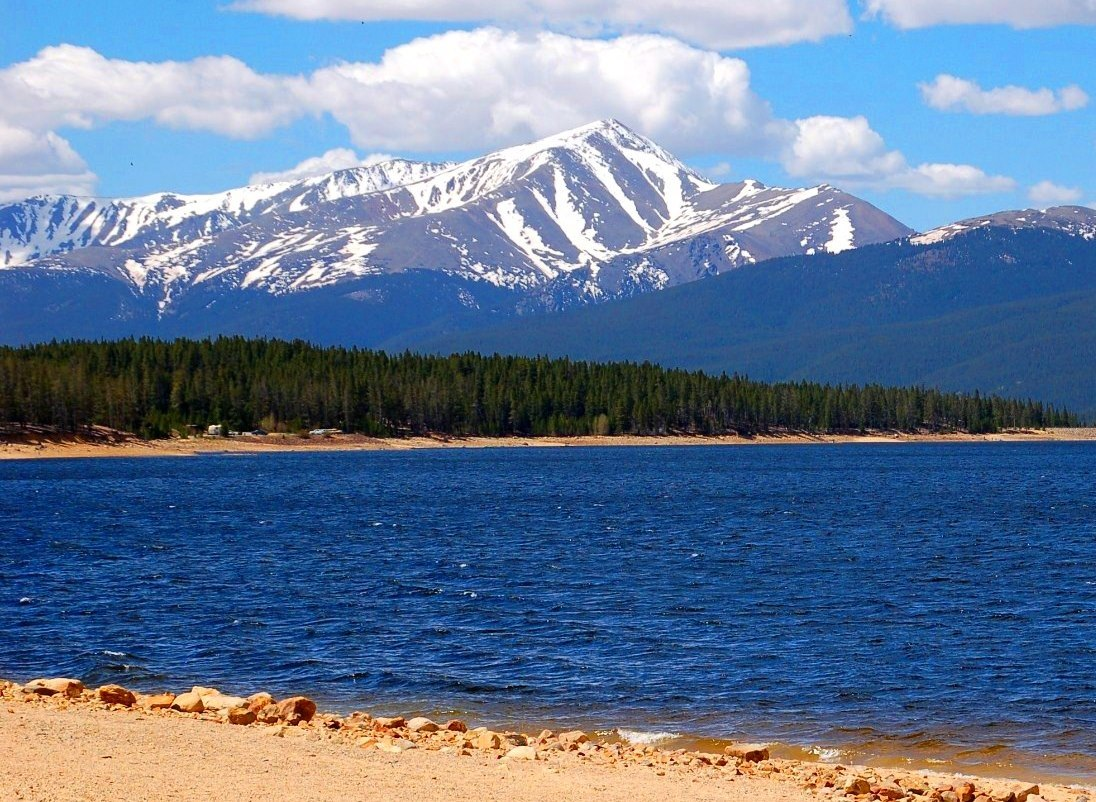
Mount Elbert in Colorado is the highest summit in the Mountain states.

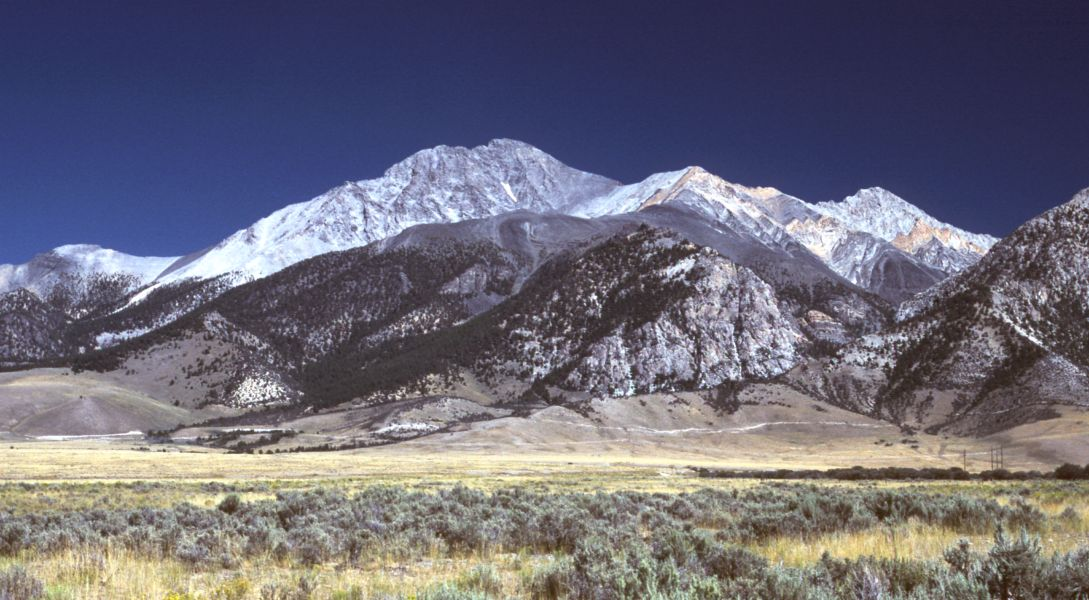
Borah Peak is the highest point in the state of Idaho.

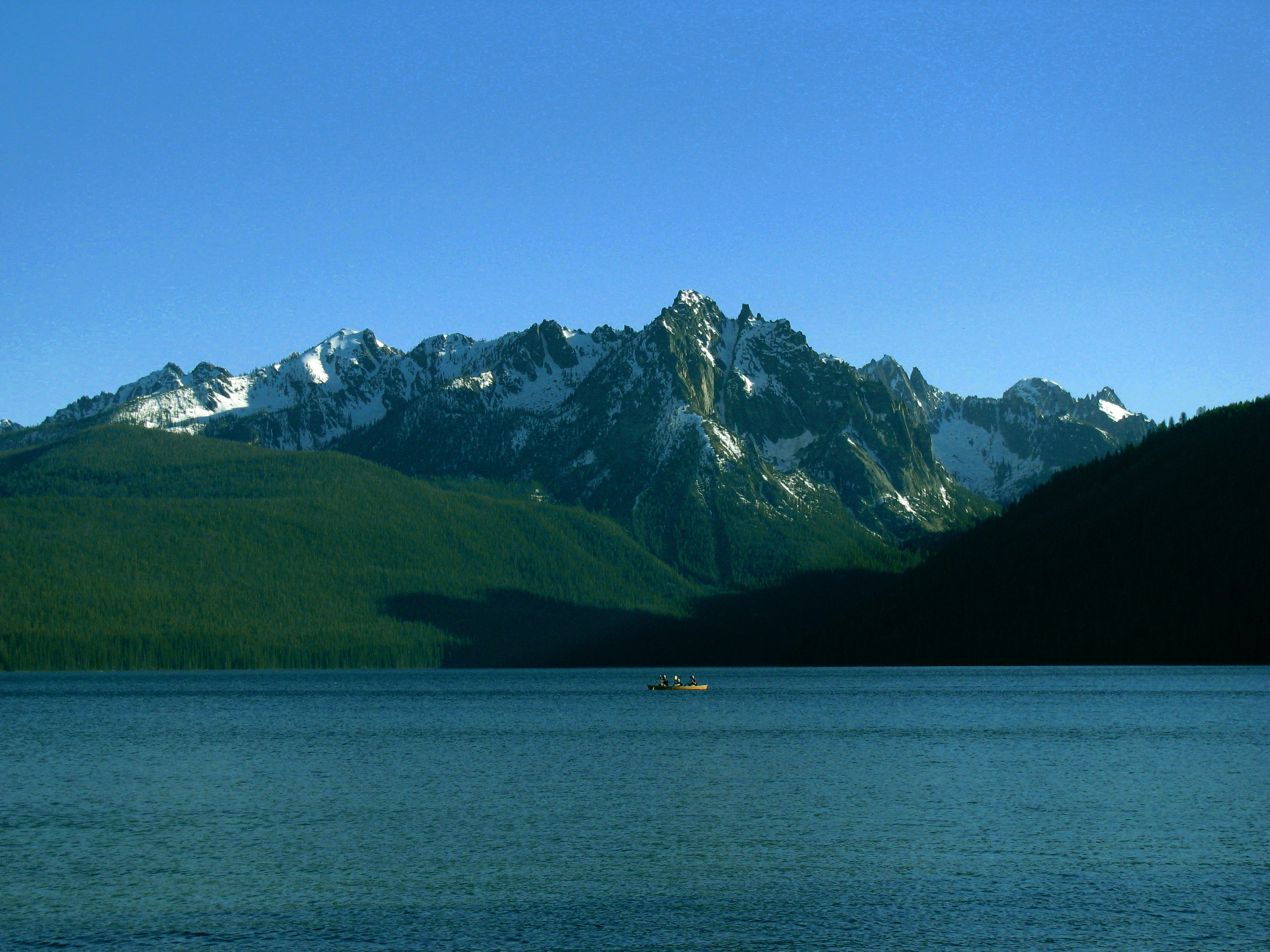
Redfish Lake in Idaho

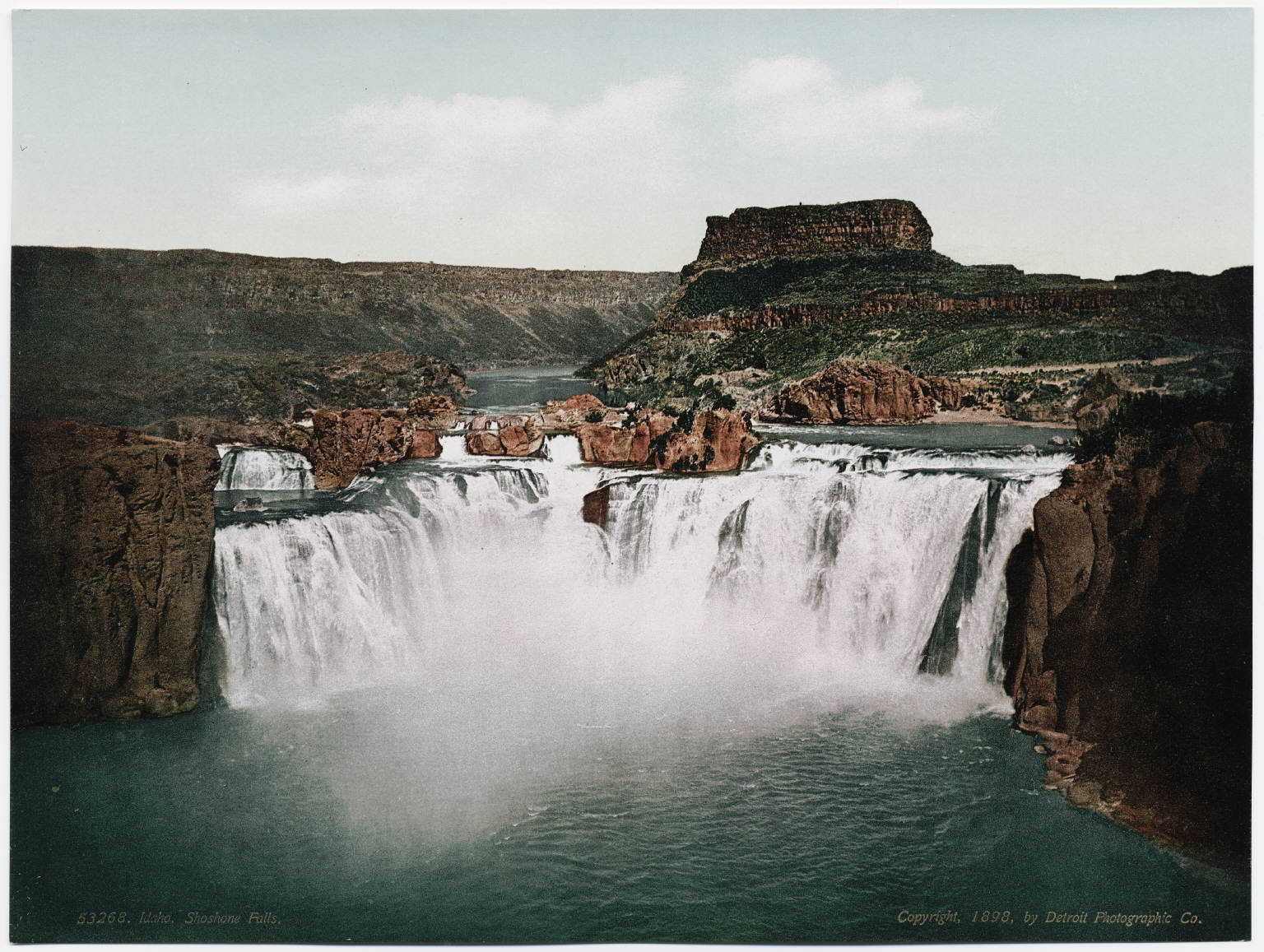
Shoshone Falls on the Snake River in Idaho, 1898

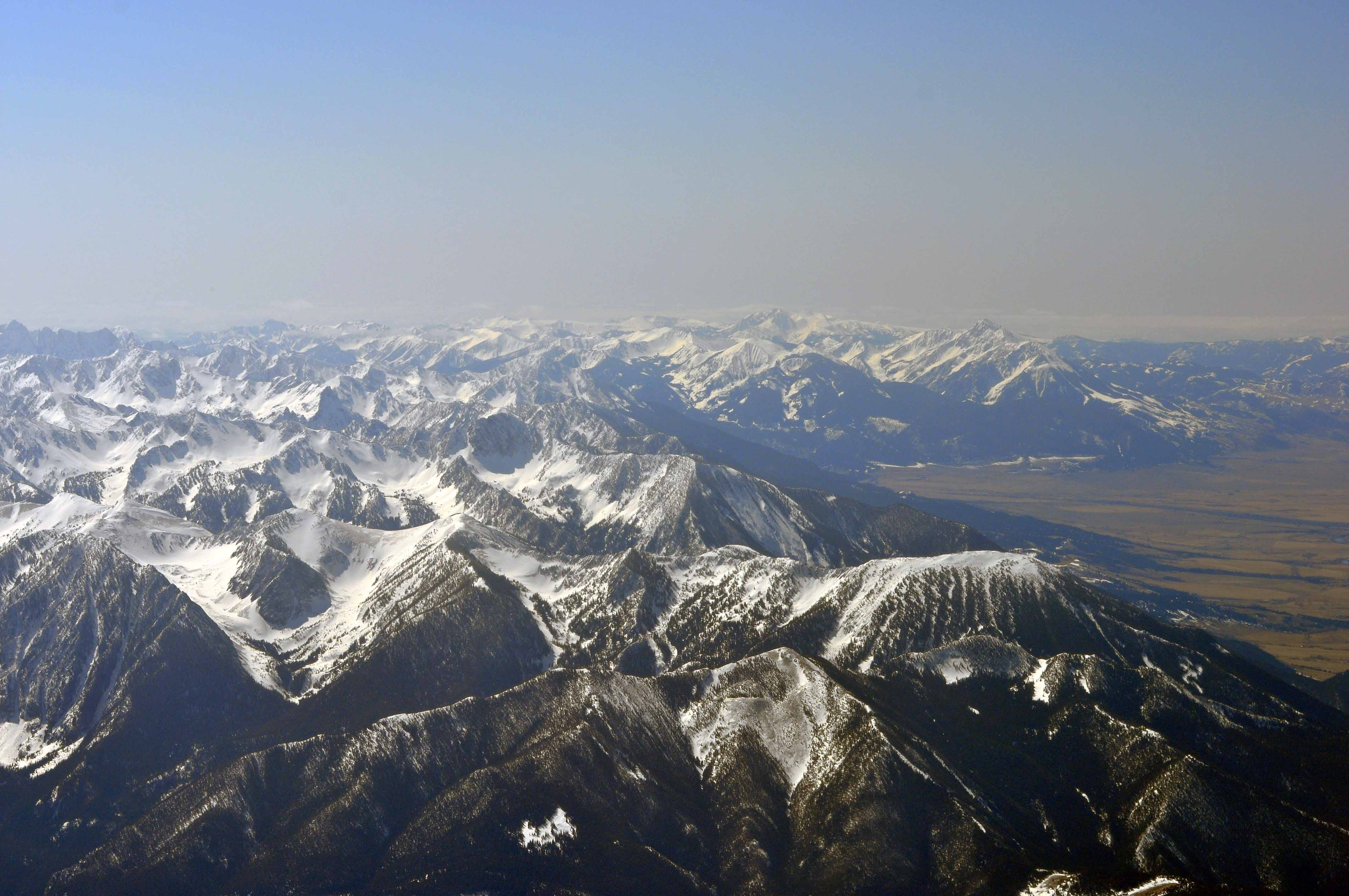
The Absaroka Range of Montana.

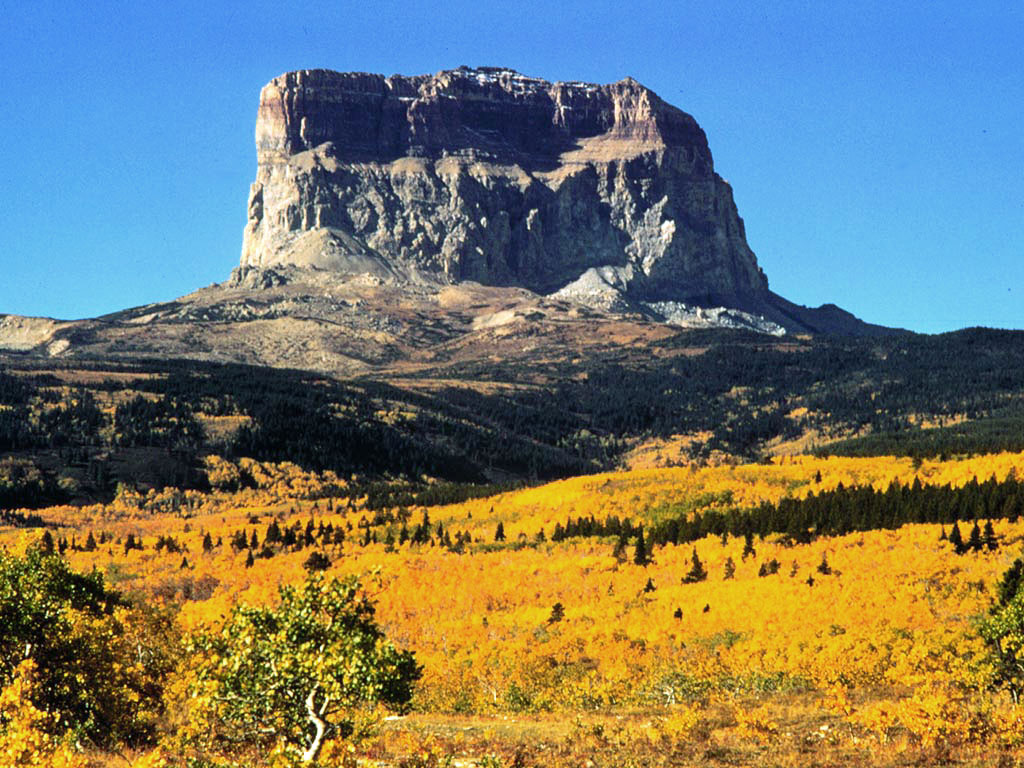
Autumn comes to Chief Mountain in Glacier National Park in Montana.

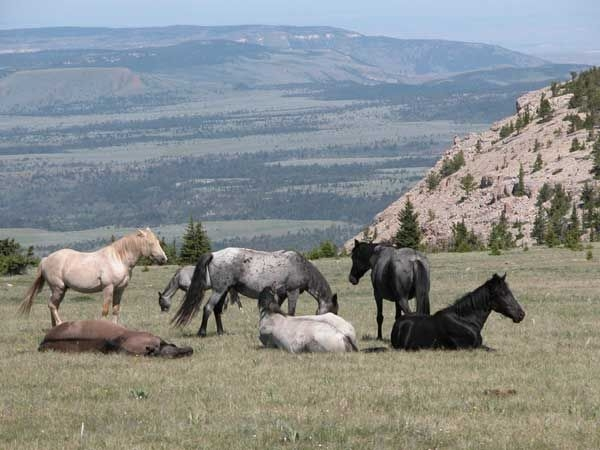
Feral horses in the Pryor Mountain Wild Horse Range in Montana

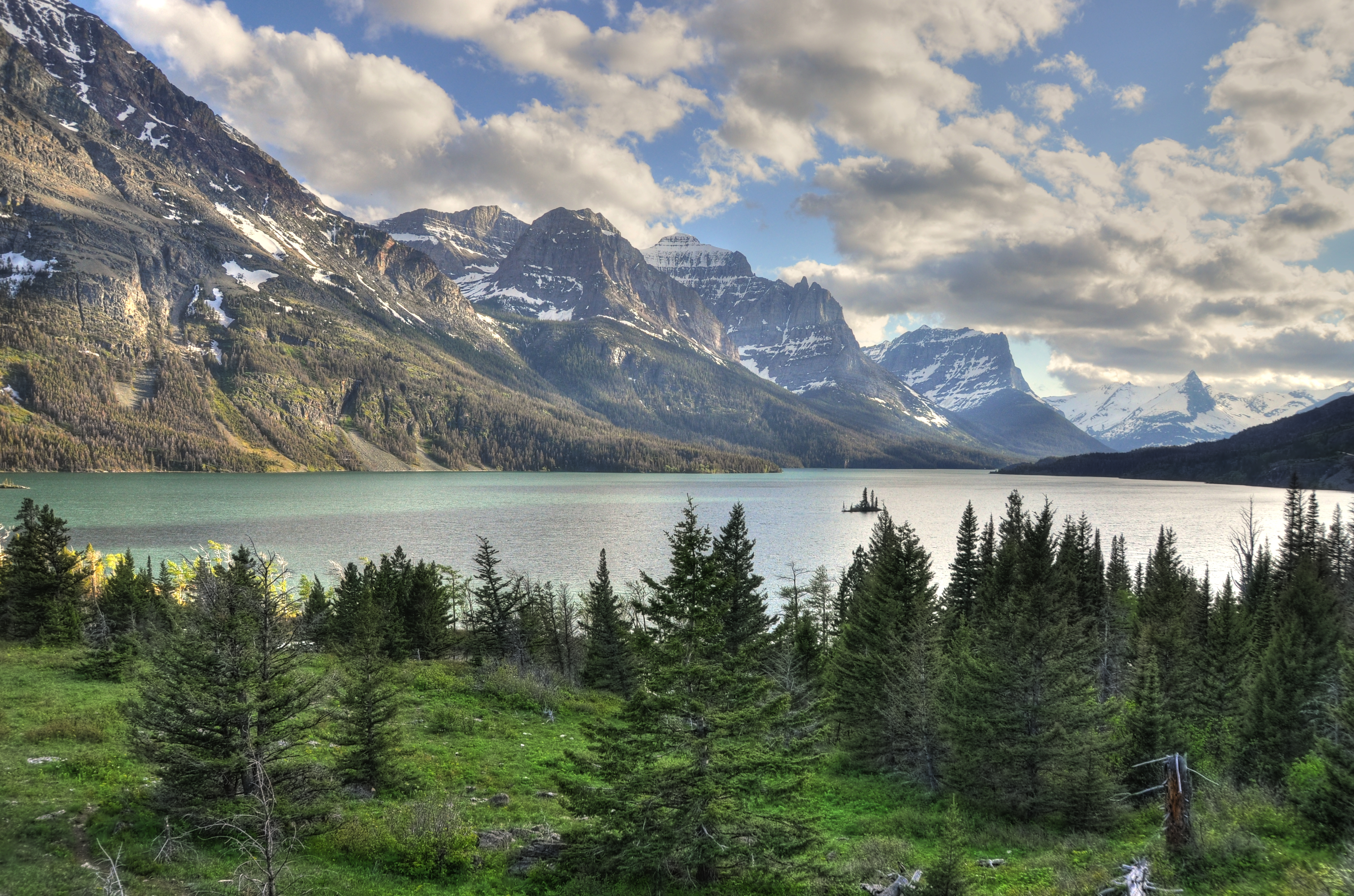
Saint Mary Lake in Glacier National Park in Montana

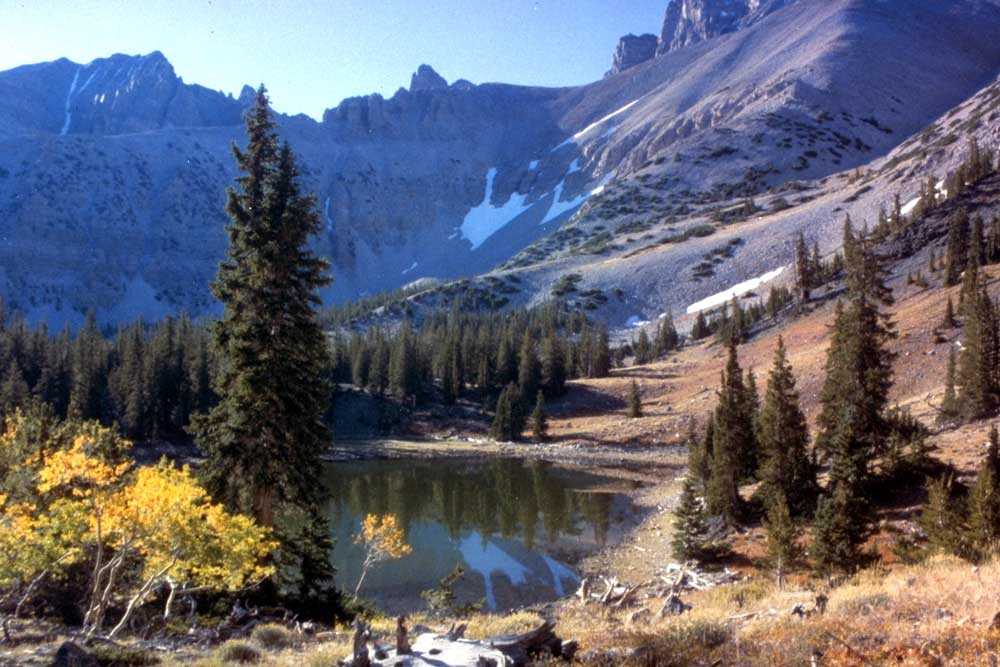
Stella Lake in Great Basin National Park in Nevada

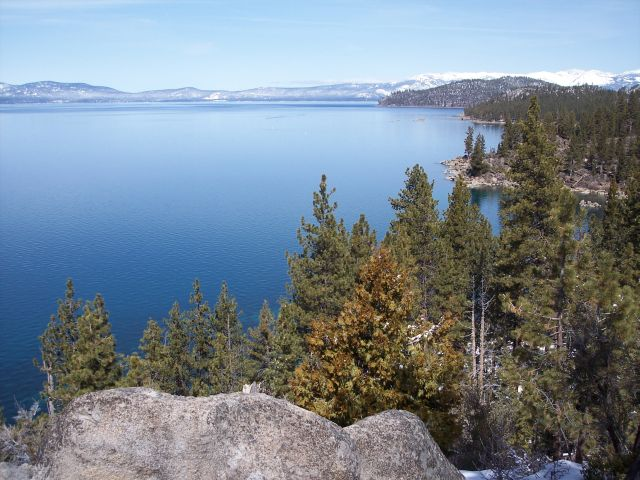
The Nevada shore of Lake Tahoe

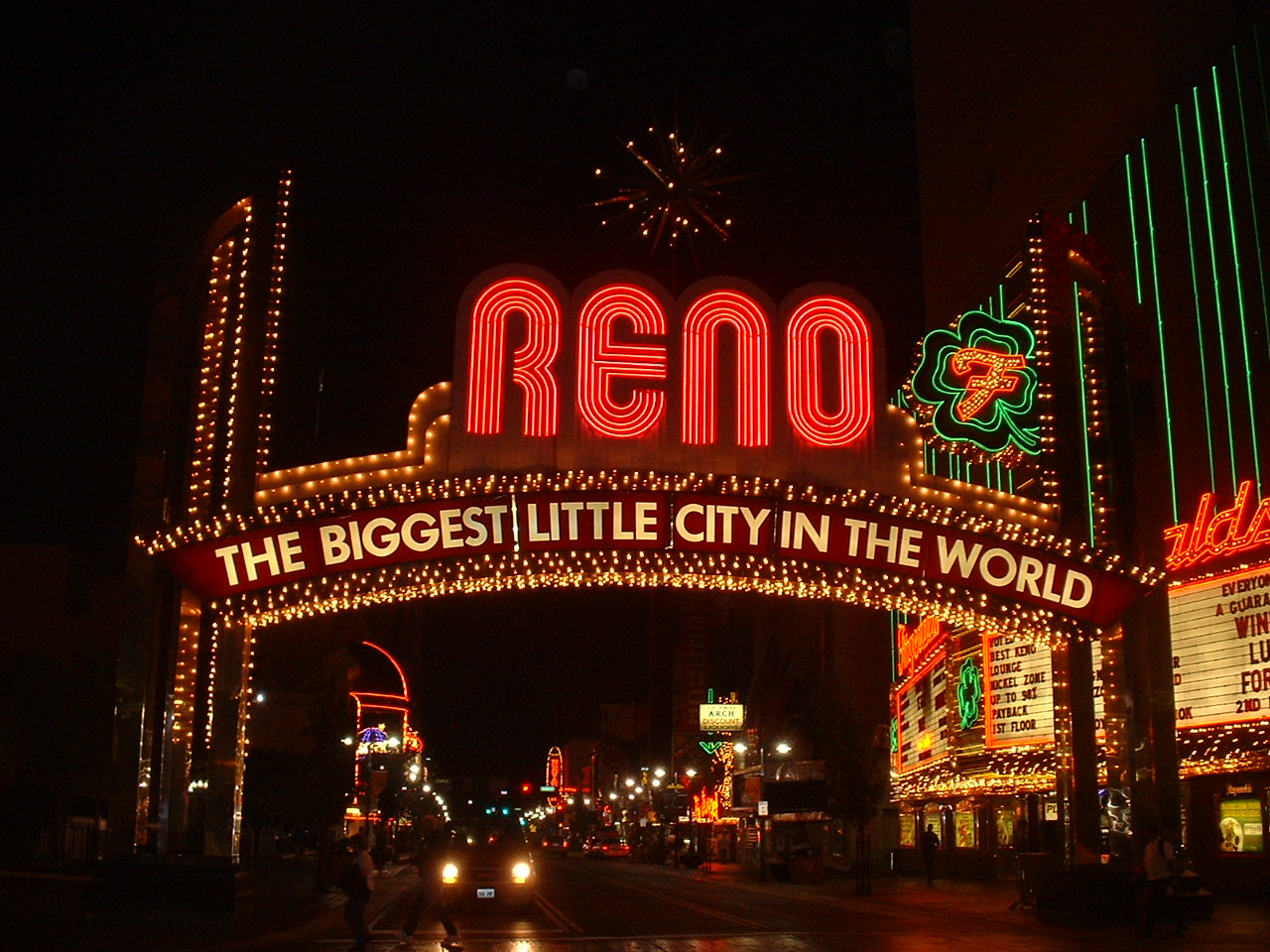
Downtown Reno, Nevada

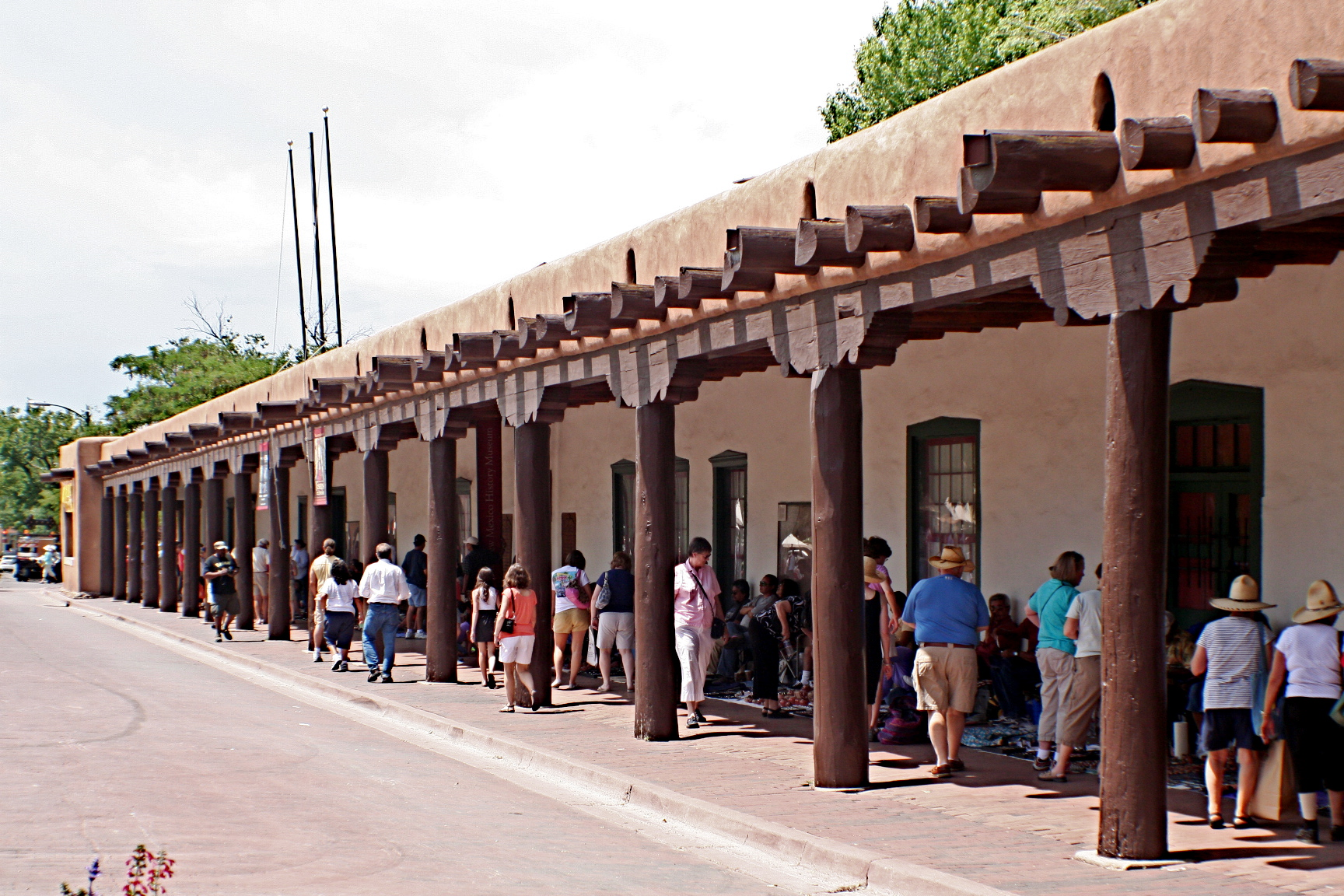
Palace of the Governors in Santa Fe, New Mexico

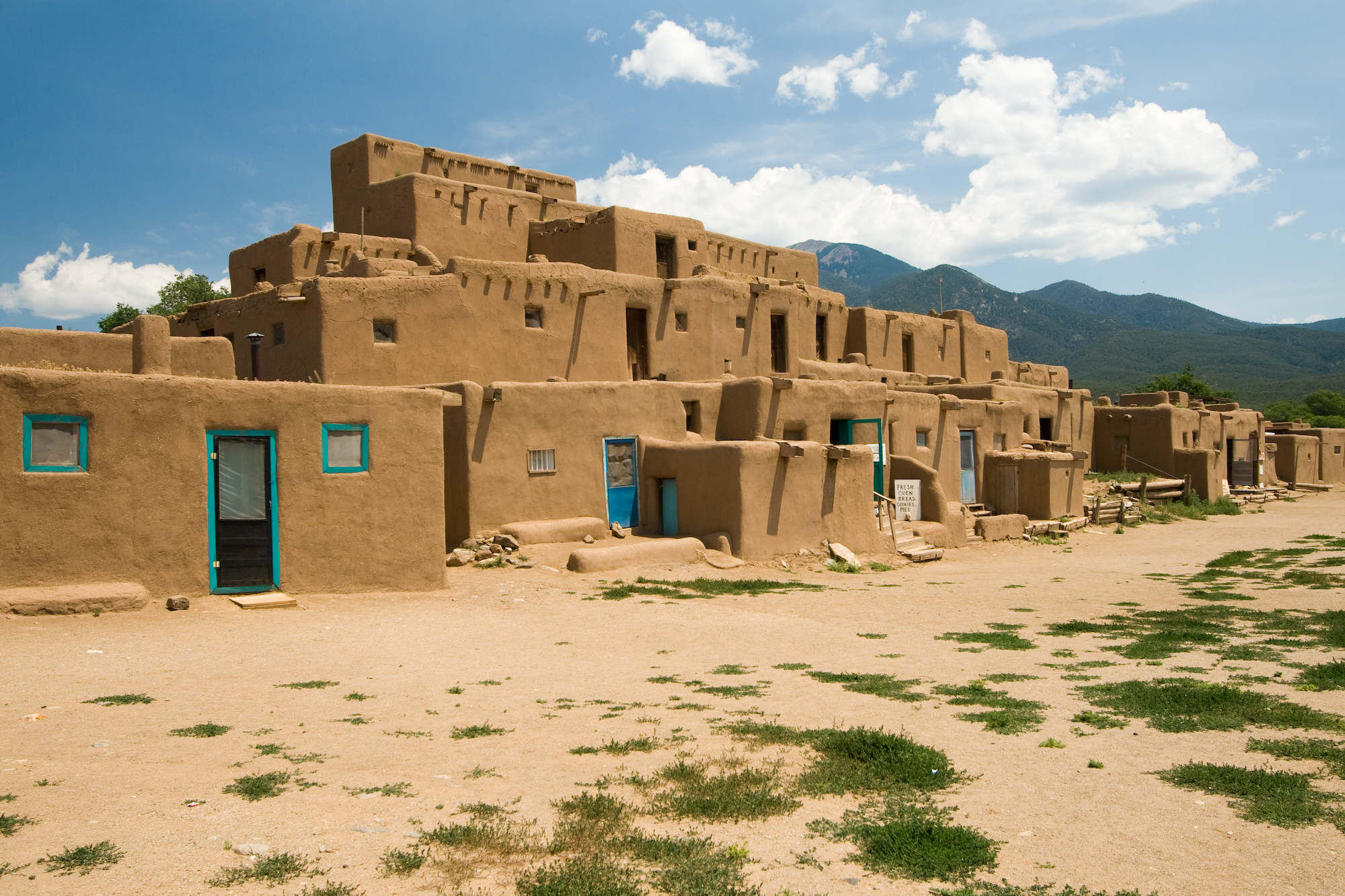
The Taos Pueblo of New Mexico

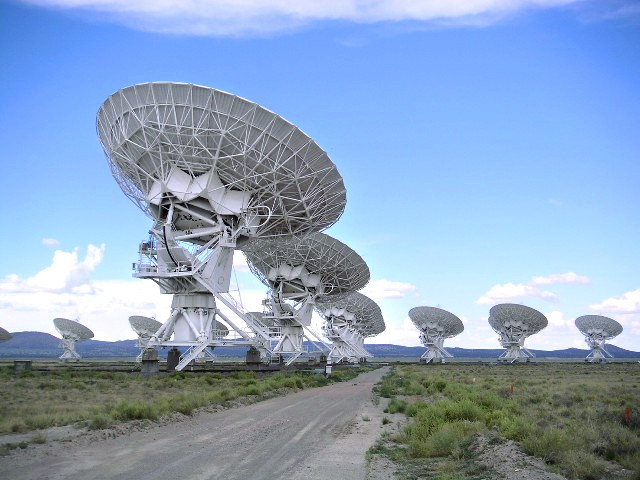
The Very Large Array near Socorro, New Mexico

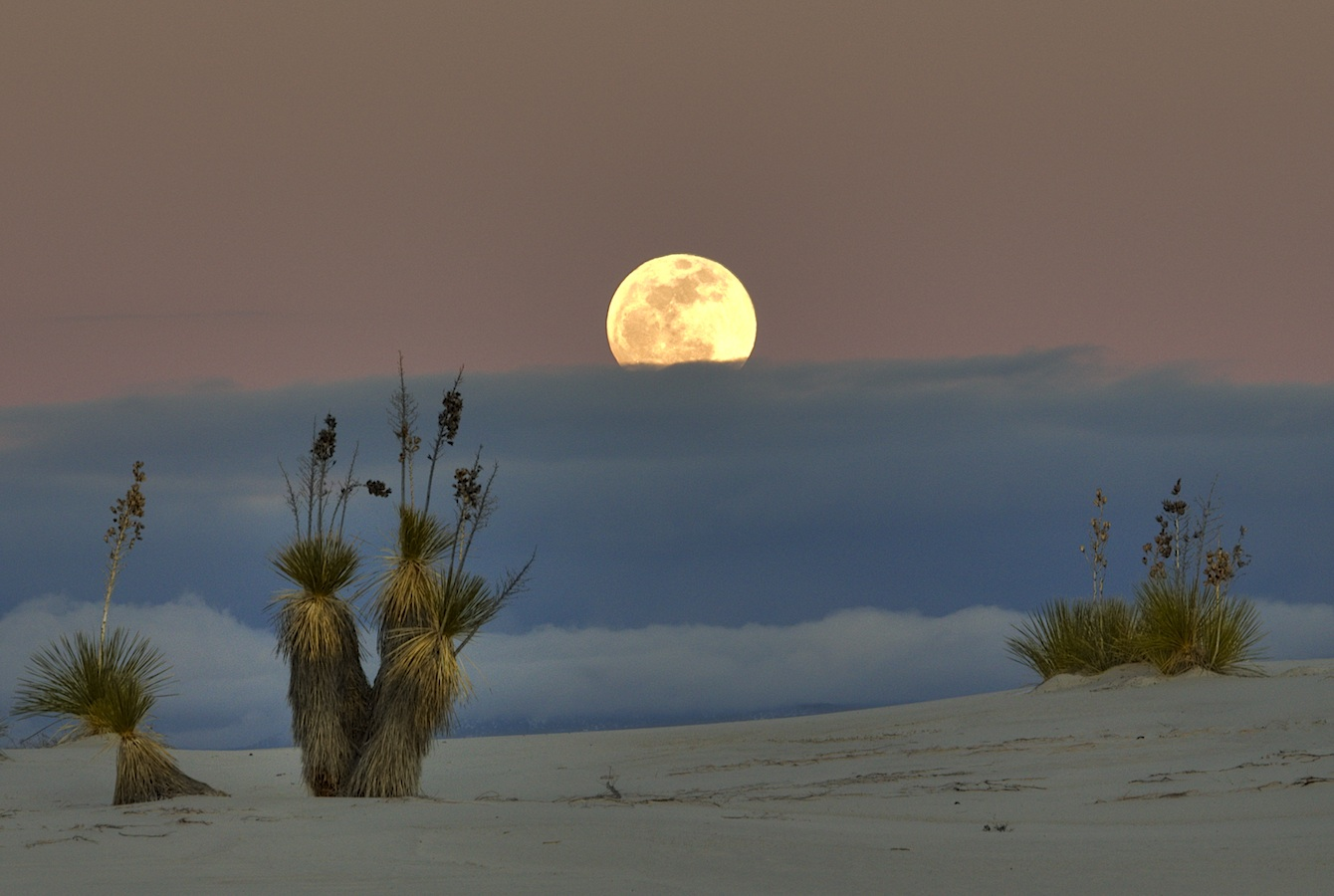
Moonrise at White Sands National Park in New Mexico

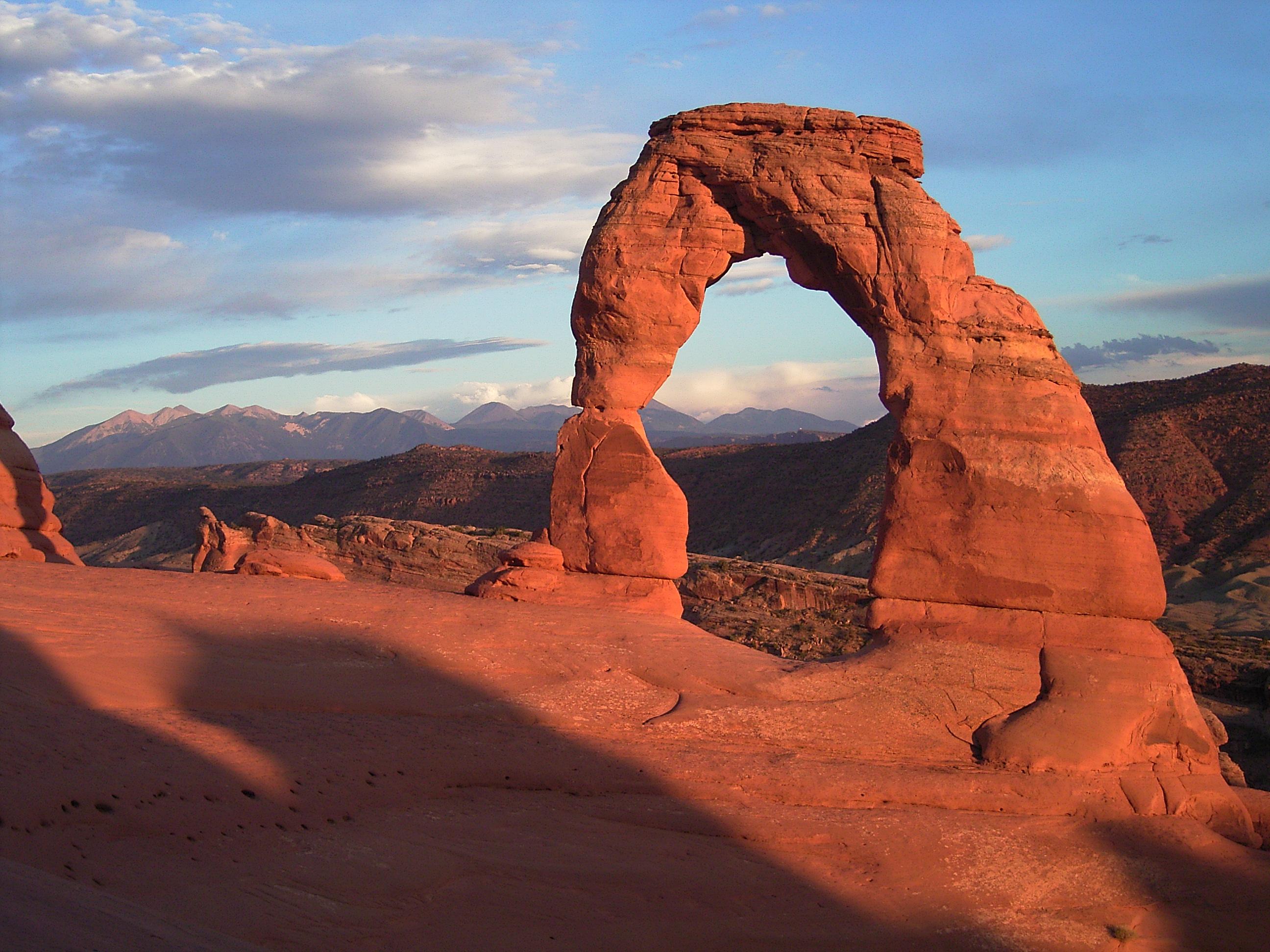
Sunset at Delicate Arch in Arches National Park in Utah

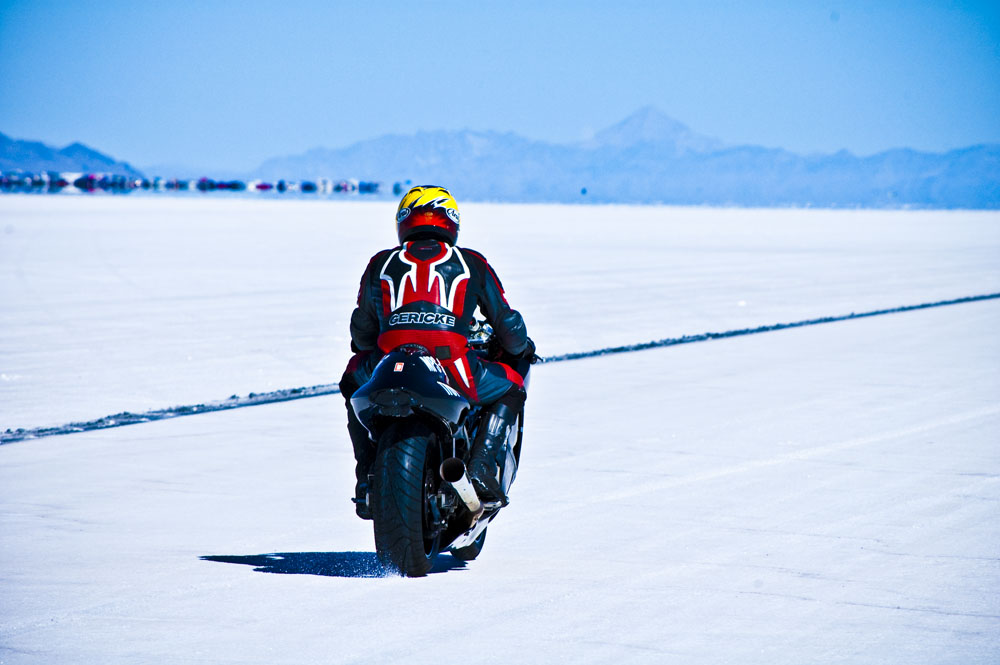
The Bonneville Salt Flats in Utah

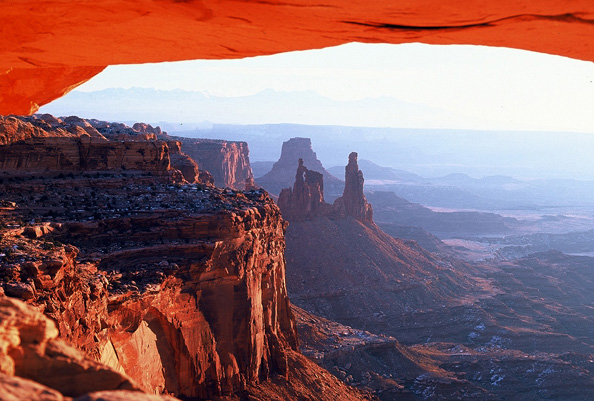
Mesa Arch in Canyonlands National Park in Utah

== Politics ==
Parties
Democratic	Republican	Populist

- **Bold** denotes election winner.

Presidential electoral votes in the Mountain states since 1864
Year	Arizona	Colorado	Idaho	Montana	Nevada	New Mexico	Utah	Wyoming
1864	No election	No election	No election	No election	**Lincoln**	No election	No election	No election
1868	No election	No election	No election	No election	**Grant**	No election	No election	No election
1872	No election	No election	No election	No election	**Grant**	No election	No election	No election
1876	No election	**Hayes**	No election	No election	**Hayes**	No election	No election	No election
1880	No election	**Garfield**	No election	No election	Hancock	No election	No election	No election
1884	No election	Blaine	No election	No election	Blaine	No election	No election	No election
1888	No election	**Harrison**	No election	No election	**Harrison**	No election	No election	No election
1892	No election	Weaver	Weaver	Harrison	Weaver	No election	No election	Harrison
1896	No election	Bryan	Bryan	Bryan	Bryan	No election	Bryan	Bryan
1900	No election	Bryan	Bryan	Bryan	Bryan	No election	**McKinley**	**McKinley**
1904	No election	**Roosevelt**	**Roosevelt**	**Roosevelt**	**Roosevelt**	No election	**Roosevelt**	**Roosevelt**
1908	No election	Bryan	**Taft**	**Taft**	Bryan	No election	**Taft**	**Taft**
1912	**Wilson**	**Wilson**	**Wilson**	**Wilson**	**Wilson**	**Wilson**	Taft	**Wilson**
1916	**Wilson**	**Wilson**	**Wilson**	**Wilson**	**Wilson**	**Wilson**	**Wilson**	**Wilson**
1920	**Harding**	**Harding**	**Harding**	**Harding**	**Harding**	**Harding**	**Harding**	**Harding**
1924	**Coolidge**	**Coolidge**	**Coolidge**	**Coolidge**	**Coolidge**	**Coolidge**	**Coolidge**	**Coolidge**
1928	**Hoover**	**Hoover**	**Hoover**	**Hoover**	**Hoover**	**Hoover**	**Hoover**	**Hoover**
1932	**Roosevelt**	**Roosevelt**	**Roosevelt**	**Roosevelt**	**Roosevelt**	**Roosevelt**	**Roosevelt**	**Roosevelt**
1936	**Roosevelt**	**Roosevelt**	**Roosevelt**	**Roosevelt**	**Roosevelt**	**Roosevelt**	**Roosevelt**	**Roosevelt**
1940	**Roosevelt**	Willkie	**Roosevelt**	**Roosevelt**	**Roosevelt**	**Roosevelt**	**Roosevelt**	**Roosevelt**
1944	**Roosevelt**	Dewey	**Roosevelt**	**Roosevelt**	**Roosevelt**	**Roosevelt**	**Roosevelt**	Dewey
1948	**Truman**	**Truman**	**Truman**	**Truman**	**Truman**	**Truman**	**Truman**	**Truman**
1952	**Eisenhower**	**Eisenhower**	**Eisenhower**	**Eisenhower**	**Eisenhower**	**Eisenhower**	**Eisenhower**	**Eisenhower**
1956	**Εisenhower**	**Eisenhower**	**Eisenhower**	**Eisenhower**	**Eisenhower**	**Eisenhower**	**Eisenhower**	**Eisenhower**
1960	Nixon	Nixon	Nixon	Nixon	**Kennedy**	**Kennedy**	Nixon	Nixon
1964	Goldwater	**Johnson**	**Johnson**	**Johnson**	**Johnson**	**Johnson**	**Johnson**	**Johnson**
1968	**Nixon**	**Nixon**	**Nixon**	**Nixon**	**Nixon**	**Nixon**	**Nixon**	**Nixon**
1972	**Nixon**	**Nixon**	**Nixon**	**Nixon**	**Nixon**	**Nixon**	**Nixon**	**Nixon**
1976	Ford	Ford	Ford	Ford	Ford	Ford	Ford	Ford
1980	**Reagan**	**Reagan**	**Reagan**	**Reagan**	**Reagan**	**Reagan**	**Reagan**	**Reagan**
1984	**Reagan**	**Reagan**	**Reagan**	**Reagan**	**Reagan**	**Reagan**	**Reagan**	**Reagan**
1988	**Bush**	**Bush**	**Bush**	**Bush**	**Bush**	**Bush**	**Bush**	**Bush**
1992	Bush	**Clinton**	Bush	**Clinton**	**Clinton**	**Clinton**	Bush	Bush
1996	**Clinton**	Dole	Dole	Dole	**Clinton**	**Clinton**	Dole	Dole
2000	**Bush**	**Bush**	**Bush**	**Bush**	**Bush**	Gore	**Bush**	**Bush**
2004	**Bush**	**Bush**	**Bush**	**Bush**	**Bush**	**Bush**	**Bush**	**Bush**
2008	McCain	**Obama**	McCain	McCain	**Obama**	**Obama**	McCain	McCain
2012	Romney	**Obama**	Romney	Romney	**Obama**	**Obama**	Romney	Romney
2016	**Trump**	Clinton	**Trump**	**Trump**	Clinton	Clinton	**Trump**	**Trump**
2020	**Biden**	**Biden**	Trump	Trump	**Biden**	**Biden**	Trump	Trump
2024	**Trump**	Harris	**Trump**	**Trump**	**Trump**	Harris	**Trump**	**Trump**
Year	Arizona	Colorado	Idaho	Montana	Nevada	New Mexico	Utah	Wyoming

== Time zones ==
Mountain Time is observed in nearly the entire division, except Nevada (all but the stateline city of West Wendover) and the Idaho Panhandle. With the exception of West Wendover and Jackpot, Nevada, the entire state of Nevada, along with the Idaho Panhandle, observes Pacific Time. Daylight saving time is not observed in Arizona, except for lands within the Navajo Nation (northeast corner of the state) which observe daylight saving time due to the Nation traversing state lines. For this reason, most of Arizona is one hour behind the rest of the Mountain Time Zone from the second Sunday in March until the first Sunday in November.

== See also ==
- Mountain Time Zone
- Rocky Mountains
  - List of mountain peaks of the Rocky Mountains
- United States
  - List of Combined Statistical Areas
  - List of core-based statistical areas
    - List of metropolitan statistical areas
    - List of micropolitan statistical areas
  - U.S. state
  - Western United States
    - Front Range Urban Corridor
    - Intermountain West
    - Northwestern United States
      - Pacific Northwest
    - Southwestern United States
      - Pacific Southwest
    - Wasatch Front
