= National Register of Historic Places listings in Chaffee County, Colorado =

Location of Chaffee County in Colorado

This is a list of the National Register of Historic Places listings in Chaffee County, Colorado.

This is intended to be a complete list of the properties and districts on the National Register of Historic Places in Chaffee County, Colorado, United States. The locations of National Register properties and districts for which the latitude and longitude coordinates are included below, may be seen in a map.

There are 48 properties and districts listed on the National Register in the county. Another property was once listed but has been removed.

This National Park Service list is complete through NPS recent listings posted August 28, 2026.

== Current listings ==
	Name on the Register	Image	Date listed	Location	City or town	Description
1	Alexander House	Alexander House	November 7, 2007 (#07001148)	846 F St. 38°31′47″N 105°59′52″W	Salida	
2	Alpine Tunnel Historic District	Alpine Tunnel Historic District	April 1, 1996 (#80004632)	Along the Denver, South Park and Pacific Railroad tracks from Quartz to Hancock; 38°37′46″N 106°24′02″W	Hancock and Quartz	
3	Behrman Ranch		March 27, 2012 (#12000143)	31715 U.S. Route 24 N. 38°52′48″N 106°09′40″W	Buena Vista	
4	Bode-Stewart House	Bode-Stewart House	April 29, 2008 (#08000344)	803 F St. 38°31′49″N 105°59′52″W	Salida	
5	J. M. Bonney House	J. M. Bonney House	December 19, 1994 (#94001469)	408 Princeton Ave. 38°50′39″N 106°08′13″W	Buena Vista	
6	Bridge over Arkansas River	Bridge over Arkansas River	February 4, 1985 (#85000190)	U.S. Route 24; 38°48′49″N 106°06′12″W	Buena Vista	
7	Brown's Canyon Bridge	Brown's Canyon Bridge	July 30, 2013 (#13000554)	County Road 191 crossing the Arkansas River; 38°36′46″N 106°03′43″W	Salida	
8	Buena Vista Ranger Station	Buena Vista Ranger Station	March 2, 2022 (#100007489)	410 East Main St. 38°50′35″N 106°07′44″W	Buena Vista	
9	Chaffee County Courthouse and Jail Buildings	Chaffee County Courthouse and Jail Buildings	September 10, 1979 (#79000575)	501 E. Main St. 38°50′37″N 106°07′37″W	Buena Vista	
10	Chaffee County Poor Farm	Chaffee County Poor Farm	May 16, 1985 (#85001062)	8495 County Road 160; 38°33′07″N 106°01′57″W	Salida	
11	Cleora Cemetery	Cleora Cemetery	March 27, 2017 (#100000784)	Southern side of U.S. Route 50, 1.4 miles (2.3 km) east of Salida; 38°30′49″N 105°58′40″W	Salida	
12	Comanche Drive-In	Comanche Drive-In	August 3, 2015 (#15000481)	17063 County Road 106; 38°49′24″N 106°11′02″W	Buena Vista	
13	Commercial Hotel	Commercial Hotel	July 27, 2015 (#15000460)	43255 County Road 397; 39°02′37″N 106°15′53″W	Granite	
14	E.W. Corbin House	E.W. Corbin House	November 1, 1996 (#96001239)	303 E. 5th St. 38°31′53″N 105°59′33″W	Salida	
15	Crescent Moly Mine No. 100 and Mining Camp		October 11, 2003 (#03001005)	Address Restricted	Granite	Located in the vicinity of the Vicksburg Mining Camp
16	F Street Bridge	F Street Bridge	February 4, 1985 (#85000192)	F St. 38°32′16″N 105°59′33″W	Salida	
17	William and Anna Fay House	William and Anna Fay House	July 27, 2015 (#15000461)	201 S. Colorado Ave. 38°50′30″N 106°07′43″W	Buena Vista	
18	First Baptist Church of Salida	First Baptist Church of Salida	July 1, 2024 (#100010503)	419 D Street; 38°31′56″N 105°59′32″W	Salida	
19	Gas Creek School	Gas Creek School	November 26, 2018 (#100003127)	20925 US 285; 38°43′22″N 106°05′09″W	Nathrop vicinity	
20	Gimlett/LeFevre Cabin	Gimlett/LeFevre Cabin	December 17, 2018 (#100003128)	22555 Martin St. 38°33′08″N 106°17′30″W	Garfield	
21	Grace Episcopal Church	Grace Episcopal Church	January 20, 1978 (#78000834)	Main and Park Ave. 38°50′27″N 106°07′57″W	Buena Vista	
22	Garret and Julia Gray Cottage	Garret and Julia Gray Cottage	September 12, 1980 (#80000884)	125 E. 5th St. 38°31′56″N 105°59′40″W	Salida	
23	Head Lettuce Day-Collegiate Peaks Stampede Rodeo Grounds	Head Lettuce Day-Collegiate Peaks Stampede Rodeo Grounds	November 7, 2016 (#16000758)	2001 Gregg Dr. 38°49′23″N 106°09′17″W	Buena Vista	
24	Heister House	Heister House	October 8, 2008 (#08000965)	102 Poncha Boulevard; 38°30′56″N 105°59′49″W	Salida	
25	Hutchinson Ranch	Hutchinson Ranch	May 11, 1973 (#73000463)	2 miles east of Poncha Springs on U.S. Route 50; also 8911 W. U.S. Route 50; 38°30′56″N 106°02′33″W	Poncha Springs	Second address represents a boundary increase
26	F.A. Jackson House	F.A. Jackson House	April 15, 1999 (#99000445)	401 E. 1st St. 38°32′02″N 105°59′17″W	Salida	
27	Jacobs Building	Jacobs Building	December 22, 2011 (#11000946)	414 Main St. 38°50′36″N 106°07′42″W	Buena Vista	
28	Kelley-McDonald House	Kelley-McDonald House	July 27, 2015 (#15000462)	108 S. Pleasant Ave. 38°50′24″N 106°08′14″W	Buena Vista	
29	Littlejohn Mine Complex		December 27, 1978 (#78000835)	Southwest of Granite; 38°57′15″N 106°18′49″W	Granite	
30	Manhattan Hotel	Manhattan Hotel	April 21, 1983 (#83001302)	225 F St. 38°31′54″N 105°59′10″W	Salida	
31	Maxwell Park School	Maxwell Park School	December 7, 2020 (#100005853)	Northwest corner, Jct. of Cty. Rds. 321 and 326; 38°47′46″N 106°08′49″W	Buena Vista vicinity	
32	Maysville School	Maysville School	April 29, 1999 (#99000484)	South of U.S. Route 50; 38°32′22″N 106°11′24″W	Maysville	
33	McFadden Barn	McFadden Barn	March 31, 2022 (#100007490)	18840 Mountain View Dr. 38°57′46″N 106°13′00″W	Buena Vista vicinity	Bank barn built in 1900-01.
34	McFadden Brothers Ranch East Headquarters	McFadden Brothers Ranch East Headquarters	January 20, 2023 (#100007932)	18101 Mountain View Dr. 38°57′28″N 106°12′20″W	Buena Vista vicinity	
35	Morley Bridge	Morley Bridge	August 14, 2003 (#03000744)	County Road 297 at milepost 2.40; 38°40′30″N 106°21′53″W	Romley	Pratt truss railroad bridge built in 1881.
36	Nachtrieb-Kelly Ranch	Nachtrieb-Kelly Ranch	March 27, 2017 (#100000785)	25887 County Road 319; 38°47′41″N 106°07′57″W	Buena Vista	Historic ranch
37	Ohio-Colorado Smelting and Refining Company Smokestack	Ohio-Colorado Smelting and Refining Company Smokestack	January 11, 1976 (#76000548)	Northeast of Salida at the junction of County Roads 150 and 152; 38°33′07″N 106°01′25″W	Salida	
38	Pedro-Botz House	Pedro-Botz House	July 27, 2015 (#15000463)	7467 County Road 150; 38°32′52″N 106°00′53″W	Salida	
39	Pine Hall	Pine Hall	November 7, 2016 (#16000759)	43145 County Road 397; 39°02′37″N 106°15′53″W	Granite	
40	Poncha Springs Schoolhouse	Poncha Springs Schoolhouse	January 25, 1990 (#89002375)	330 Burnett St. 38°30′53″N 106°04′17″W	Poncha Springs	
41	Rock Ledge Ranch-Franzel Ranch	Rock Ledge Ranch-Franzel Ranch	July 27, 2015 (#15000464)	17975 County Road 338; 38°49′27″N 106°12′03″W	Buena Vista	
42	St. Elmo Historic District	St. Elmo Historic District	September 17, 1979 (#79000577)	Pitkin, Gunnison, 1st, Main, and Poplar Sts. 38°42′17″N 106°20′42″W	St. Elmo	
43	Salida Downtown Historic District	Salida Downtown Historic District	June 14, 1984 (#84000800)	Roughly bounded by the Arkansas River, railroad tracks, 3rd and D Sts. 38°32′08″N 105°59′26″W	Salida	
44	Salida Livestock Commission Company	Salida Livestock Commission Company	July 27, 2015 (#15000465)	5005 E. U.S. Route 50; 38°30′44″N 105°58′16″W	Salida	
45	Smith-Friskey Ranch		March 27, 2017 (#100000786)	County Road 339, 0.5 miles west of the road 38°48′54″N 106°11′03″W	Buena Vista	
46	Valley View School	Valley View School	October 12, 2003 (#03001006)	8465 County Road 140; 38°32′09″N 106°02′33″W	Salida	
47	Vicksburg Mining Camp	Vicksburg Mining Camp	March 8, 1977 (#77000364)	15 miles northwest of Buena Vista on Forest Service Route 390; 38°59′55″N 106°22′34″W	Granite	Remnants of a 19th century mining community (population c. 800).
48	Winfield Mining Camp	Winfield Mining Camp	March 10, 1980 (#80000883)	19 miles northwest of Buena Vista on Forest Service Route 390; 38°59′08″N 106°26′24″W	Granite	Remnants of a 19th century mining community (population c. 1500).

== Former listing ==
	Name on the Register	Image	Date listed	Date removed	Location	City or town	Description
1	Hortense Bridge	Hortense Bridge	February 4, 1985 (#85000191)	April 11, 1997	State Highway 162	Nathrop	Bridge was disassembled to be relocated and was damaged and never reassembled.

== See also ==
- List of National Historic Landmarks in Colorado
- List of National Register of Historic Places in Colorado
- Bibliography of Colorado
- Geography of Colorado
- History of Colorado
- Index of Colorado-related articles
- List of Colorado-related lists
- Outline of Colorado
