= J. M. Bonney House =

Historic house in Colorado, United States

- U.S. National Register of Historic Places
- Colorado State Register of Historic Properties
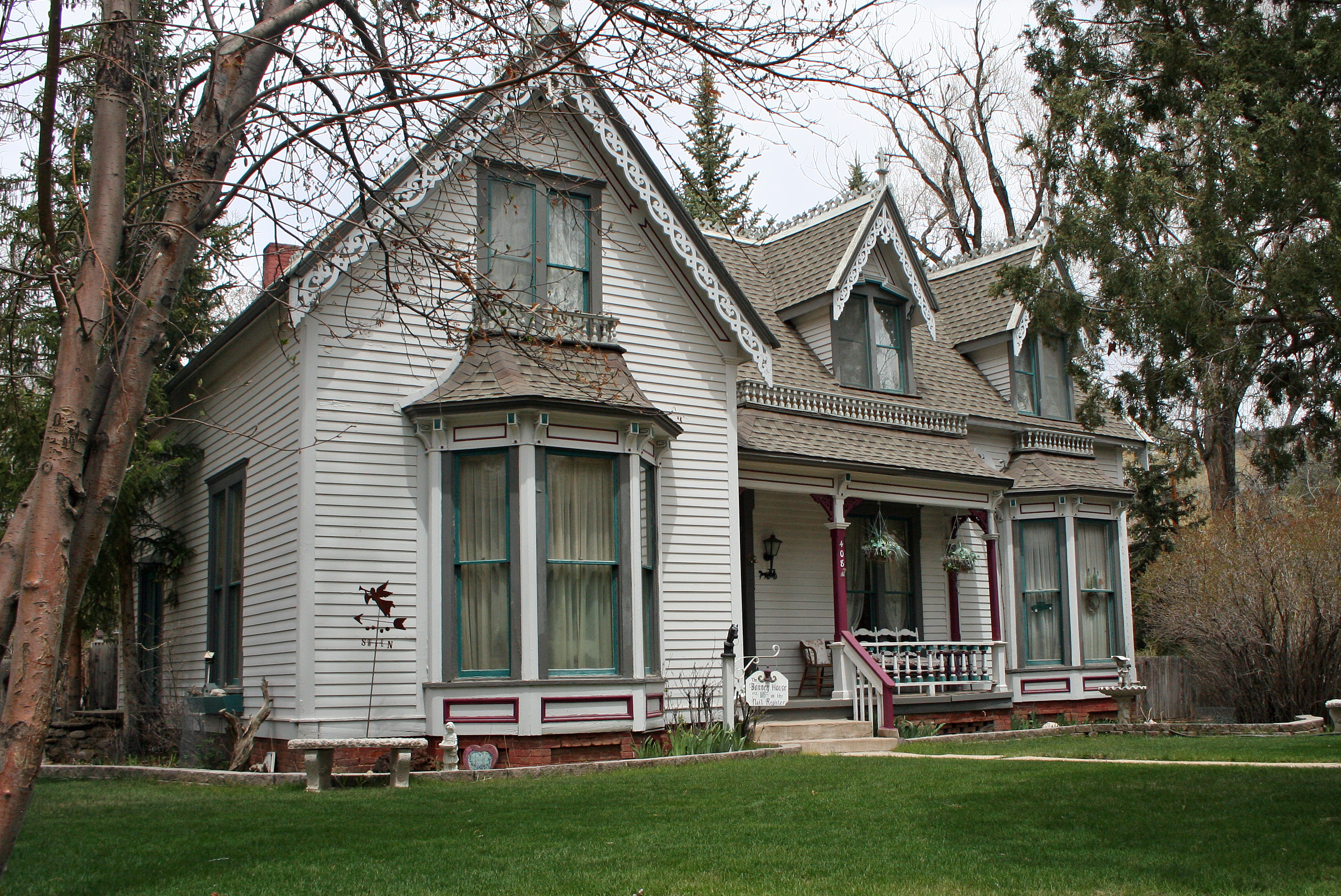

- Location within Colorado Location within the United States
- Location: 408 Princeton Ave., Buena Vista, Colorado
- Coordinates: 38°50′39″N 106°8′13″W
- Area: 1 acre (0.40 ha)
- Built: 1883
- Architectural style: Carpenter Gothic
- NRHP reference No.: 94001469
- CSRHP No.: 5CF.177
- Added to NRHP: December 19, 1994

The J. M. Bonney House, also known as the Josiah Morse Bonney House, is an historic Carpenter Gothic house located at 408 Princeton Avenue in Buena Vista, Chaffee County, Colorado. Built in 1883, it was named for Josiah Morse Bonney, who founded the First National Bank of Buena Vista, whose building at 210 East Main Street built the same year, was listed on the Colorado State Register August 9, 2000, and is now the Buena Vista Town Hall. The Bonney house is a good example of the more ornate period of Carpenter Gothic architecture and has been well preserved. On December 19, 1994, it was added to the National Register of Historic Places.

== See also ==
- National Register of Historic Places listings in Chaffee County, Colorado
