= Winfield Peak (Colorado) =

Mountain in the state of Colorado

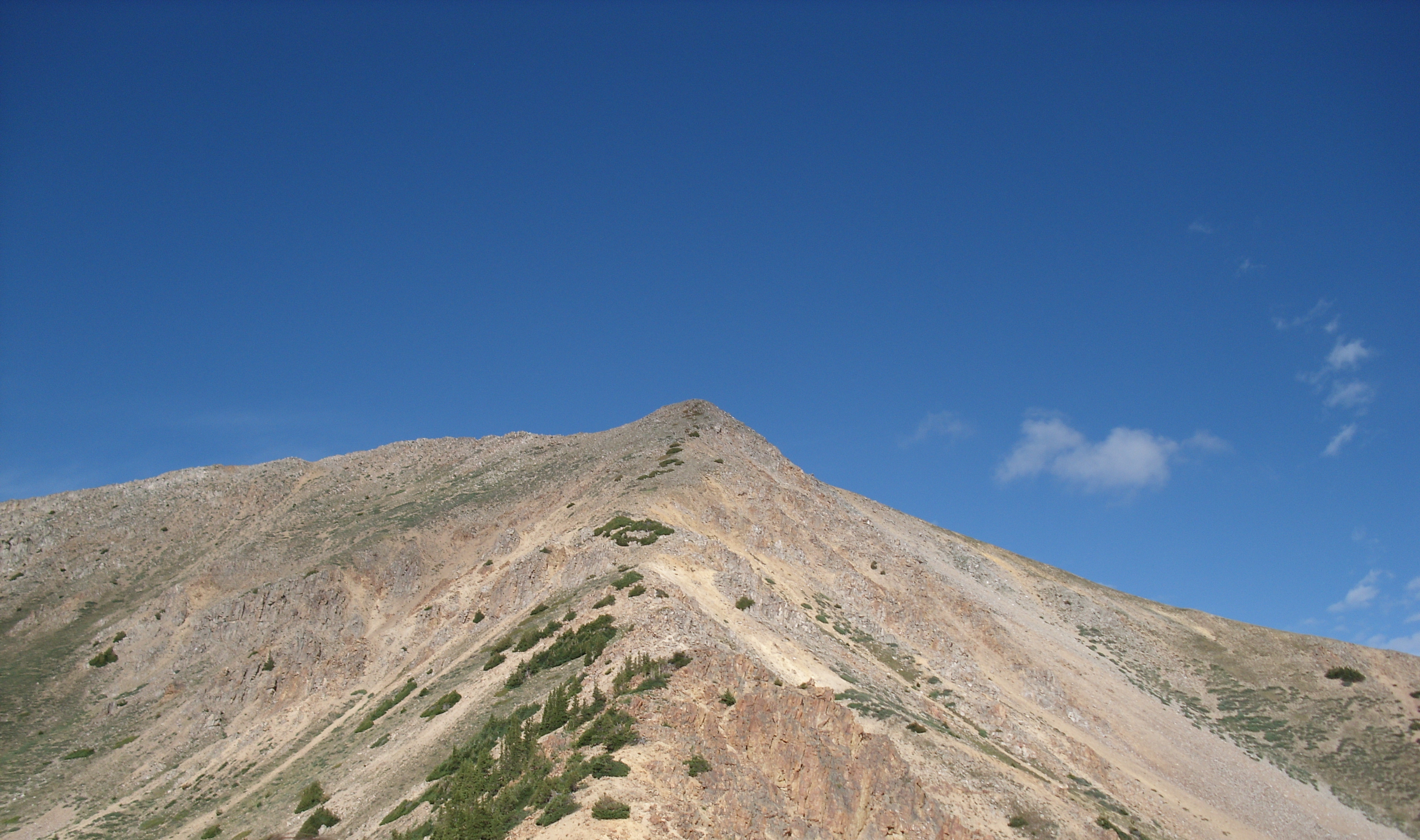
- View of the peak from the saddle

Highest point
- Elevation: 13,084 ft (3,988 m)
- Prominence: 177 ft (54 m)
- Isolation: 0.75 mi (1.21 km)
- Coordinates: 38°58′34″N 106°28′53″W

Geography
- Location within Colorado
- Location: Chaffee County, Colorado, U.S.
- Parent range: Sawatch Range, Collegiate Peaks
- Topo map(s): USGS 7.5' topographic map Winfield, Colorado

Winfield Peak is a mountain summit of the Collegiate Peaks in the Sawatch Range of the Rocky Mountains of North America. The 13,084-foot (3,988 m) summit is located in Chaffee County, Colorado, U.S., two miles north of the ghost town of Winfield.

== Historical names ==
- Middle Mountain
- Mount Winfield
- Winfield Peak – 1981

== See also ==
- List of Colorado mountain ranges
- List of Colorado mountain summits
  - List of Colorado fourteeners
  - List of Colorado 4000 meter prominent summits
  - List of the most prominent summits of Colorado
- List of Colorado county high points
