= Maxwell Park School =

- U.S. National Register of Historic Places
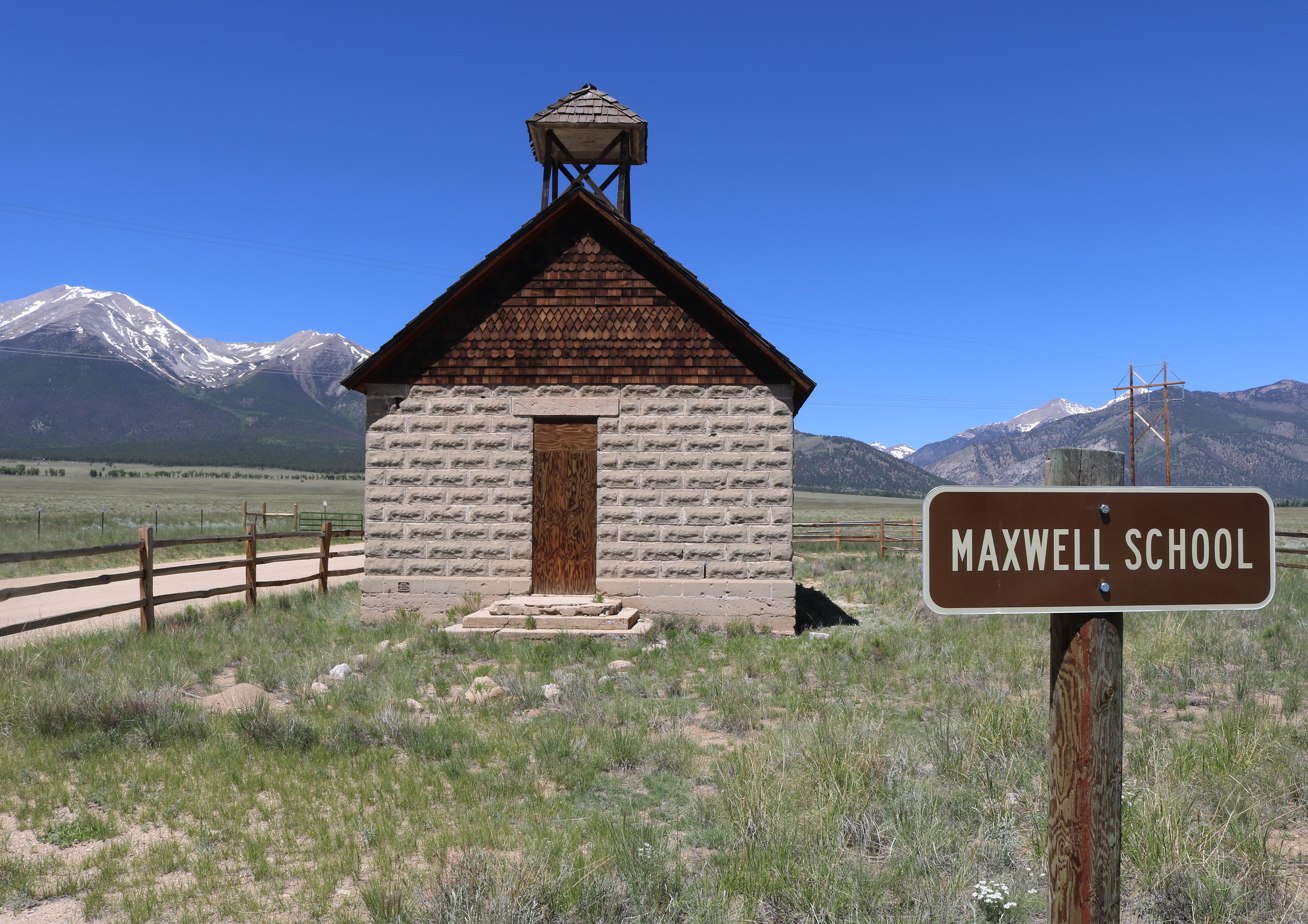
- The school in 2023

- Location within Colorado
- Location: Northwest corner, Jct. of Cty. Rds. 321 and 326, Chaffee County, Colorado, near Buena Vista, Colorado
- Coordinates: 38°47′46″N 106°08′49″W
- Built: 1912
- MPS: Rural School Buildings in Colorado MPS
- NRHP reference No.: 100005853
- Added to NRHP: December 7, 2020

The Maxwell Park School, in Chaffee County, Colorado near Buena Vista, Colorado was built in 1912, replacing an earlier, wooden building built in 1889. It was listed on the National Register of Historic Places in 2020.

It is a rural one-room schoolhouse, about 31 by 26 feet (9.4 m × 7.9 m) in plan. According to nearby ranch owner Suze Kelly,

The school building was built of handmade cement blocks and you can see the hand and fingerprints in the blocks. The Centerville school, now gone, was also built of these blocks. The blocks are from 18-23 inches long and hollow; the cement is rough and full of rocks. The kitchen addition on the Kelly ranch house is also built of these same blocks. There are fish scale shingles on gables at the peak at front and back of the school. ... There is a bell tower (minus the bell) on the front of the roof. ...Behind the school building was a barn for the kids to keep their horses in while they were in school for the day.

The school building and the earlier structure it replaced served as a school from 1889 to 1933, during which time there were 25 female teachers and one male teacher. Some of these lived at the Nachtrieb ranch, 1.5 miles (2.4 km) away, and rode a horse to school. The Nachtrieb ranch became the Kelly ranch in 1951, and was listed on the National Register as Nachtrieb-Kelly Ranch in 2017.

It is located 3 miles (4.8 km) south of Buena Vista at the northwest corner of the junction of Chaffee County Roads 321 and 326.
