= Grace Church (Buena Vista, Colorado) =

Historic church in Colorado, United States

- Grace Episcopal Church
- U.S. National Register of Historic Places
- Colorado State Register of Historic Properties
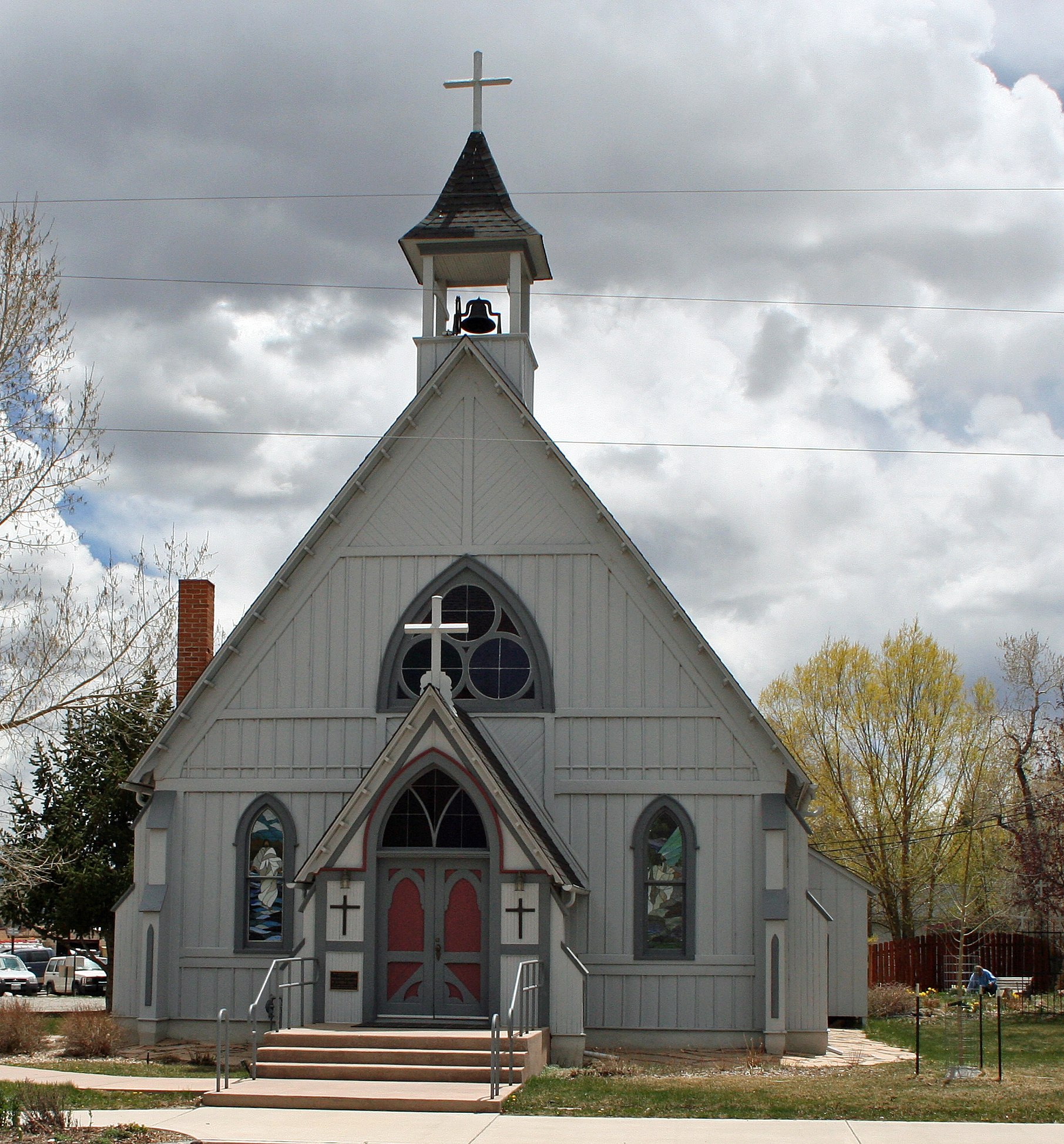

- Location within Colorado Location within the United States
- Location: 203 W. Main St., Buena Vista, Colorado
- Coordinates: 38°50′27″N 106°7′57″W
- Area: less than one acre
- Built: 1889
- Built by: Lannan Brothers
- Architectural style: Carpenter Gothic
- NRHP reference No.: 78000834
- CSRHP No.: 5CF.141
- Added to NRHP: January 20, 1978

Grace Church, formerly the Grace Episcopal Church, is a historic Carpenter Gothic style church building located in Buena Vista, Chaffee County, Colorado. Originally built as an Episcopal church in 1889 by the Lannan Brothers, its Carpenter Gothic details include board and batten siding, lancet windows and door openings and buttresses. On January 20, 1978, it was added to the National Register of Historic Places. On February 7, 2007, the church received of the Colorado Historic Society's 21st Annual Stephen H. Hart Awards for its restoration of the interior and exterior of the building.

In 2002, Grace Episcopal Church and the local United Methodist congregation formed a federated congregation with the approval of their respective denominational authorities. The United Methodist Congregation now styles itself Grace United Methodist Faith Community. Each one retains its separate corporate organization while worshiping together. Services on the first and third Sundays are led by a United Methodist minister while services are the second and third Sundays are led by an Episcopal priest.

In 2023, the church reported 72 members. No membership statistics were reported in 2024 national parochial reports. Average Sunday Attendance (ASA) reported by the church in 2024 was 31 persons.

== See also ==
- National Register of Historic Places listings in Chaffee County, Colorado
