= Brown's Canyon Bridge =

Historic bridge in Colorado, USA

- U.S. National Register of Historic Places
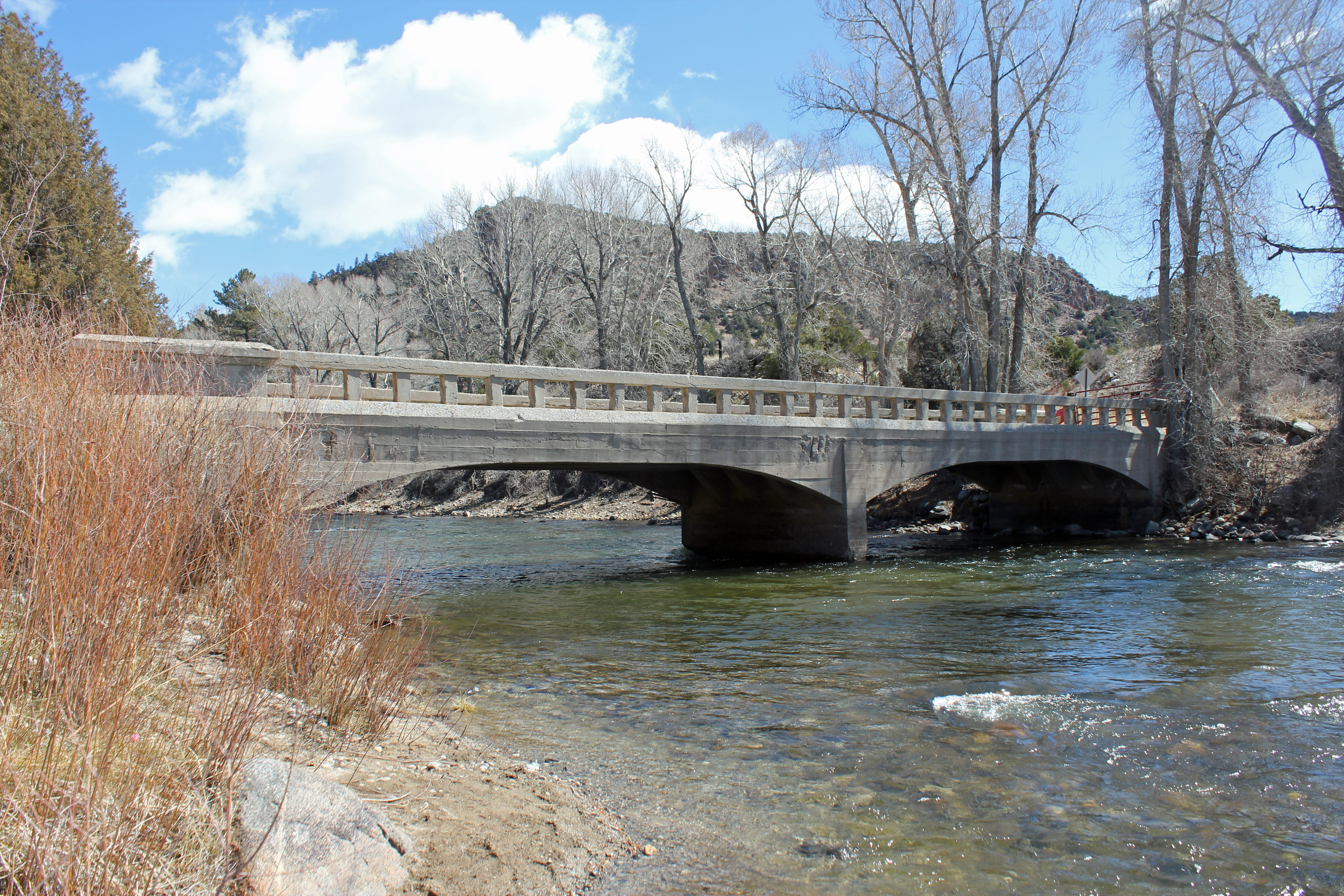

- Location within Colorado
- Nearest city: Salida, Colorado
- Coordinates: 38.61274°N 106.06188°W
- Area: Less than one acre
- Built: 1908
- Built by: Pueblo Bridge Company
- Engineer: T.W. Jaycox, Colorado State Engineer
- Architectural style: Concrete slab and girder
- MPS: Highway Bridges in Colorado MPS
- NRHP reference No.: 13000554
- Added to NRHP: July 30, 2013

The Brown's Canyon Bridge near Salida, Colorado, also known as Stone Bridge, is a concrete "slab and girder" road bridge across the Arkansas River built in 1908.

According to History Colorado, "The 1908 Brown’s Canyon Bridge is significant for its engineering as an intact early example of a reinforced concrete slab and girder bridge. With a design provided by the State Engineer’s Office, the completion of the bridge preceded the formal development of the highway commission in Colorado in 1909." Historians have talked about the work of Thomas Ehrhart, Chafee County commissioner and former state legislator who lobbied for the bridge on the state level. It was listed on the National Register of Historic Places in 2013.

It is approached by County Road 191 (CR 191) and originally brought Colorado State Primary Road 17 across the Arkansas River, connecting the mining town of Leadville to Salida and Buena Vista. It is now a link to private property. The use of CR 191 as the major north-south route in the Arkansas Valley, connecting Salida to Buena Vista, was replaced by State Highway 291 before 1963.

== Architecture ==
It has two 40-foot (12 m) spans and is 86 feet (26 m) long. Its roadway is 18 feet (5.5 m) wide. It is supported by a concrete center pier and two concrete end abutments.

Its design is credited to T.W. Jaycox, Colorado State Engineer, and it was built by the Pueblo Bridge Company.

It was documented in the Highway Bridges in Colorado multiple property submission, and although concrete slab and girder bridges are common in Colorado, the Brown's Canyon bridge and the Capulin Bridge in Conejos County are notable as the two oldest intact slab and girder bridges in the state.

The National Register nomination states, "The Highway Bridges in Colorado Multiple Property Documentation Form notes the bridge as the most architecturally sophisticated of the early reinforced concrete slab and girder bridges in Colorado. It exhibits curved springers, an articulated balustrade, and two dedication plaques."
