= McFadden Barn =

Historic building in Colorado

- U.S. National Register of Historic Places
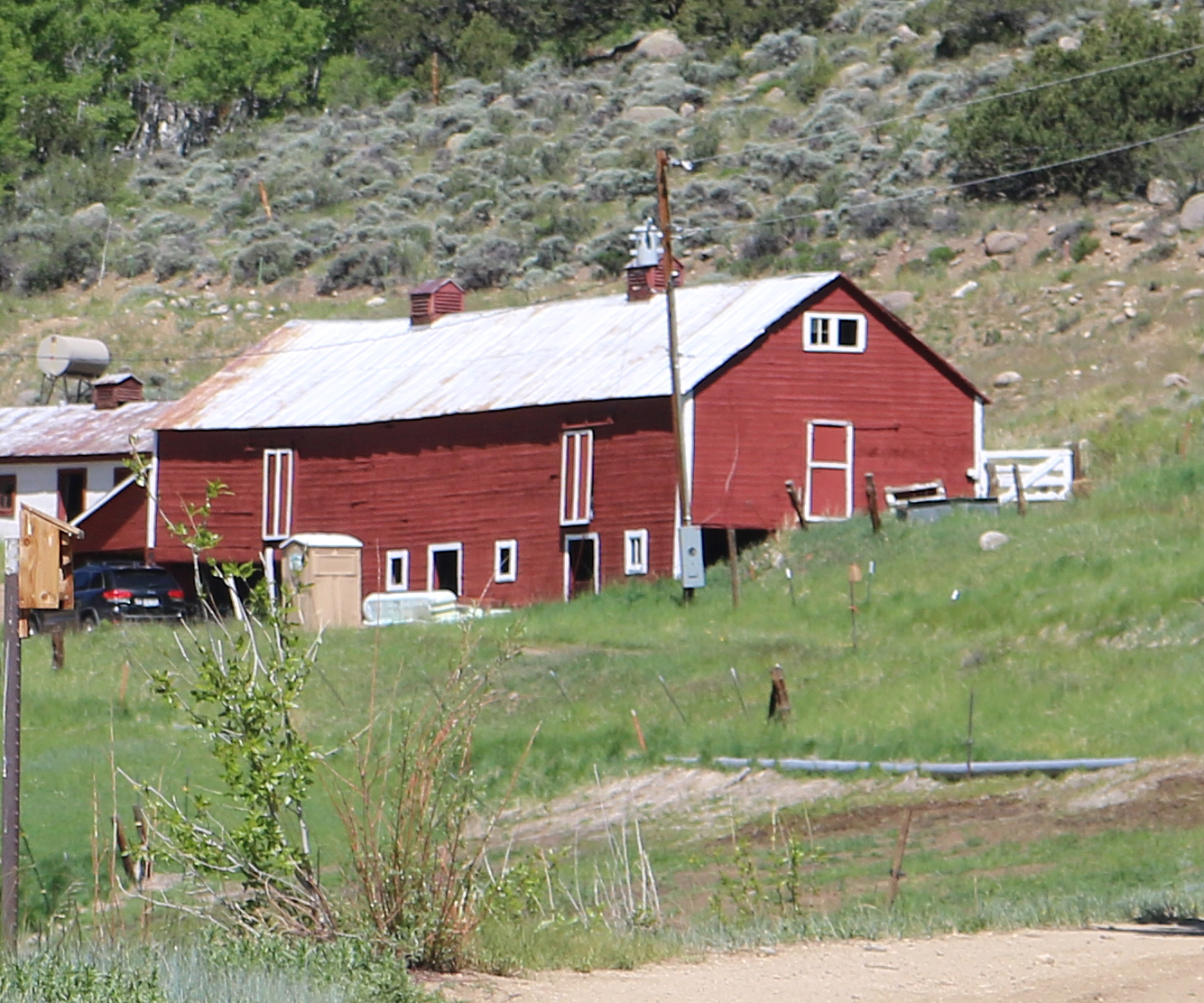
- The barn in 2023

- Location within Colorado
- Location: 18840 Mountain View Dr., Chaffee County, Colorado, near Buena Vista, Colorado
- Coordinates: 38.96287°N 106.21680°W
- Area: .14 acres (0.057 ha)
- Built: 1900-01
- NRHP reference No.: 100007490
- Added to NRHP: March 31, 2022

The McFadden Barn, near Buena Vista in Chaffee County, Colorado, is a bank barn built in 1900-01. It was listed on the National Register of Historic Places in 2022.

Its NRHP nomination was a project of Front Range Research Associates, Inc., who reported that dendrochronological testing would be used to date a log cabin on the property.

In fact the final nomination stated that the McFadden Barn was erected 1900-01, based on the dendrochronological analysis. It is a rectangular 81 by 20 feet (24.7 m × 6.1 m) barn facing south-southeast. It has an original 68 by 20 feet (20.7 m × 6.1 m) gabled roof section on the east and a smaller 13 by 20 feet (4.0 m × 6.1 m), lower, shed-roof western section. This latter seems to be an historic era addition. It is built on a dry laid fieldstone foundation, although repairs recently before the nomination had mortared some parts of the wall.

The lower level, accessed from the south, has two open bays for vehicle and other storage on its west side, and its east side is enclosed.

Its upper level was described as being "clad with flush horizontal tongue-and-groove boards with corner boards" and it topped by two cupolas and lightning arrestors.

It was deemed "locally significant... for its architecture, as a large example of an early twentieth century bank barn in Chaffee County, Colorado. The building also is notable for its log post and beam construction with unusual joinery."

The McFadden homestead was established in 1881.
