= Vicksburg, Colorado =

- Vicksburg Mining Camp
- U.S. National Register of Historic Places
- U.S. Historic district
- Colorado State Register of Historic Properties
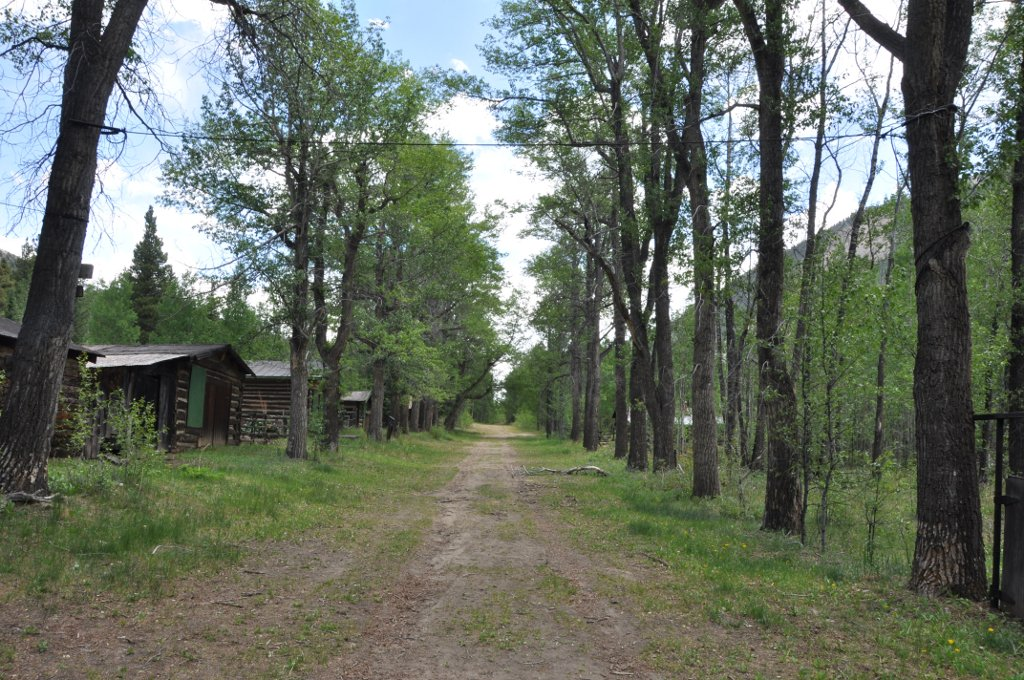
- Main Street

- Location within Colorado Location within the United States
- Coordinates: 38°59′55″N 106°22′34″W
- NRHP reference No.: 77000364
- CSRHP No.: 5CF.136
- Added to NRHP: March 8, 1977

Vicksburg was a town and mining camp in Chaffee County, Colorado (near the village of Granite), high in Clear Creek Canyon. It is now effectively a ghost town, although some of the buildings may be seasonally occupied by their owners. The site was listed on the National Register of Historic Places in 1977 (as Vicksburg Mining Camp); a part of the town is maintained by the Chaffee County Historical Society as a museum. Four miles farther up the same road on which Vicksburg is located is another old mining camp named Winfield.

== History ==
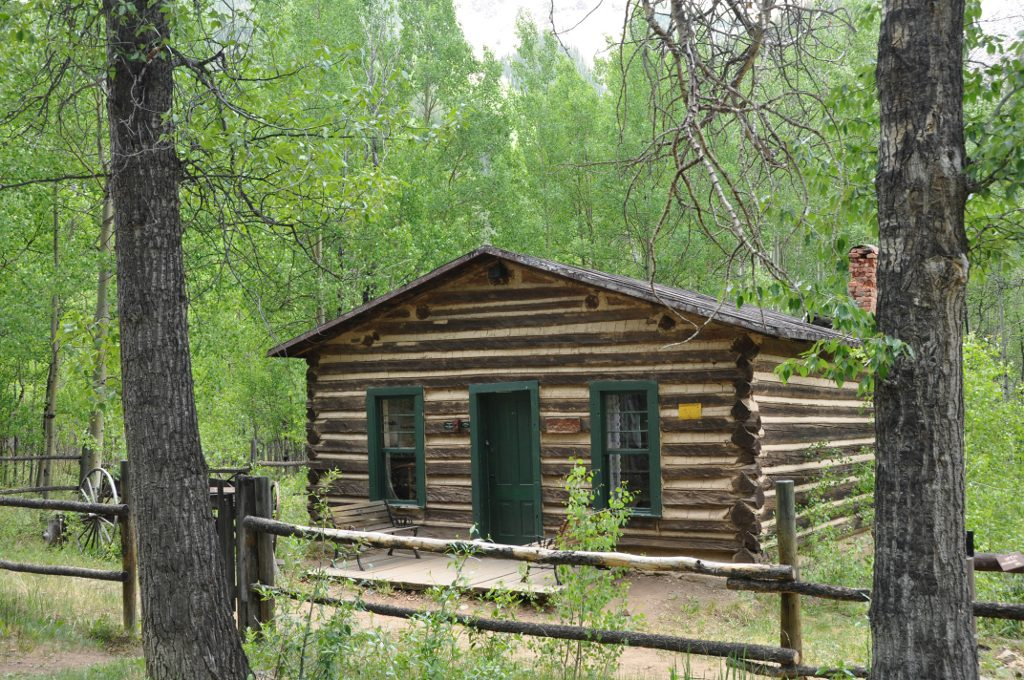
Early cabin

Vicksburg was founded in 1867 after prospectors from Leadville, Colorado camping out in the Clear Creek Canyon lost their burros. The burros had wandered down the creek and when the miners found their pack animals, they discovered gold in the creek bed as well. In its heyday, Vicksburg had a post office, school, blacksmith, two hotels, two billiard halls, several saloons, a general store, an assay office, and a livery stable. Early miners packed in Balm of Gilead (balsam poplar) trees on the backs of burros and planted them to line the street. The trees still stand today and are watered by ditches leading from Vicksburg Creek into the town. The ditches were dug on either side of the street to provide a water system; wooden boxes were built in the ditches to keep food cold and provide water to fight fires.

== See also ==
- National Register of Historic Places listings in Chaffee County, Colorado
