= Banana Mountain, Colorado =

Mountain located in Chaffee County, Colorado, United States

Banana Mountain

Highest point
- Elevation: 12,326 ft (3,757 m)
- Prominence: 240 ft (73 m)
- Isolation: 0.48 mi (0.77 km)
- Coordinates: 38°32′55.91″N 106°20′7.83″W

Banana Mountain is a mountain located in Chaffee County, Colorado, United States. The coordinates are 38.5489°N, 106.3355°W. It has an elevation of 12,326 feet (3,757 meters).
