= Chaffee County Poor Farm =

- U.S. National Register of Historic Places
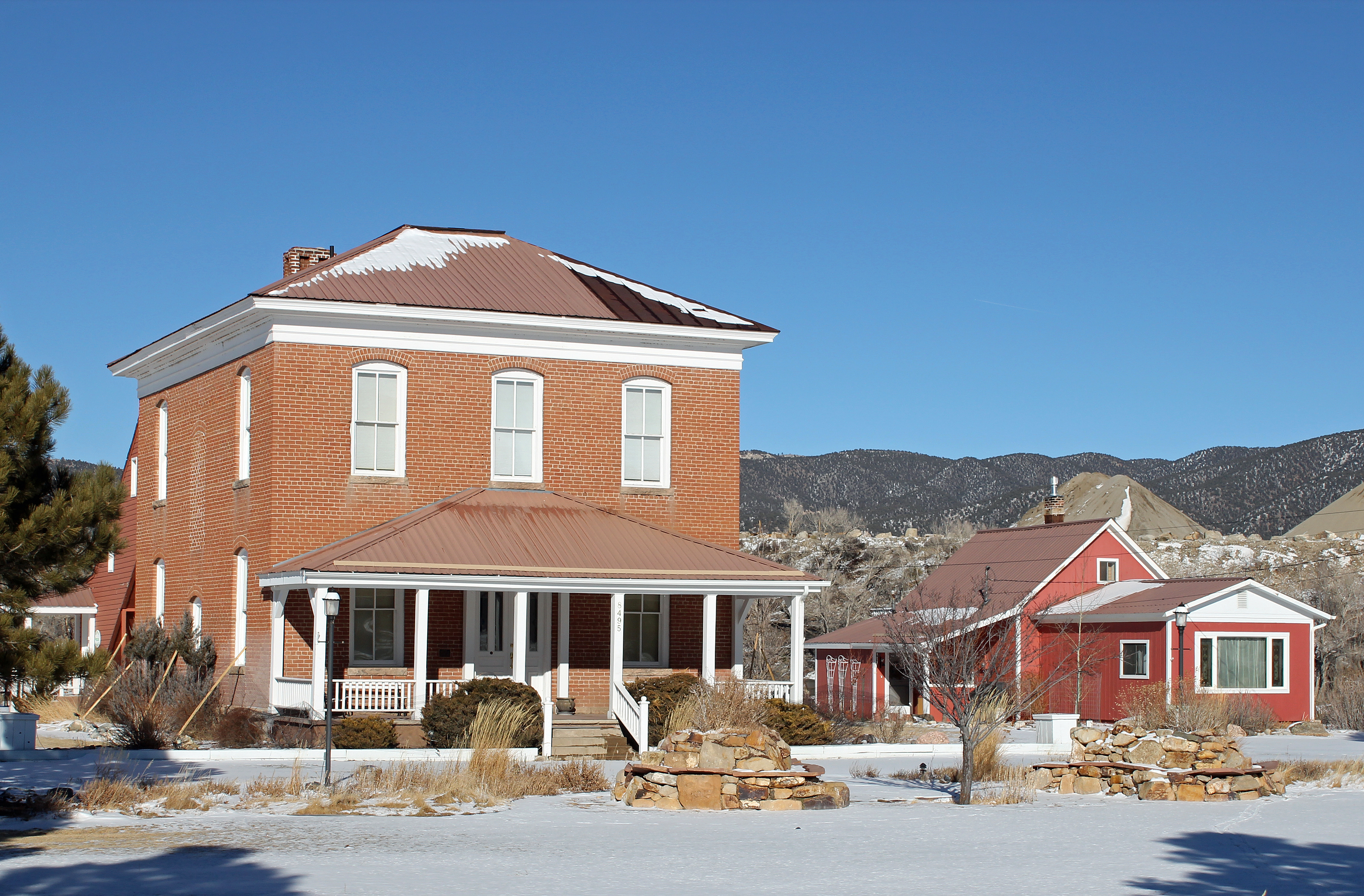

- Location within Colorado
- Nearest city: Salida, Colorado
- Coordinates: 38°33′07″N 106°01′57″W
- Area: 4 acres (1.6 ha)
- Built: 1891
- Built by: Lawrence Bros.
- Architectural style: Colonial Revival
- NRHP reference No.: 85001062
- Added to NRHP: May 16, 1985

The Chaffee County Poor Farm, near Salida, Colorado, was established in 1891. It was listed on the National Register of Historic Places in 1985. The listing included three contributing buildings.

Its buildings were built in 1892 by Buena Vista, Colorado contractors Lawrence Bros.

It is located at 8495 County Road 160.
