= Jacobs Building (Buena Vista, Colorado) =

- U.S. National Register of Historic Places
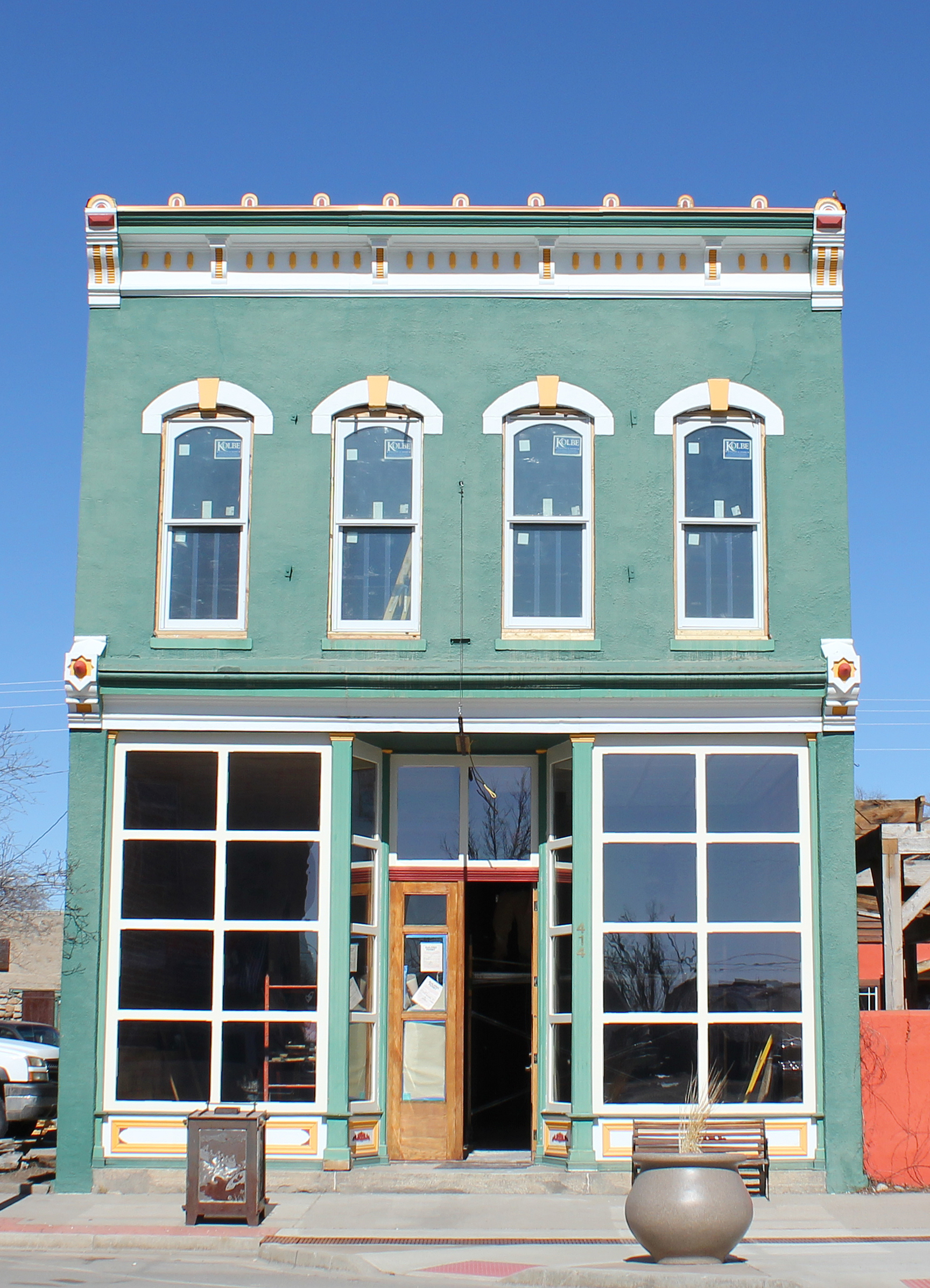

- Location within Colorado
- Location: 414 Main St., Buena Vista, Colorado
- Coordinates: 38°50′36″N 106°07′42″W
- Area: less than one acre
- Built: 1888
- Built by: Lannon Brothers
- Architectural style: Italianate
- NRHP reference No.: 11000946
- Added to NRHP: December 22, 2011

The Jacobs Building, at 414 Main St. in Buena Vista, Colorado, was built in 1888. It was listed on the National Register of Historic Places in 2011. The listing included two contributing buildings and a contributing structure, with one apparently being a jailhouse.

It has served as a restaurant and hotel, and has been known as Johnson Building and as Mother's Bistro.

In 2019, the Historic Preservation Commission of Buena Vista was considering an application to list "the Jailhouse Building located at 412 E. Main Street as a local historic building subject to the requirements of Section 19 of the Town of Buena Vista Municipal Code." The jailhouse building was covered in the National Register listing already; the local listing would strengthen local protection for the building.
