= Valley View School (Salida, Colorado) =

- U.S. National Register of Historic Places
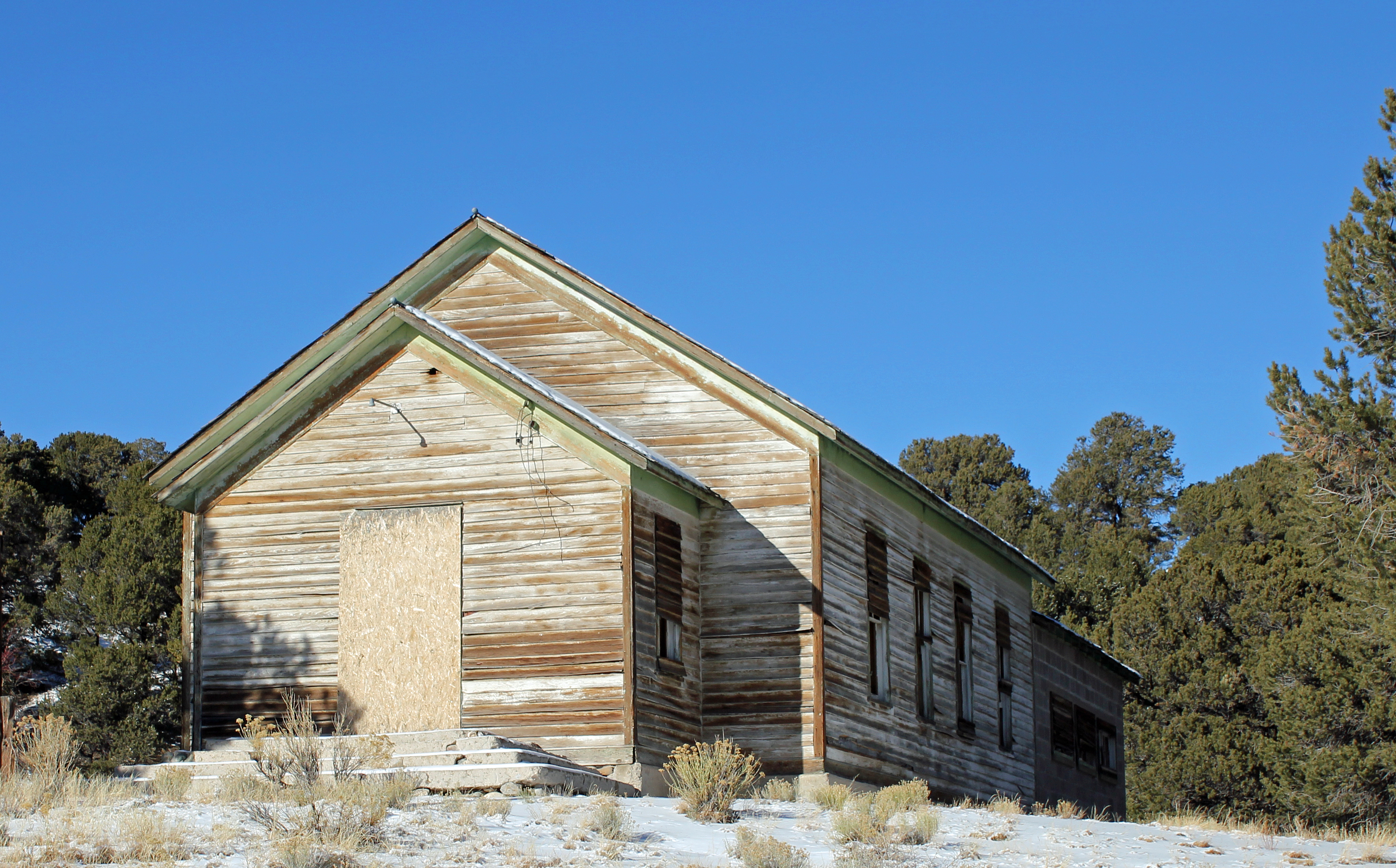

- Location within Colorado
- Location: 8465 Co. Rd. 140, Chaffee County, Colorado, near Salida, Colorado
- Coordinates: 38°32′09″N 106°02′33″W
- Area: less than one acre
- Built: 1903; 1936
- Built by: Works Progress Administration (WPA)
- Architectural style: Rural Schoolhouse
- MPS: Rural School Buildings in Colorado MPS
- NRHP reference No.: 03001006
- Added to NRHP: October 12, 2003

The Valley View School, at 8465 County Road 140 about 2 miles (3.2 km) west of Salida, Colorado was built in 1903. It was listed on the National Register of Historic Places in 2003.

It is a rural one-story wood frame schoolhouse built in part by the Works Progress Administration.

It has a south-facing 36.33 by 22.33 feet (11.07 m × 6.81 m) clapboarded main section and a 25 by 22.33 feet (7.62 m × 6.81 m) concrete block addition. The addition was built by the Works Progress Administration in 1936.

Two privies are additional contributing buildings in the listing.
