= Alexander House (Salida, Colorado) =

Historic house in Colorado, United States

- U.S. National Register of Historic Places
- Colorado State Register of Historic Properties
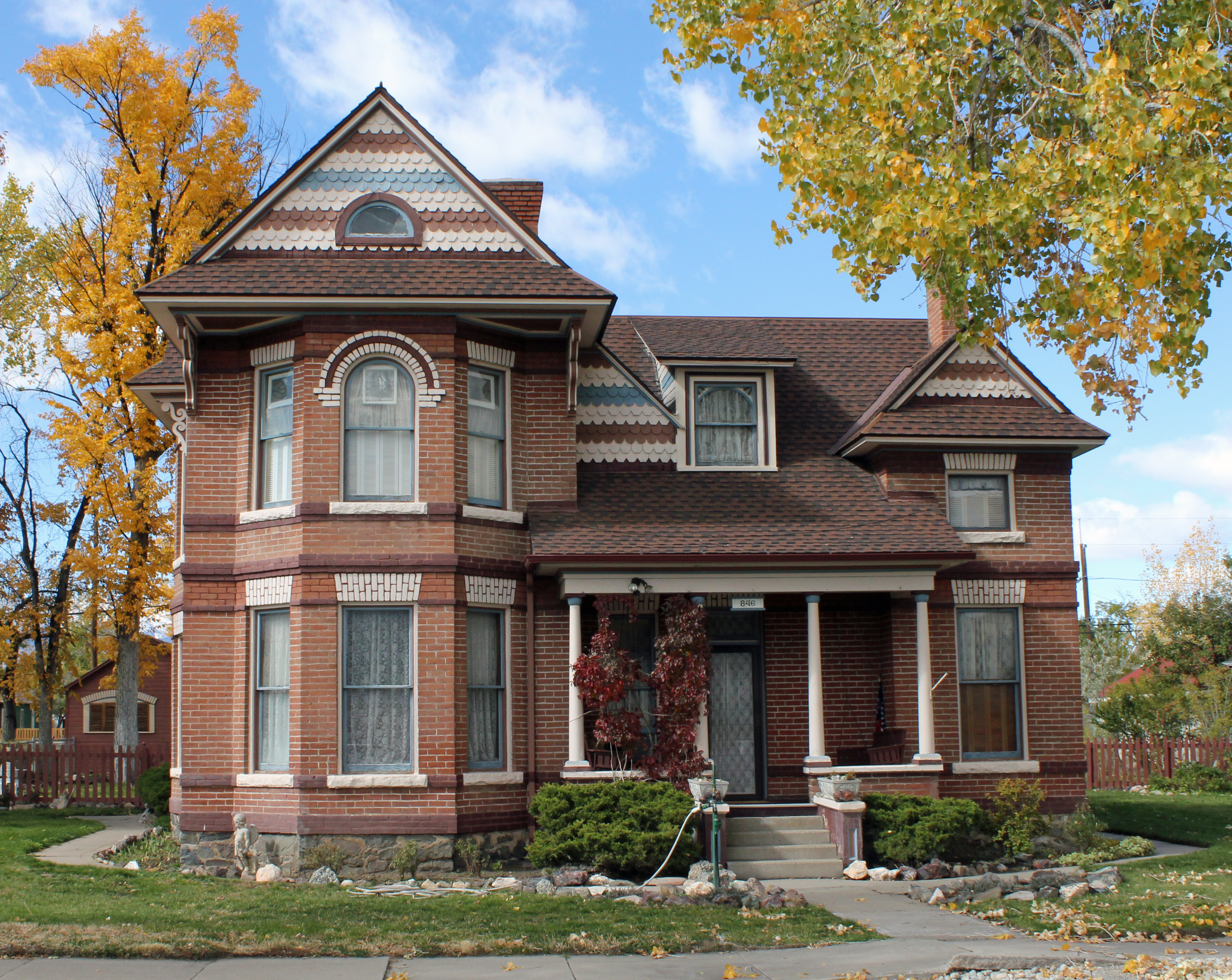

- Location within Colorado Location within the United States
- Location: 846 F St., Salida, Colorado
- Coordinates: 38.52992°N 105.99848°W
- Built: 1901
- Architectural style: Queen Anne
- NRHP reference No.: 07001148
- CSRHP No.: 5CF.2048
- Added to NRHP: November 7, 2007

Alexander House, also known as Churcher House and Gloyd House, is located at 846 F St. in Salida, Colorado. The Queen Anne style house was built in 1901. It is significant for its architecture, and was added to the National Register of Historic Places in 2007.

It is a two-story 44 by 34 feet (13 m × 10 m) brick house on a dark stone foundation, with a complex roof and with front and side porches.

== See also ==
- National Register of Historic Places listings in Chaffee County, Colorado
