= Maysville School =

- U.S. National Register of Historic Places
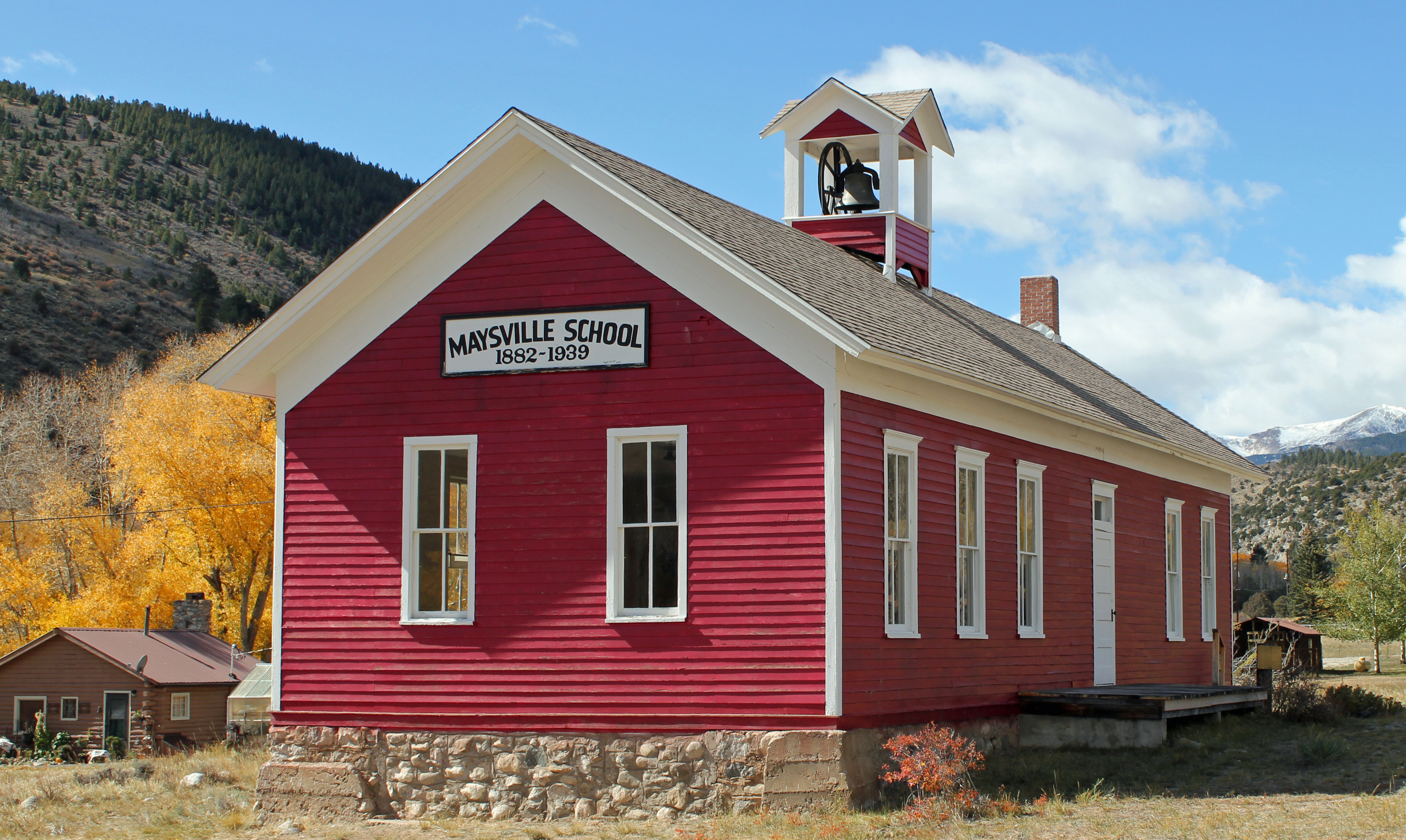
- Schoolhouse in 2011

- Location within Colorado
- Location: S of US 50, Maysville, Colorado
- Coordinates: 38°32′22″N 106°11′24″W
- Area: less than one acre
- Built: 1912
- Architectural style: Rural Schoolhouse
- MPS: Rural School Buildings in Colorado MPS
- NRHP reference No.: 99000484
- Added to NRHP: April 29, 1999

The Maysville School in Maysville, Colorado, also known as the Maysville Schoolhouse, is a schoolhouse built in 1912. It was listed on the National Register of Historic Places in 1999.

It seems the school was built as a two-story building in 1882, located centrally in a growing town area, but by 1912, when it "acquired its current configuration", the local area was rural. It is now a one-story, vernacular wood frame one-room schoolhouse. It served as a school until 1939, then as a private house, and in 1948 it was modified to serve as a bus garage for the school district. It was sold to the Salida Museum Association in 1977 and then was restored. It hosts community meetings and the teacher's quarters serve as a museum.

It has a bell tower with bell. It is "the most intact building associated with early 20th century Maysville."

The schoolhouse is located south of U.S. Route 50.
