= Futurity, Colorado =

Unincorporated community in Chaffee County, CO, USA

Coordinates: 38°44′11″N 105°57′14″W

Futurity is an unincorporated community in Chaffee County, Colorado, in the United States.
