= Behrman Ranch =

- U.S. National Register of Historic Places
- Location within Colorado
- Location: 31715 US 24 N., north of Buena Vista, Colorado
- Coordinates: 38.87910°N 106.15873°W
- Area: 183 acres (0.74 km^{2})
- Built: 1919-20, c.1920, other
- NRHP reference No.: 12000143
- Added to NRHP: March 27, 2012

The Behrman Ranch, near Buena Vista, Colorado, was listed on the National Register of Historic Places in 2012.

It has seven contributing resources, including an original log home built during 1919-20 and a bunkhouse built around 1920.

The original house is a one-story 66 by 53 feet (20 m × 16 m) building, on a masonry foundation, built of square-cut pine logs, and is covered in part by wood shingles and cobblestones. It was expanded in 1942 and 1964 with round pine log additions, with chinking, built upon concrete foundations.

The property includes the site of a c.1882 bridge and the remains of a stagecoach road which ran across it. It includes three contributing structures: an irrigation lateral ditch, a cobblestone-lined pit used in preparing and rendering hogs after butchering, and a cobblestone wall.

According to History Colorado, the property is significant:

for its association with the Behrman family and the part the played in developing a productive farming property in the Upper Arkansas River Valley. / The Behrman family are a part of a long agricultural tradition that is indicative of the agricultural heritage of the region. The importance of water, irrigation systems, machinery, livestock, and cooperation with neighbors is apparent when studying the Behrman Ranch.

It is located on U.S. Route 24 and on the Arkansas River, about 3 miles (4.8 km) north of Buena Vista.
