= Chaffee County Courthouse and Jail Buildings =

- U.S. National Register of Historic Places
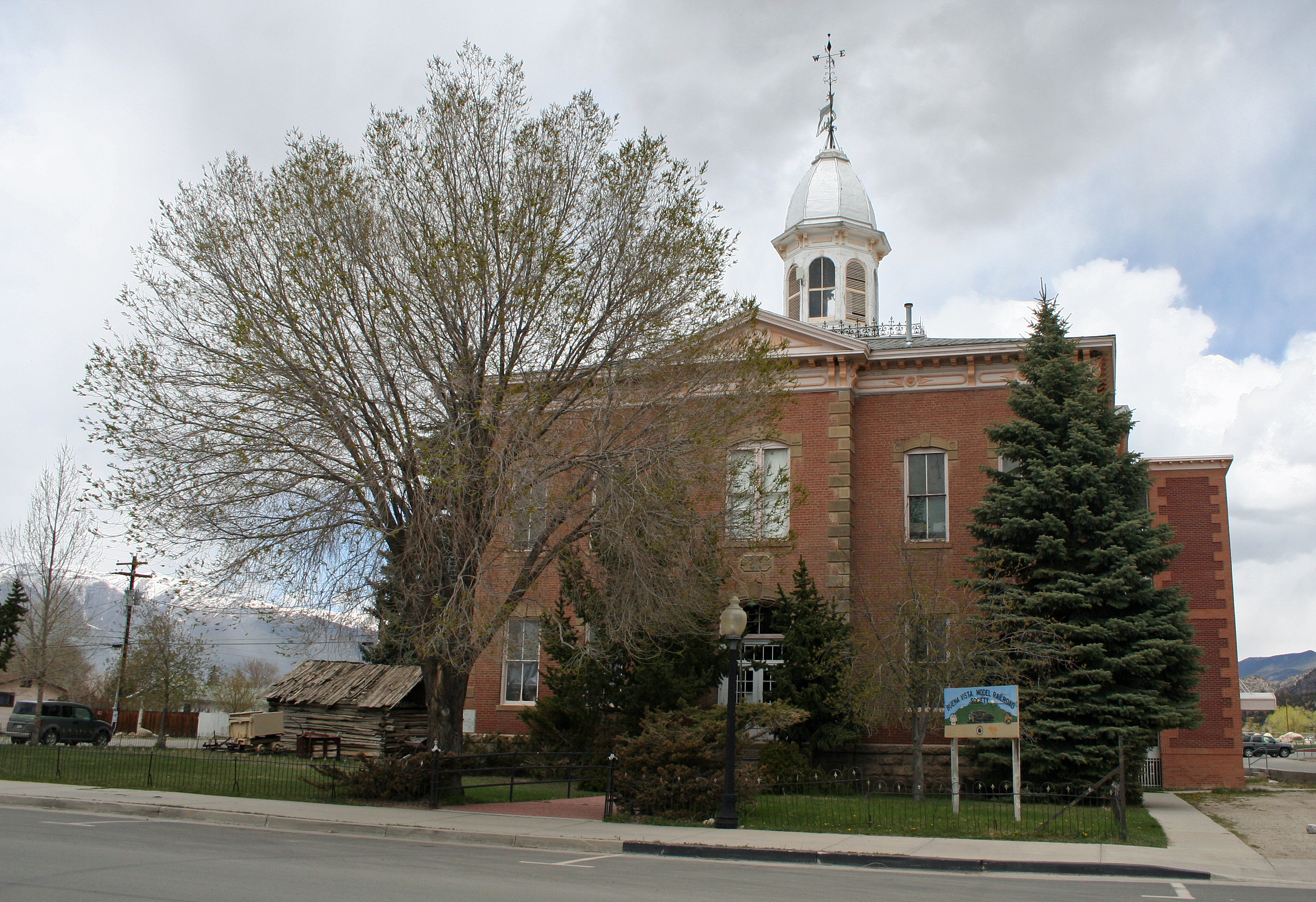

- Location within Colorado
- Location: 501 E. Main St, Buena Vista, Colorado
- Coordinates: 38°50′37″N 106°07′37″W
- Area: 0.3 acres (0.12 ha)
- Built: 1882
- Built by: Fisher, E.
- Architectural style: Italian Villa
- NRHP reference No.: 79000575
- Added to NRHP: September 10, 1979

The Chaffee County Courthouse and Jail Buildings, at 501 E. Main St. in Buena Vista, Colorado, were listed on the National Register of Historic Places in 1979.

The courthouse is a two-story five-bay brick building, with brick laid in stretcher bond, on an ashlar foundation. It was built after the county seat was switched from Salida, Colorado.

The jail is a smaller building. Both were built in 1882.

A different Chaffee County Courthouse, built in Salida in 1929 was designed by architect Walter DeMordaunt, after the county voted to move the courthouse back to Salida.
