= Gas Creek School =

- U.S. National Register of Historic Places
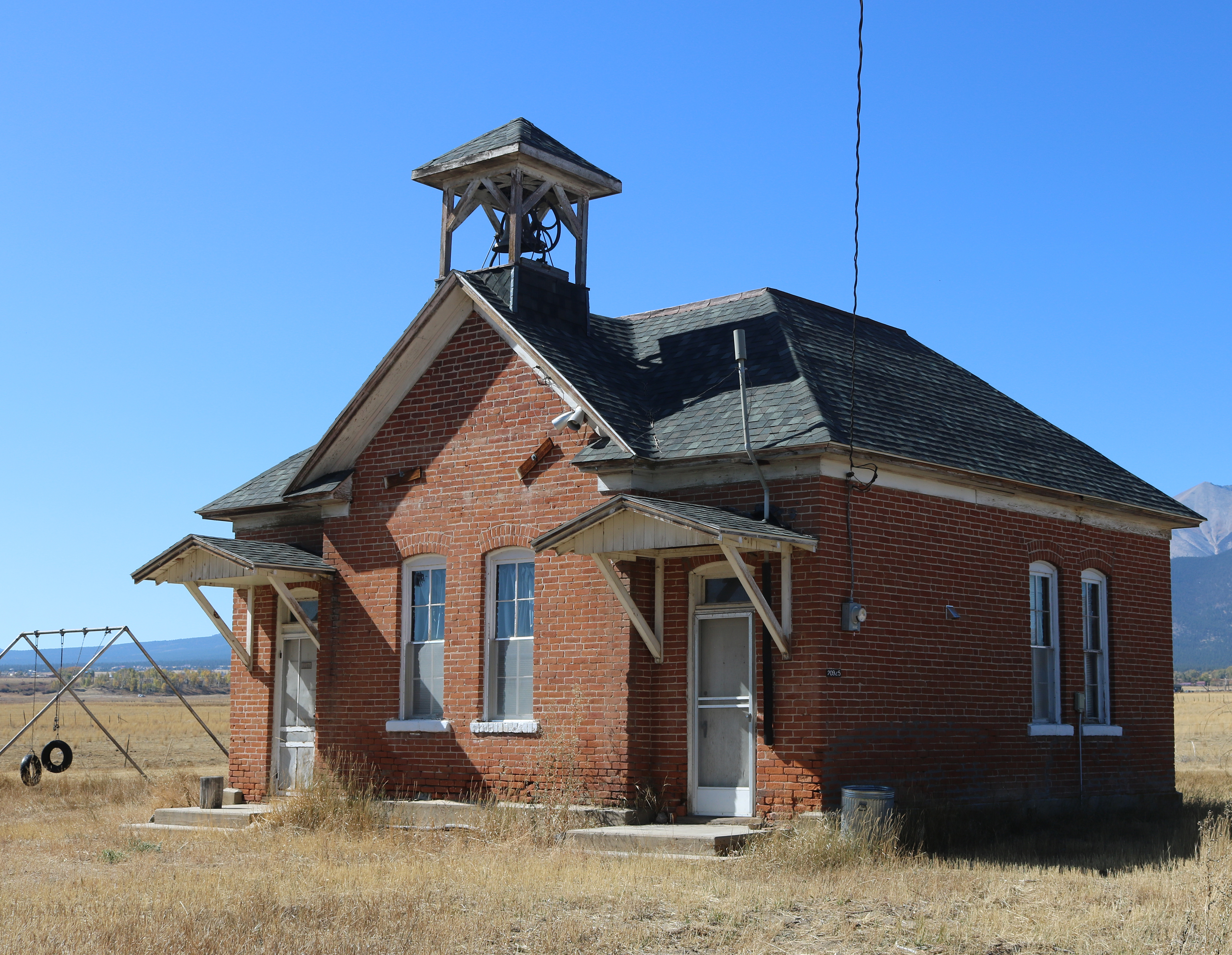
- Schoolhouse in 2019

- Location within Colorado
- Location: 20925 US 285, Chaffee County, Colorado, near Nathrop, Colorado
- Coordinates: 38°43′22″N 106°05′09″W
- Area: 1.5 acres (0.61 ha)
- Built: 1911
- MPS: Rural School Buildings in Colorado MPS
- NRHP reference No.: 100003127
- Added to NRHP: November 26, 2018

The Gas Creek School, near Nathrop, Colorado in Chaffee County, Colorado, was built in 1909. It was the only school in Chaffee County School District No. 20 and it operated from 1909 to 1958. It was listed on the National Register of Historic Places in 2018.

It is a one-story brick school building, in open land with the 14,196 feet (4,327 m) Mt. Princeton standing behind. It was built as a replacement for a wood-frame schoolhouse that was built in 1890. The school is about 30 by 26 feet (9.1 m × 7.9 m) in plan and is built of orange brick atop a raised concrete foundation. It has a hipped roof and a square bell tower holding a bell which is rung by pulling on a rope. It was a one-teacher one-room school, although it has two front doors.

A photo of the school is included in America’s Country Schools, a 1996 book by Andrew Gulliford, who stated: "'Built from a plan book, this school has double entrances with canopies and an ornate bell tower.'" He suggested the school's symmetrical design indicated it may have been taken from a plan book. He also noted that having a belfry or bell tower "usually placed above the entrance to the schoolhouse, had become a status symbol for many school districts' by the nineteenth century."

One teacher at the school was Betty Farrington, who taught fourteen students there during 1938-39 for a salary of $75 per month; there was at least one student in each grade from one to eight.

The property also includes two privies, a shed, a swing set and a seesaw.

The 1875 Frantz Ditch runs through its property.

It was deemed significant as "an exceptionally well-preserved example of a one-room rural schoolhouse", and is unusual for being built of brick.
