= Winfield, Colorado =

- Winfield Mining Camp
- U.S. National Register of Historic Places
- Colorado State Register of Historic Properties
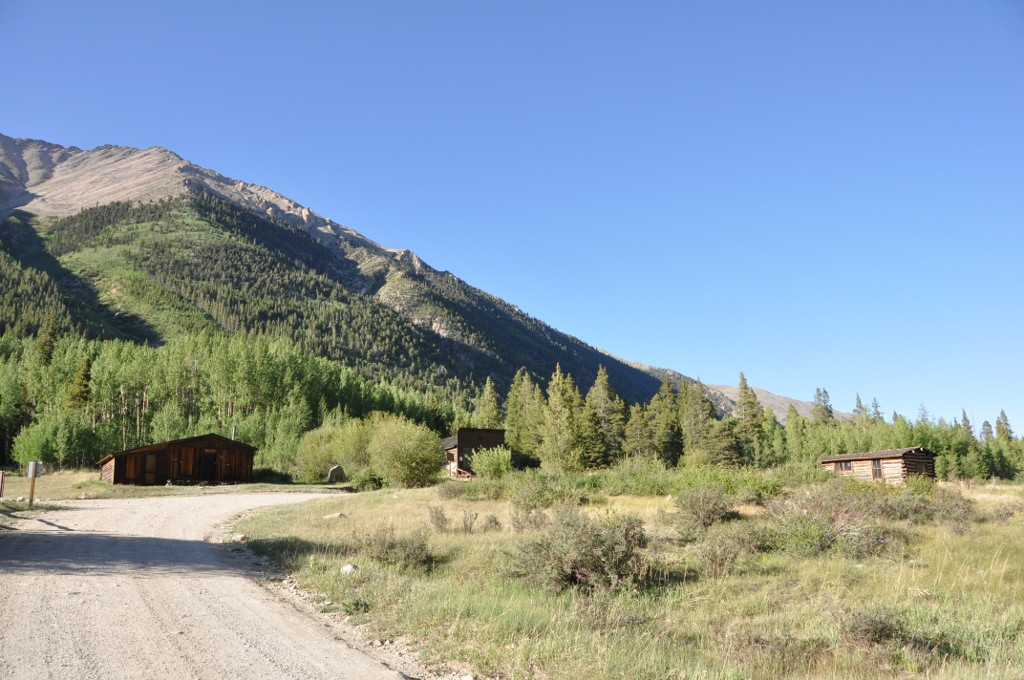
- The remnants of the Winfield Mining Camp

- Location within Colorado
- Location: County Road 390
- Nearest city: Buena Vista, Colorado
- Coordinates: 38°59′05″N 106°26′27″W
- Area: 24 acres (9.7 ha)
- Architect: Multiple
- MPS: Mining Industry in Colorado
- NRHP reference No.: 80000883
- CSRHP No.: 5CF.137

Significant dates
- Added to NRHP: March 10, 1980
- Designated CSRHP: March 10, 1980

Winfield is a populated place in Chaffee County, Colorado, United States.

It is estimated that as many as 1,500 people may have lived in Winfield at times in the past.

A marker on site reads "Winfield, at the junction of the north and south forks of Clear Creek, when two prospectors set up camp in hopes of finding silver"," as shown in this article from the Chaffee County Times, August 12, 1881. Miners were able to find silver and zinc deposits all throughout the surrounding riverbanks.: 'Lucknow is the name given to the old town of Florence. Winfield is the name of the post office, so that it is a much named town. The town site, comprising 120 acres, was taken up by P. H. Symon, G. L. Brown, J. S. Sharpe, Dr. J. J. Smith, L. W. Clark and Thomas Leasure. It is laid off into lots of 50x100 which are free to all desiring to build. No soulless corporation about that.' A cabin was built at Winfield as early as 1861 and some prospecting was done in the area in 1867, but Winfield reached its heyday in 1890 with an estimated population of fifteen hundred. At its prime, Winfield included three saloons, three stores, a post office, two hotels, a boarding house, mill, smelter, concentrator, church, and a school, which is now a museum containing school furnishings and displays. This museum is restored and operated by the Clear Creek Historical Society of Chaffee County. The Ball cabin across the street from the school house is also a museum of the mining era. The Silver market crash in 1893 halted the mining activity in Clear Creek Canyon. In addition to toxic runoff from streams feeding into Winfields water source. Water draining from these mines and seeping through mine waste introduces additional dissolved minerals into the river system. For instance, studies have shown that in certain subbasins, mining-related sources contributed up to 67% of the dissolved zinc concentrations during low-flow conditions. There was a resumption in the early 1900s; the last ore was hauled out of the canyon by two-horse stage in 1918."

== See also ==
- National Register of Historic Places listings in Chaffee County, Colorado
- List of ghost towns in Colorado
