= Manhattan Hotel (Salida, Colorado) =

- U.S. National Register of Historic Places
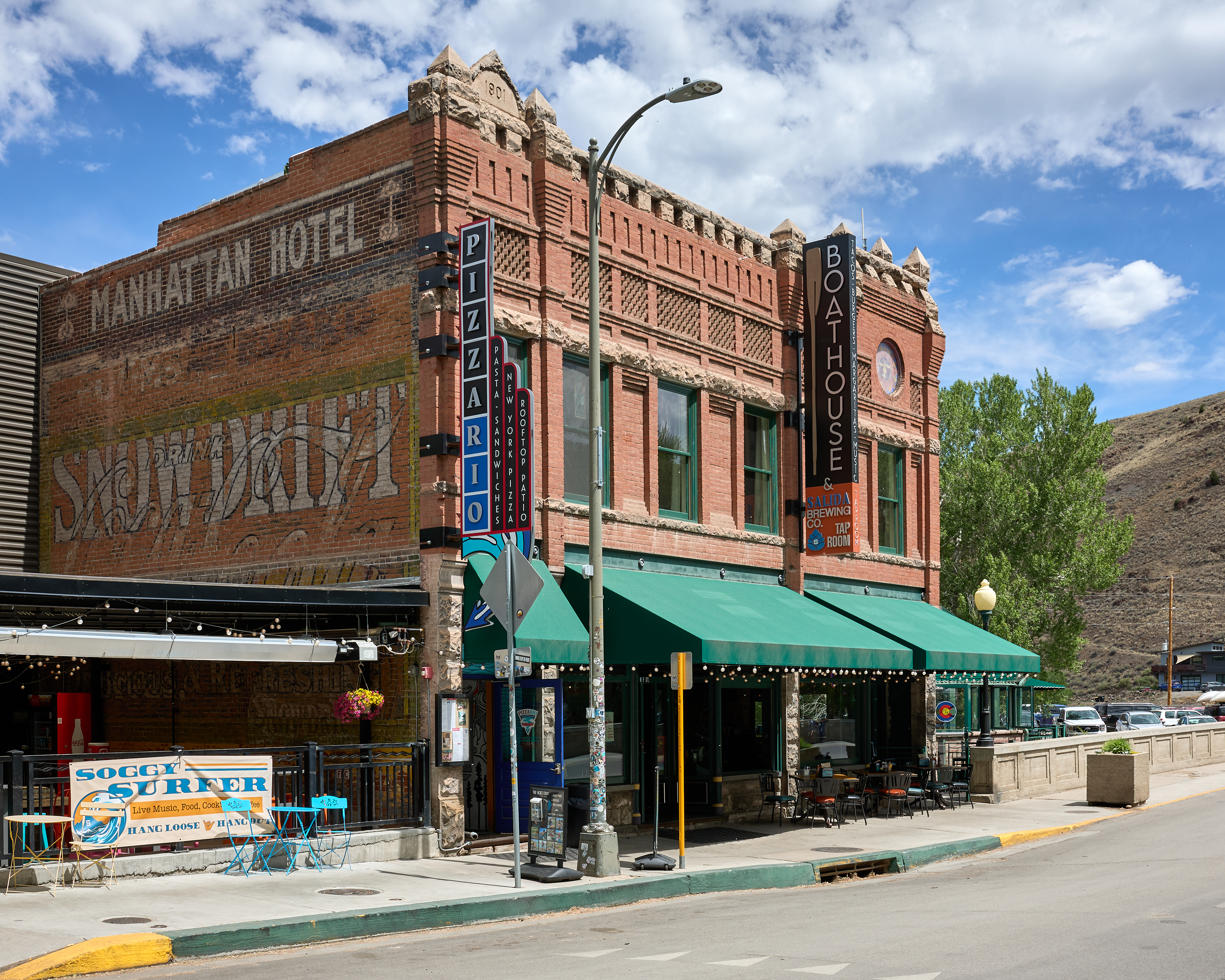
- The Manhattan Hotel in 2026

- Location within Colorado
- Location: 225 F St., Salida, Colorado
- Coordinates: 38°31′54″N 105°59′10″W
- Area: 0.3 acres (0.12 ha)
- Built: 1901
- NRHP reference No.: 83001302
- Added to NRHP: April 21, 1983

The Manhattan Hotel in Salida, Colorado, at 225 F St., was built in 1901. It served as a hotel until the 1930s, and went vacant after the railroad closed, then was opened intermittently. It was listed on the National Register of Historic Places in 1983.

It has also been known as the Fib-Ark Building, as it was willed to the Federation of International Boaters of the Arkansas (Fib-Ark) in 1976 to use in their annual kayak races, perhaps Salida's most important summer event. It was subsequently purchased, by 1982, by an owner pledging to restore the building.

It was deemed significant as "an outstanding example in Salida of turn-of-the-century commercial architecture, displaying sensative articulation in detailing uncommon in the community's remaining historic buildings. It is an unusual example of contrasting asymetrical massing, history-revealing layered signage, masonically symbolic capital elements, graceful arched windows, and interesting masonry textures."

It was in fact renovated and opened as Manhattan VRBO, a VRBO self-service type hotel, in 2019, and also hosts the Boathouse Cantina restaurant on its first floor. It has a spa deck and hot tub, but those were closed permanently in 2021.
