= Bode-Stewart House =

- Bode--Stewart House
- U.S. National Register of Historic Places
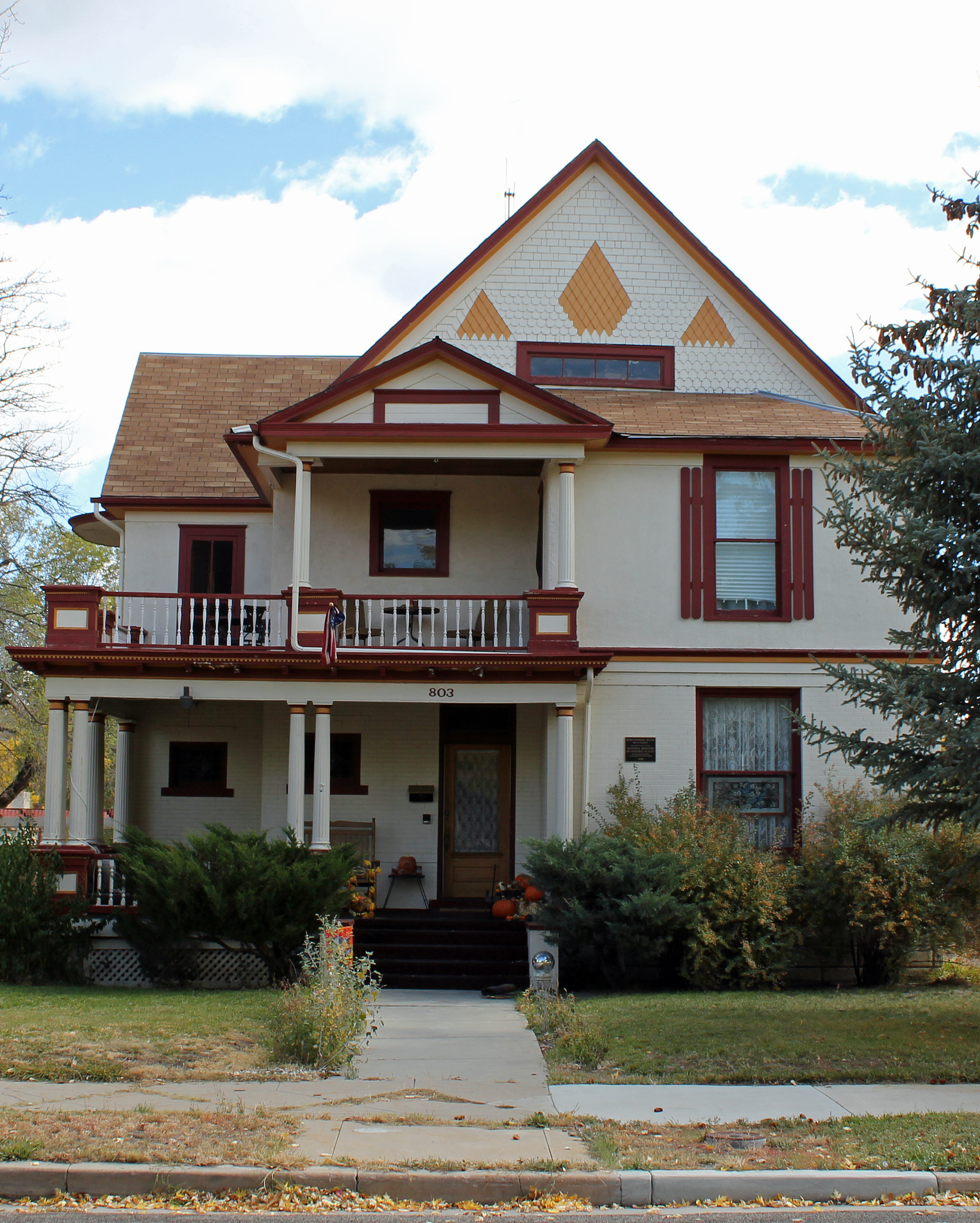

- Location within Colorado
- Location: 803 F St., Salida, Colorado
- Coordinates: 38°31′49″N 105°59′52″W
- Area: less than one acre
- Built: 1908
- Architectural style: Late Victorian
- NRHP reference No.: 08000344
- Added to NRHP: April 29, 2008

The Bode-Stewart House, at 803 F St. in Salida, Colorado, was built in 1908. It was listed on the National Register of Historic Places in 2008.

It is a two-story Edwardian-style, or Late Victorian-style, house.

A one-story brick garage built between 1914 and 1929 is a second contributing building on the property.
