= Nachtrieb-Kelly Ranch =

- U.S. National Register of Historic Places
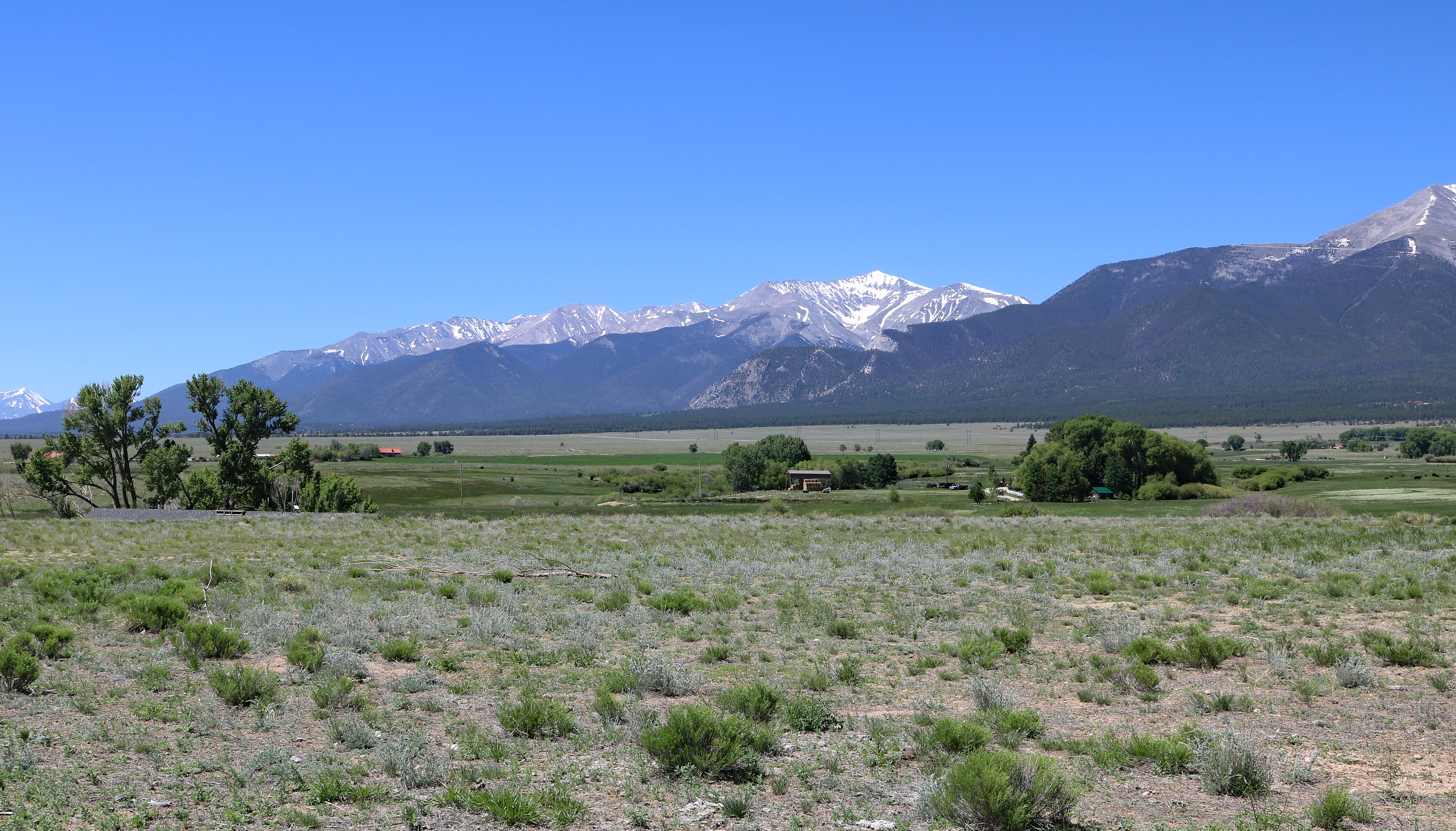
- The ranch viewed a point near the southern end of County Road 319. Some of the main ranch buildings are hidden by the clump of trees on the right

- Location within Colorado
- Location: 25887 County Road 319, Buena Vista, Colorado
- Coordinates: 38.794816°N 106.132497°W
- Area: 389 acres (157 ha)
- NRHP reference No.: 100000785
- Added to NRHP: March 27, 2017

The Nachtrieb-Kelly Ranch, also known as Maxwell Ranch, near Buena Vista, Colorado, was listed on the National Register of Historic Places in 2017.

It is a historic cattle and hay ranch with 24 identified resources, including three pioneer log buildings. It is located 3.2 miles (5.1 km) south-southwest of Buena Vista.

A 160 acres (65 ha) property on Maxwell Creek was homesteaded by Charles Nachtrieb in 1876. It was expanded to 640 acres (260 ha) by the early 1900s, and remained in the Nachtrieb family until 1936. The ranch has held grazing rights to a large area of adjacent public lands. After two other owners, it was acquired by the Kelly family in 1951, and a portion was eventually sold off, and the Kelly family continued to operate it in 2017.
