= E.W. Corbin House =

- U.S. National Register of Historic Places
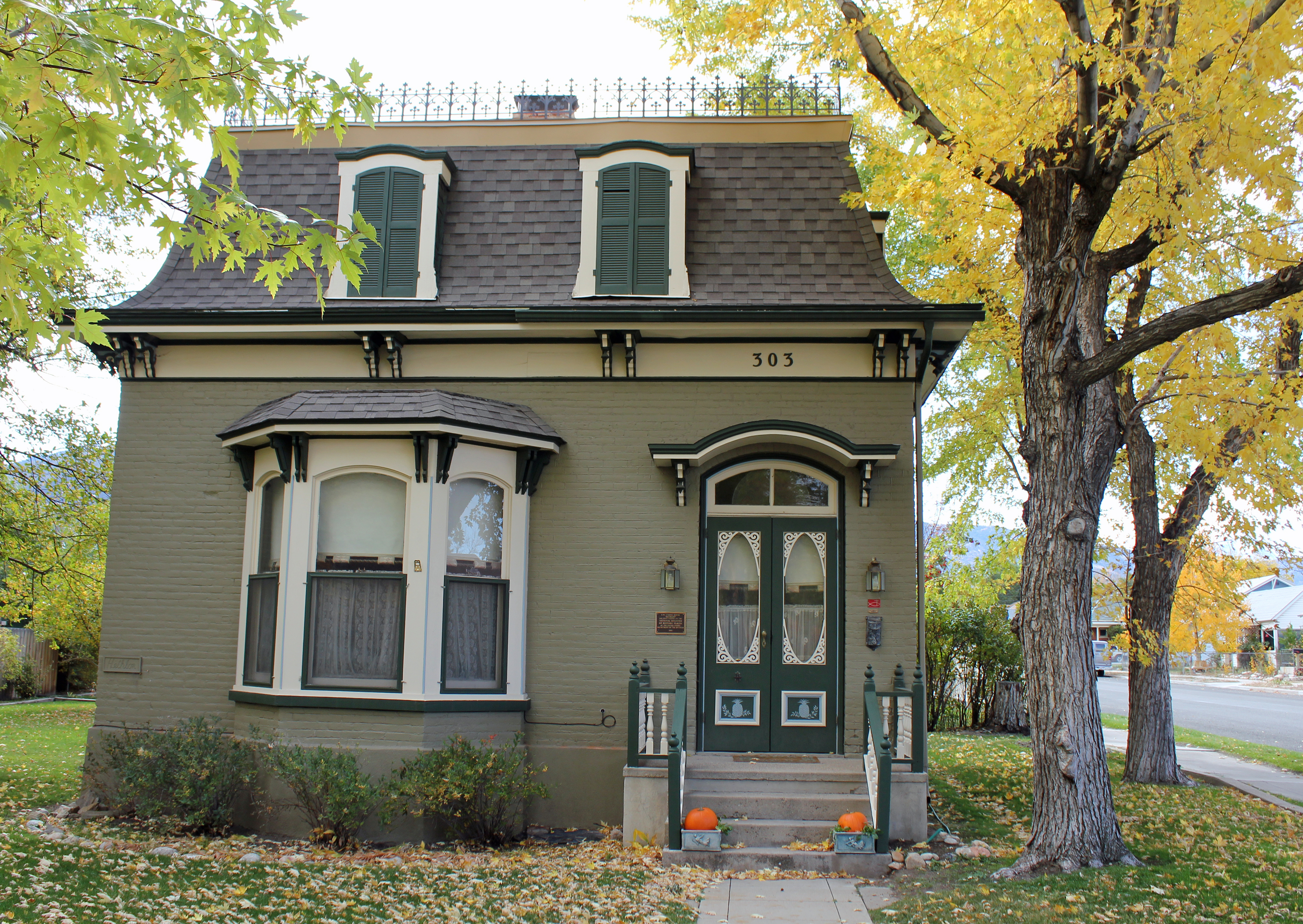

- Location within Colorado
- Location: 303 E. 5th St., Salida, Colorado
- Coordinates: 38°31′53″N 105°59′33″W
- Area: less than one acre
- Architectural style: Second Empire
- NRHP reference No.: 96001239
- Added to NRHP: November 1, 1996

The E.W. Corbin House, at 303 E. 5th St. in Salida, Colorado, was listed on the National Register of Historic Places in 1996.

It is a one-and-a-half-story painted brick house, Second Empire in style.
