= Maysville, Colorado =

Census-designated place in Chaffee County, CO, USA

- Census-designated place
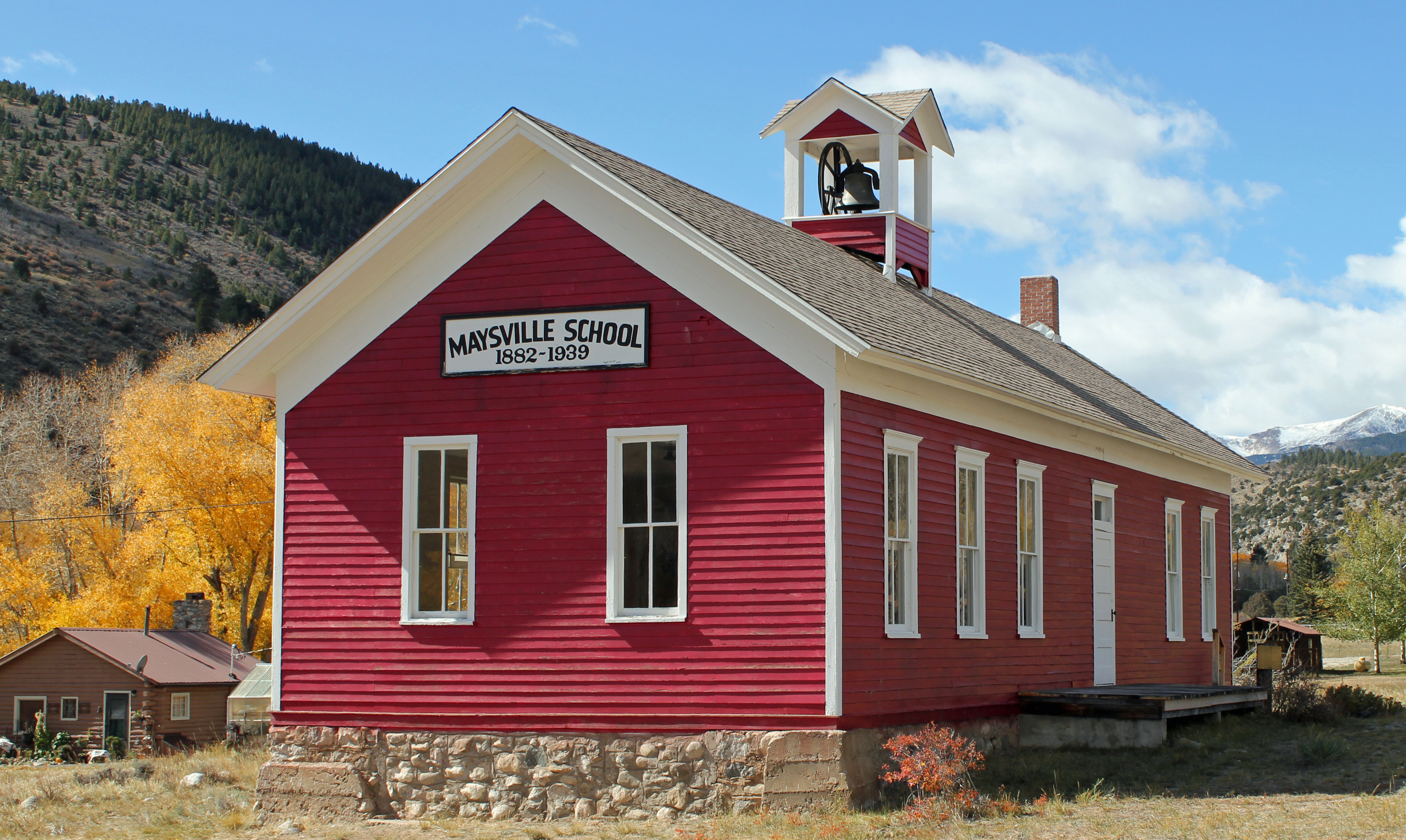
- The Maysville School in Maysville.

- Location of the Maysville CDP in Chaffee County, Colorado
- Coordinates: 38°31′35″N 106°14′30″W
- Country: United States
- State: Colorado
- County: Chaffee

Area
  - Total: 12.433 sq mi (32.201 km^{2})
  - Land: 12.420 sq mi (32.167 km^{2})
  - Water: 0.013 sq mi (0.034 km^{2})
- Elevation: 9,512 ft (2,899 m)

Population (2020)
  - Total: 173
  - Density: 13.9/sq mi (5.38/km^{2})
- Time zone: UTC-7 (MST)
  - Summer (DST): UTC-6 (MDT)
- ZIP Code: Salida 81201
- Area code: 719
- GNIS feature: 2583265

Maysville is an unincorporated community and a census-designated place (CDP) located in and governed by Chaffee County, Colorado, United States. The population of the Maysville CDP was 173 at the United States Census 2020. The Salida post office (Zip Code 81201) serves the area.

== Geography ==
The Maysville CDP has an area of 7,957 acres (32.201 km^{2}), including 8.4 acres (0.034 km^{2}) of water.

== Demographics ==
The United States Census Bureau initially defined the Maysville CDP for the United States Census 2010.

Maysville CDP, Colorado
Year	Pop.	±%
2010	135	—
2020	173	+28.1%
Source: United States Census Bureau

== See also ==
- Colorado census designated places
- Chaffee County, Colorado
