= Chaffee County, Colorado =

County in Colorado, United States

- county
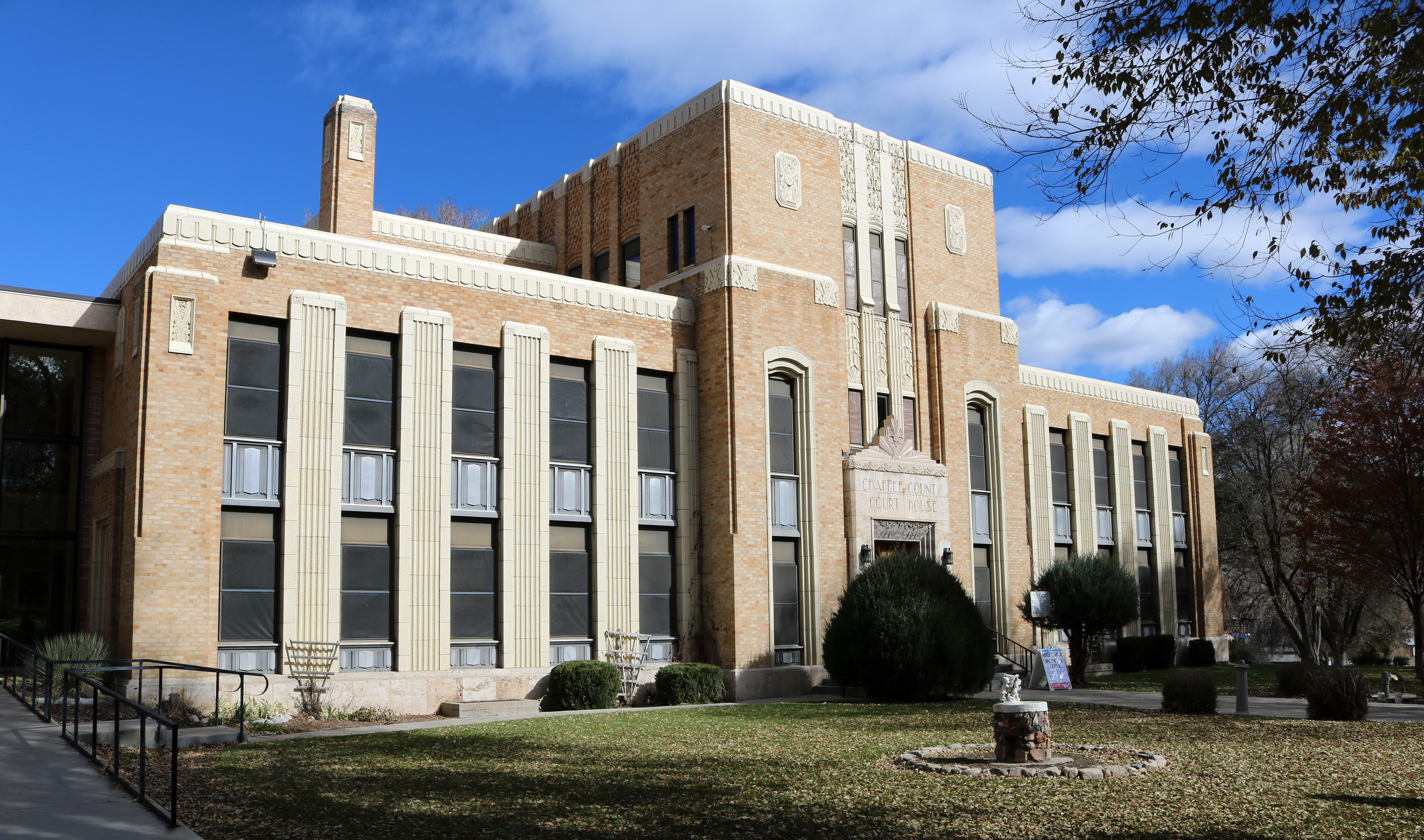
- Old Chaffee County Courthouse
- Nickname: Heart of the Rockies
- Location within the U.S. state of Colorado
- Coordinates: 38.74°N 106.18°W
- Country: United States
- State: Colorado
- Founded: February 10, 1879
- Named for: Jerome B. Chaffee
- Seat: Salida
- Largest City: Salida
- Other cities: Buena Vista; Poncha Springs

Area
  - Total: 1,014.95 sq mi (2,628.7 km^{2})
  - Land: 1,013.41 sq mi (2,624.7 km^{2})
  - Water: 1.54 sq mi (4.0 km^{2}) 0.15%

Population (2020)
  - Total: 19,476
  - Estimate (2025): 20,831 ▲
  - Density: 20.47/sq mi (7.90/km^{2})
- Time zone: UTC−7 (Mountain)
  - Summer (DST): UTC−6 (MDT)
- Area code: 719
- Congressional district: 7th
- Website: www.chaffeecounty.org

Chaffee County is a county located in the U.S. state of Colorado. As of the 2020 census, the population was 19,476. The county seat is Salida.

== History ==
Chaffee County has a confusing origin. Between February 8 and 10, 1879, Carbonate County was created by the Colorado legislature out of northern Lake County. On February 10 the two counties were renamed, with the southern part of Lake County becoming Chaffee County, and Carbonate County becoming Lake County. Chaffee County is known as the “Heart of the Rockies”. It was named for Jerome B. Chaffee, Colorado's first United States Senator.

== Geography ==
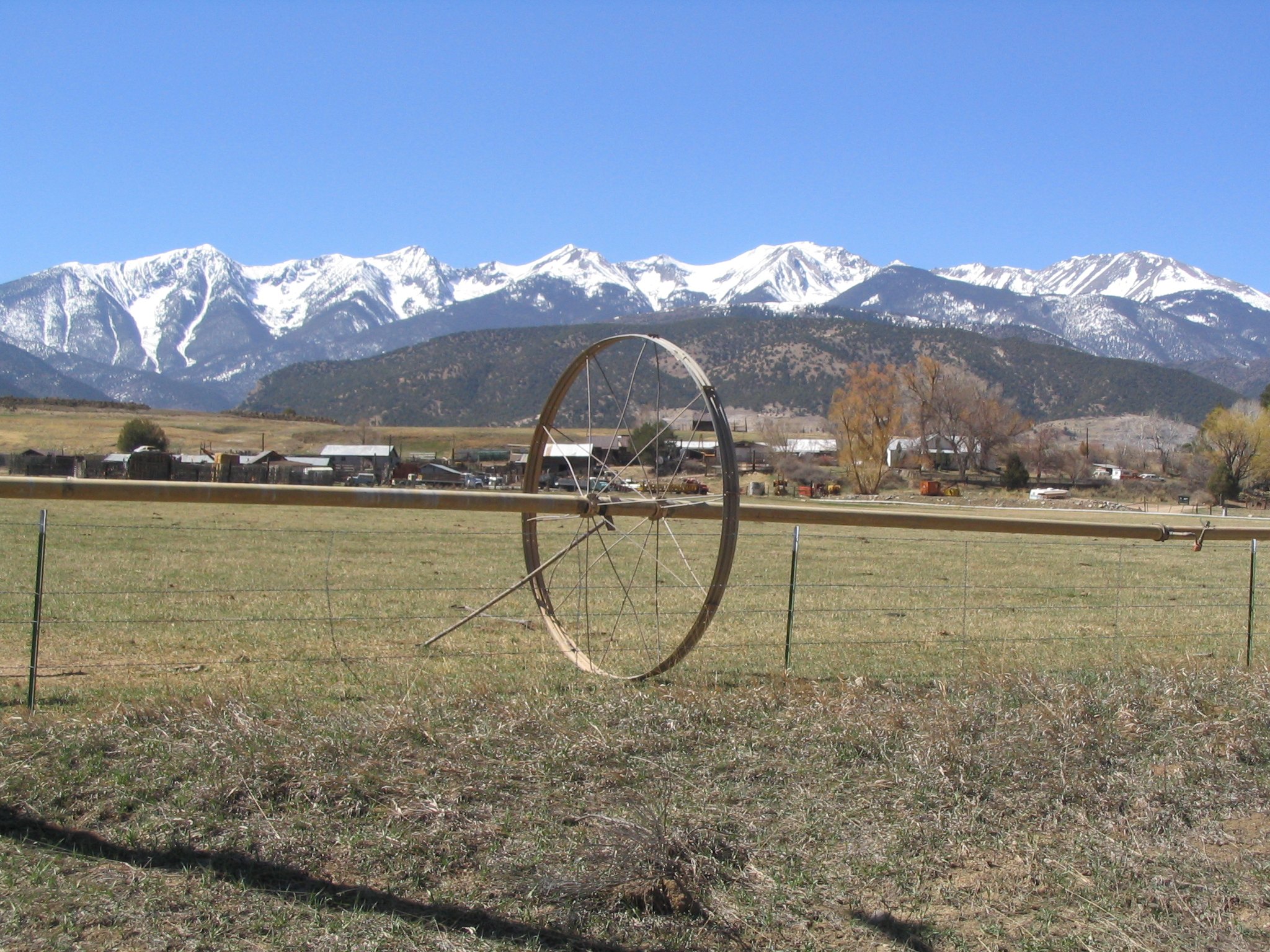
Salida, Colorado with Sangre de Cristo Range in background

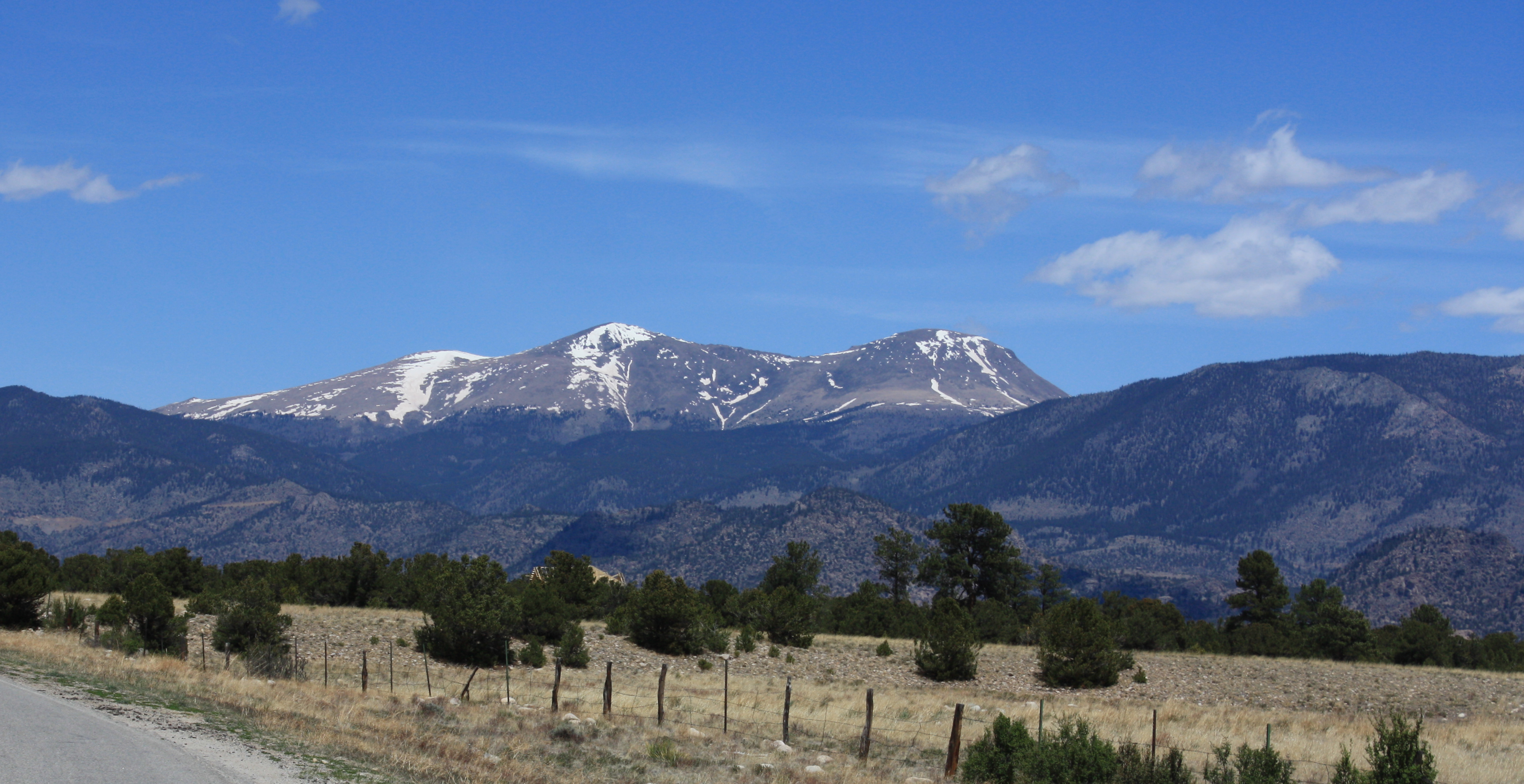
Buffalo Peaks near Buena Vista

According to the U.S. Census Bureau, the county has a total area of 1,014.95 square miles (2,628.7 km^{2}), of which 1,013.41 square miles (2,624.7 km^{2}) is land and 1.54 square miles (4.0 km^{2}) (0.15%) is water.

=== Adjacent counties ===
- Lake County - north
- Park County - northeast
- Fremont County - southeast
- Saguache County - south
- Gunnison County - west
- Pitkin County - northwest

=== Major highways ===
- U.S. Highway 24
- U.S. Highway 50
- U.S. Highway 285
- State Highway 291
- State Highway 306

=== National protected areas ===
- Browns Canyon National Monument
- Buffalo Peaks Wilderness
- Collegiate Peaks Wilderness
- San Isabel National Forest

=== Recreation area ===
- Arkansas Headwaters Recreation Area

=== Trails ===
- American Discovery Trail
- Colorado Trail
- Continental Divide National Scenic Trail

=== Bicycle routes ===
- Great Parks Bicycle Route
- Western Express Bicycle Route

== Demographics ==
Historical population
Census	Pop.	Note	%±
1880	6,512		—
1890	6,612		1.5%
1900	7,085		7.2%
1910	7,622		7.6%
1920	7,753		1.7%
1930	8,126		4.8%
1940	8,109		−0.2%
1950	7,168		−11.6%
1960	8,298		15.8%
1970	10,162		22.5%
1980	13,227		30.2%
1990	12,684		−4.1%
2000	16,242		28.1%
2010	17,809		9.6%
2020	19,476		9.4%
2025 (est.)	20,831	▲	7.0%
U.S. Decennial Census; 1790-1960 1900-1990; 1990-2000 2010-2020

=== 2020 census ===
As of the 2020 census, the county had a population of 19,476. Of the residents, 15.4% were under the age of 18 and 26.7% were 65 years of age or older; the median age was 49.3 years. For every 100 females there were 111.1 males, and for every 100 females age 18 and over there were 112.1 males. 56.4% of residents lived in urban areas and 43.6% lived in rural areas.

Chaffee County, Colorado – Racial and ethnic composition Note: the US Census treats Hispanic/Latino as an ethnic category. This table excludes Latinos from the racial categories and assigns them to a separate category. Hispanics/Latinos may be of any race.
Race / Ethnicity (NH = Non-Hispanic)	Pop 2000	Pop 2010	Pop 2020	% 2000	% 2010	% 2020
White alone (NH)	14,174	15,417	16,195	87.27%	86.57%	83.15%
Black or African American alone (NH)	257	267	295	1.58%	1.50%	1.51%
Native American or Alaska Native alone (NH)	151	143	132	0.93%	0.80%	0.68%
Asian alone (NH)	65	104	133	0.40%	0.58%	0.68%
Pacific Islander alone (NH)	3	8	11	0.02%	0.04%	0.06%
Other race alone (NH)	17	12	100	0.10%	0.07%	0.51%
Mixed race or Multiracial (NH)	182	180	769	1.12%	1.01%	3.95%
Hispanic or Latino (any race)	1,393	1,678	1,841	8.58%	9.42%	9.45%
Total	16,242	17,809	19,476	100.00%	100.00%	100.00%

The racial makeup of the county was 85.7% White, 1.5% Black or African American, 0.9% American Indian and Alaska Native, 0.7% Asian, 0.1% Native Hawaiian and Pacific Islander, 4.0% from some other race, and 7.0% from two or more races. Hispanic or Latino residents of any race comprised 9.5% of the population.

There were 8,411 households in the county, of which 20.6% had children under the age of 18 living with them and 23.4% had a female householder with no spouse or partner present. About 30.1% of all households were made up of individuals and 14.7% had someone living alone who was 65 years of age or older.

There were 10,921 housing units, of which 23.0% were vacant. Among occupied housing units, 73.9% were owner-occupied and 26.1% were renter-occupied. The homeowner vacancy rate was 1.5% and the rental vacancy rate was 9.2%.

=== 2000 census ===
At the 2000 census there were 16,242 people, 6,584 households, and 4,365 families living in the county. The population density was 16 people per square mile (6.2 people/km^{2}). There were 8,392 housing units at an average density of 8 per square mile (3.1/km^{2}). The racial makeup of the county was 90.94% White, 1.58% Black or African American, 1.09% Native American, 0.44% Asian, 0.05% Pacific Islander, 4.21% from other races, and 1.69% from two or more races. 8.58% of the population were Hispanic or Latino of any race. Of the 6,584 households 25.20% had children under the age of 18 living with them, 56.70% were married couples living together, 6.80% had a female householder with no husband present, and 33.70% were non-families. 28.40% of households were one person and 11.20% were one person aged 65 or older. The average household size was 2.26 and the average family size was 2.77.

The age distribution was 19.70% under the age of 18, 7.70% from 18 to 24, 28.00% from 25 to 44, 27.50% from 45 to 64, and 17.00% 65 or older. The median age was 42 years. For every 100 females, there were 113.60 males. For every 100 females age 18 and over, there were 116.20 males.

The median household income was $34,368 and the median family income was $42,043. Males had a median income of $30,770 versus $22,219 for females. The per capita income for the county was $19,430. About 7.40% of families and 11.70% of the population were below the poverty line, including 17.30% of those under age 18 and 10.20% of those age 65 or over.

Chaffee County is also home to a source of water that Arrowhead water uses for some water bottles. The source is Ruby Mountain Springs.

== Politics ==
Chaffee County was long a Republican stronghold, but has recently trended towards the Democrats. In 2008, Barack Obama lost the county by only 11 votes, and he carried it in 2012 by 16 votes, the first Democrat to win it since Lyndon Johnson's 1964 landslide. In 2016, Donald Trump flipped the county narrowly back into the Republican column, but Joe Biden won the county in 2020, the first candidate from either party to win the county by a full majority since 2004. Kamala Harris won the county by a larger margin in 2024, becoming the first Democratic presidential nominee to win the county while losing the presidential election since 1908.

United States presidential election results for Chaffee County, Colorado
Year	Republican		Democratic		Third party(ies)	
Year	No.	%	No.	%	No.	%
1880	1,135	48.50%	1,188	50.77%	17	0.73%
1884	1,142	53.46%	986	46.16%	8	0.37%
1888	1,277	56.21%	941	41.42%	54	2.38%
1892	678	40.12%	0	0.00%	1,012	59.88%
1896	141	5.10%	2,606	94.35%	15	0.54%
1900	1,033	34.41%	1,890	62.96%	79	2.63%
1904	1,611	46.90%	1,601	46.61%	223	6.49%
1908	1,233	38.23%	1,679	52.06%	313	9.71%
1912	723	21.30%	1,641	48.34%	1,031	30.37%
1916	864	24.59%	2,546	72.47%	103	2.93%
1920	1,501	52.91%	1,233	43.46%	103	3.63%
1924	1,336	43.40%	612	19.88%	1,130	36.71%
1928	1,880	59.49%	1,230	38.92%	50	1.58%
1932	1,061	29.24%	2,393	65.96%	174	4.80%
1936	1,069	29.18%	2,447	66.78%	148	4.04%
1940	1,933	46.91%	2,153	52.24%	35	0.85%
1944	1,675	48.83%	1,731	50.47%	24	0.70%
1948	2,065	57.68%	1,476	41.23%	39	1.09%
1952	2,171	56.70%	1,643	42.91%	15	0.39%
1956	2,284	63.67%	1,303	36.33%	0	0.00%
1960	2,094	52.14%	1,918	47.76%	4	0.10%
1964	1,476	37.36%	2,463	62.34%	12	0.30%
1968	2,121	51.07%	1,667	40.14%	365	8.79%
1972	2,859	66.63%	1,354	31.55%	78	1.82%
1976	2,925	56.66%	2,064	39.98%	173	3.35%
1980	3,327	60.73%	1,583	28.90%	568	10.37%
1984	3,680	66.31%	1,779	32.05%	91	1.64%
1988	3,080	53.90%	2,548	44.59%	86	1.51%
1992	2,419	38.51%	2,284	36.36%	1,579	25.14%
1996	3,052	46.85%	2,768	42.49%	695	10.67%
2000	4,300	56.50%	2,768	36.37%	542	7.12%
2004	4,875	55.59%	3,766	42.94%	129	1.47%
2008	4,873	49.12%	4,862	49.01%	186	1.87%
2012	5,070	48.46%	5,086	48.61%	306	2.92%
2016	5,391	47.92%	4,888	43.45%	971	8.63%
2020	6,222	45.36%	7,160	52.19%	336	2.45%
2024	6,034	41.84%	7,992	55.41%	397	2.75%

United States Senate election results for Chaffee County, Colorado2
Year	Republican		Democratic		Third party(ies)	
Year	No.	%	No.	%	No.	%
2020	6,344	46.72%	6,948	51.17%	286	2.11%

United States Senate election results for Chaffee County, Colorado3
Year	Republican		Democratic		Third party(ies)	
Year	No.	%	No.	%	No.	%
2022	4,854	41.14%	6,607	55.99%	339	2.87%

Colorado Gubernatorial election results for Chaffee County
Year	Republican		Democratic		Third party(ies)	
Year	No.	%	No.	%	No.	%
2022	4,646	39.54%	6,807	57.94%	296	2.52%

== Communities ==
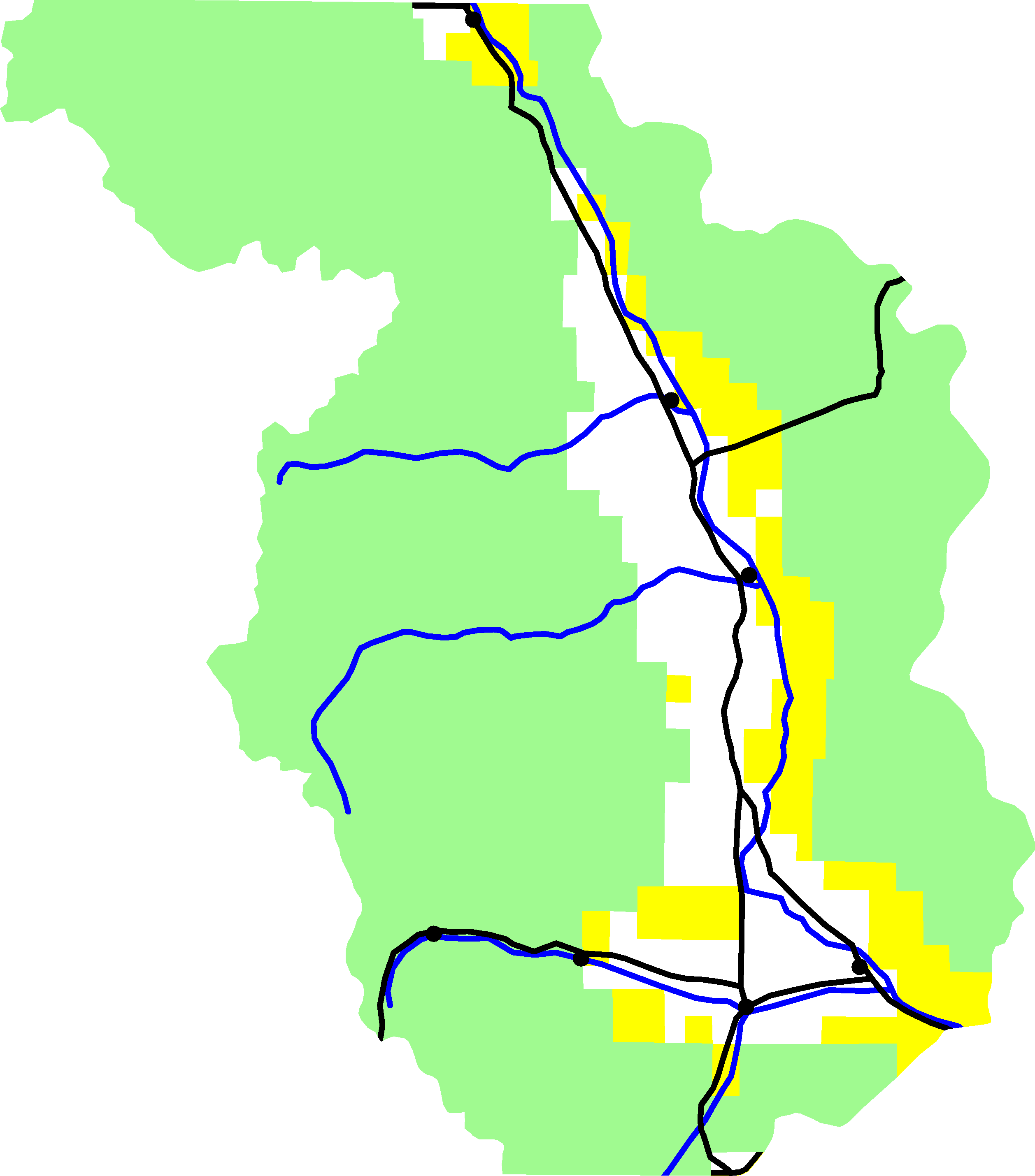
Chaffee County, Colorado

=== City ===
- Salida

=== Towns ===
- Buena Vista
- Poncha Springs

=== Census-designated places ===
- Garfield
- Johnson Village
- Maysville
- Nathrop
- Smeltertown

=== Unincorporated communities ===
- Alpine
- Belleview
- Browns Canon
- Centerville
- Cleora
- Futurity
- Granite
- Hamilton
- Newett
- Princeton
- Riverside
- Rockdale
- St. Elmo
- Stonewall
- Turret

=== Ghost towns ===
- St. Elmo
- Vicksburg
- Winfield

== See also ==
- Bibliography of Colorado
- Geography of Colorado
- History of Colorado
  - National Register of Historic Places listings in Chaffee County, Colorado
- Index of Colorado-related articles
- List of Colorado-related lists
  - List of counties in Colorado
- Outline of Colorado
