= Buena Vista, Colorado =

Statutory town in Chaffee County, Colorado, United States

- Statutory town
- Town of Buena Vista
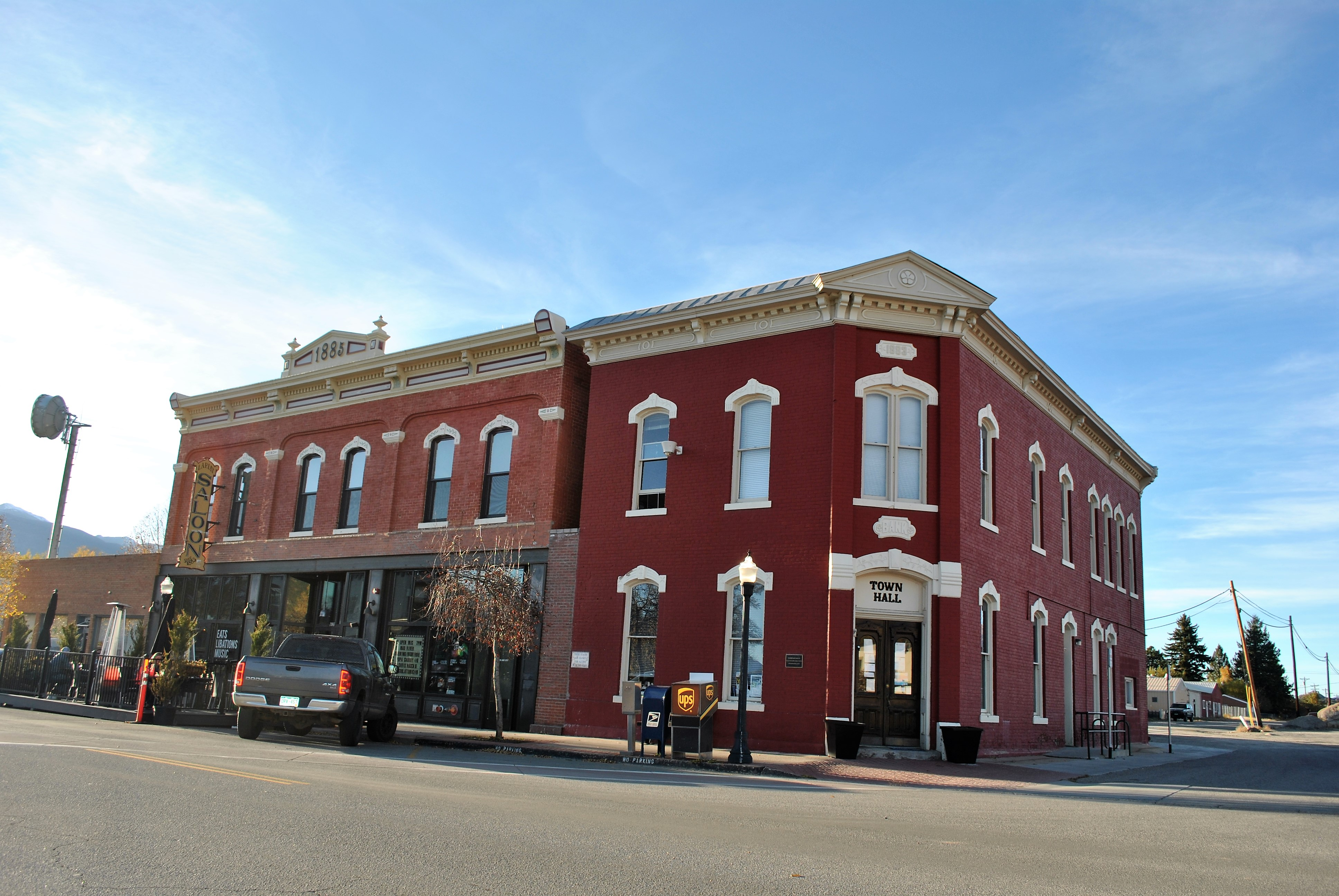
- Town Hall
- Motto: "8,000 Feet Above Average"
- Location of the Town of Buena Vista in Chaffee County, Colorado
- Coordinates: 38°50′05″N 106°07′36″W
- Country: United States
- State: Colorado
- County: Chaffee
- Incorporated: November 8, 1879

Government
  - Type: Statutory town

Area
  - Total: 3.453 sq mi (8.942 km^{2})
  - Land: 3.453 sq mi (8.942 km^{2})
  - Water: 0 sq mi (0.000 km^{2})
- Elevation: 7,960 ft (2,430 m)

Population (2020)
  - Total: 2,855
  - Density: 827/sq mi (319/km^{2})
- Time zone: UTC−07:00 (MST)
  - Summer (DST): UTC−06:00 (MDT)
- ZIP code: 81211
- Area code: 719
- GNIS town ID: 2411739
- FIPS code: 10105
- Website: www.buenavistaco.gov

Buena Vista (/ˌbjuːnə ˈvɪstə/ BEW-nə VIST-ə) is a statutory town located in Chaffee County, Colorado, United States. The town population was 2,855 at the 2020 United States census.

Buena Vista is located in central Colorado roughly midway between Salida and Leadville in the Upper Arkansas River Valley at an elevation of 7,965 feet (2,428 m).

The name "Buena Vista", Spanish for "Good View", can often be heard pronounced locally as /ˈbjuːnə ˈvɪstə/. This Americanized pronunciation was specified by Alsina Dearheimer, who chose this name for the town, which was officially selected over other names (Cottonwood, Mahonville) on the occasion of the town's incorporation. Alternate pronunciations include the Spanish [ˈbwena ˈβista] and simply /ˈbjuːni/. Many residents simply refer to the town as "BV."

== History ==
The Arkansas River Valley and the area of what would become Buena Vista was first settled in 1864 by settlers drawn to the area by the plentiful water which made the land suitable for agriculture. The Buena Vista, Colorado, post office opened on September 18, 1879.

In 1888, Chaffee County voters moved the county seat from Granite to Buena Vista. Voters subsequently moved the county seat to Salida, which then had a larger population, in 1928.

Buena Vista incorporated in 1879 and grew as a railroad town serving the local silver, gold, and lead mining industry, with three rail lines including Denver & Rio Grande, South Park & Pacific, and Colorado Midland railroads. Many of the existing buildings of Buena Vista date back to this era, and were built in the 1880s and 1890s.

By 1894, Buena Vista had electricity, telephone service, street lights, parks, cemeteries, and schools. Travelers, speculators, and miners traveling up the Arkansas Valley towards Leadville made Buena Vista a popular stagecoach stop, and railroad depot following the 1890s. While certainly experiencing economic ups and downs, the valley's agricultural economy has made the area more resistant to the 'boom, bust' cycle of mining towns.

== Present day economy ==
In summer, Buena Vista is a popular access point for world-class whitewater rafting, kayaking, and fly fishing on the Arkansas River, and mountain climbing and backpacking on local 14ers and the Colorado Trail.

In winter, sizable elk and deer herds attract hunters. Bighorn sheep, mountain goats, and antelope are also indigenous to the area.

== Geography ==
Buena Vista is located in the Upper Arkansas River Valley.

The town lies at the base of the 14,000+ peaks of the Collegiate Peaks, Mt. Princeton, Mt. Yale, Mt. Columbia, and Mt. Harvard, of the Sawatch Range.

At the 2020 United States census, the town had a total area of 2,210 acres (8.942 km^{2}), all of it land.

=== Climate ===
Buena Vista has a Semi-arid climate (Köppen climate classification BSk), with cold, dry winters and warm, somewhat wetter summers. Altitude and dryness cause the diurnal temperature variation to be high year-round.

The area between Buena Vista and Salida is often referred to as the "Banana Belt", due to its relatively mild winters. The term "Banana Belt" actually refers to the fact that Buena Vista lies in a wide valley and is a high mountain desert with milder temperatures than nearby communities such as those on the I-70 corridor.

Climate data for Buena Vista, Colorado (1991–2020 normals, extremes 1905–present)
Month	Jan	Feb	Mar	Apr	May	Jun	Jul	Aug	Sep	Oct	Nov	Dec	Year
Record high °F (°C)	71 (22)	68 (20)	73 (23)	89 (32)	92 (33)	105 (41)	102 (39)	94 (34)	96 (36)	86 (30)	80 (27)	69 (21)	105 (41)
Mean maximum °F (°C)	54.4 (12.4)	55.5 (13.1)	64.5 (18.1)	70.9 (21.6)	79.7 (26.5)	88.5 (31.4)	91.2 (32.9)	87.5 (30.8)	83.6 (28.7)	76.1 (24.5)	63.8 (17.7)	54.9 (12.7)	91.6 (33.1)
Mean daily maximum °F (°C)	40.6 (4.8)	42.6 (5.9)	50.4 (10.2)	56.5 (13.6)	66.5 (19.2)	78.4 (25.8)	83.2 (28.4)	80.2 (26.8)	74.0 (23.3)	62.3 (16.8)	49.7 (9.8)	40.1 (4.5)	60.4 (15.8)
Daily mean °F (°C)	25.8 (−3.4)	28.1 (−2.2)	35.8 (2.1)	41.6 (5.3)	51.1 (10.6)	60.9 (16.1)	66.2 (19.0)	63.7 (17.6)	56.8 (13.8)	45.6 (7.6)	34.6 (1.4)	25.7 (−3.5)	44.7 (7.1)
Mean daily minimum °F (°C)	11.1 (−11.6)	13.6 (−10.2)	21.2 (−6.0)	26.6 (−3.0)	35.7 (2.1)	43.4 (6.3)	49.2 (9.6)	47.2 (8.4)	39.6 (4.2)	28.9 (−1.7)	19.5 (−6.9)	11.3 (−11.5)	28.9 (−1.7)
Mean minimum °F (°C)	−7.0 (−21.7)	−5.4 (−20.8)	5.4 (−14.8)	12.6 (−10.8)	22.3 (−5.4)	33.4 (0.8)	41.7 (5.4)	39.6 (4.2)	28.0 (−2.2)	13.5 (−10.3)	0.6 (−17.4)	−7.4 (−21.9)	−13.1 (−25.1)
Record low °F (°C)	−37 (−38)	−31 (−35)	−24 (−31)	−9 (−23)	6 (−14)	20 (−7)	25 (−4)	25 (−4)	15 (−9)	−6 (−21)	−23 (−31)	−31 (−35)	−37 (−38)
Average precipitation inches (mm)	0.33 (8.4)	0.44 (11)	0.62 (16)	1.02 (26)	1.17 (30)	0.70 (18)	1.51 (38)	1.57 (40)	0.90 (23)	0.80 (20)	0.44 (11)	0.43 (11)	9.93 (252)
Average snowfall inches (cm)	6.2 (16)	7.4 (19)	8.2 (21)	8.1 (21)	3.2 (8.1)	0.0 (0.0)	0.0 (0.0)	0.0 (0.0)	0.4 (1.0)	3.1 (7.9)	5.1 (13)	7.6 (19)	49.3 (125)
Average precipitation days (≥ 0.01 in)	3.8	5.4	5.7	6.6	7.3	6.7	12.6	12.3	8.0	6.0	4.5	4.8	83.7
Average snowy days (≥ 0.1 in)	3.8	5.3	4.4	4.0	1.6	0.0	0.0	0.0	0.1	1.8	3.7	5.2	29.9
Source: NOAA

== Demographics ==
Historical population
Census	Pop.	Note	%±
1880	2,141		—
1900	1,006		—
1910	1,041		3.5%
1920	903		−13.3%
1930	751		−16.8%
1940	779		3.7%
1950	783		0.5%
1960	1,806		130.7%
1970	1,962		8.6%
1980	2,075		5.8%
1990	1,752		−15.6%
2000	2,195		25.3%
2010	2,617		19.2%
2020	2,855		9.1%
U.S. Decennial Census

=== 2020 census ===
As of the 2020 census, Buena Vista had a population of 2,855. The median age was 41.6 years. 19.9% of residents were under the age of 18 and 20.7% of residents were 65 years of age or older. For every 100 females there were 93.4 males, and for every 100 females age 18 and over there were 91.0 males age 18 and over.

100.0% of residents lived in urban areas, while 0.0% lived in rural areas.

There were 1,276 households in Buena Vista, of which 26.0% had children under the age of 18 living in them. Of all households, 46.4% were married-couple households, 19.1% were households with a male householder and no spouse or partner present, and 28.4% were households with a female householder and no spouse or partner present. About 32.1% of all households were made up of individuals and 14.1% had someone living alone who was 65 years of age or older.

There were 1,571 housing units, of which 18.8% were vacant. The homeowner vacancy rate was 2.3% and the rental vacancy rate was 12.3%.

Racial composition as of the 2020 census
Race	Number	Percent
White	2,497	87.5%
Black or African American	18	0.6%
American Indian and Alaska Native	22	0.8%
Asian	29	1.0%
Native Hawaiian and Other Pacific Islander	1	0.0%
Some other race	52	1.8%
Two or more races	236	8.3%
Hispanic or Latino (of any race)	206	7.2%

=== 2000 census ===
As of the census of 2000, there were 2,195 people, 978 households, and 622 families residing in the town. The population density was 638.6 inhabitants per square mile (246.6/km^{2}). There were 1,124 housing units at an average density of 327.0 per square mile (126.3/km^{2}). The racial makeup of the town was 96.81% Caucasian, 0.09% African American, 0.64% Native American, 0.27% Asian, 0.73% from other races, and 1.46% from two or more races. Hispanic or Latino of any race were 4.74% of the population.

There were 978 households, out of which 27.1% had children under the age of 18 living with them, 54.2% were married couples living together, 7.7% had a female householder with no husband present, and 36.3% were non-families. 31.0% of all households were made up of individuals, and 12.8% had someone living alone who was 65 years of age or older. The average household size was 2.24 and the average family size was 2.83.

In the town, the population was spread out, with 23.6% under the age of 18, 5.1% from 18 to 24, 26.7% from 25 to 44, 27.8% from 45 to 64, and 16.7% who were 65 years of age or older. The median age was 42 years. For every 100 females, there were 92.4 males. For every 100 females age 18 and over, there were 85.8 males.

The median income for a household in the town was $34,800, and the median income for a family was $40,455. Males had a median income of $32,841 versus $25,486 for females. The per capita income for the town was $16,920. About 9.4% of families and 11.7% of the population were below the poverty line, including 19.1% of those under age 18 and 5.7% of those age 65 or over.

== Transportation ==
U.S. Route 24 is an east–west highway running from Clarkston, Michigan, to its intersection with Interstate 70 near Minturn, Colorado. Its western terminus is located just 64 miles (103 km) north of Buena Vista.

The short segment between US 50 at Poncha Springs and US 24 at Buena Vista was originally U.S. Route 650, designated in 1926. US 285 was commissioned in 1936 along its present extent from Sanderson, Texas, to Denver, mostly replacing state-numbered highways.

Chaffee County Road 306 leaves Buena Vista and travels west to the summit of Cottonwood Pass (elevation 12,126 feet (3,696 meters)). This road is closed during the snowy months, typically late October to April or May, but when open allows travelers a more direct route to Gunnison and Crested Butte than US 50 crossing Monarch Pass to the south of town.

Buena Vista is part of Colorado's Bustang network. It is on the Gunnison-Denver Outrider line.

== Notable people ==
- Christine Arguello (born 1955), federal judge
- Trace Bundy, acoustic guitar player
- Austin Carlile, vocalist, Of Mice and Men
- Mason Finley, American shot putter and discus thrower
- Matt Hemingway, American track and field athlete
- Curtis Imrie, pack burro racer
- Nate Solder, tackle, New York Giants

== See also ==
- Cottonwood Pass
- Mount Princeton
