= Turner Peak =

Mountain in the state of Colorado

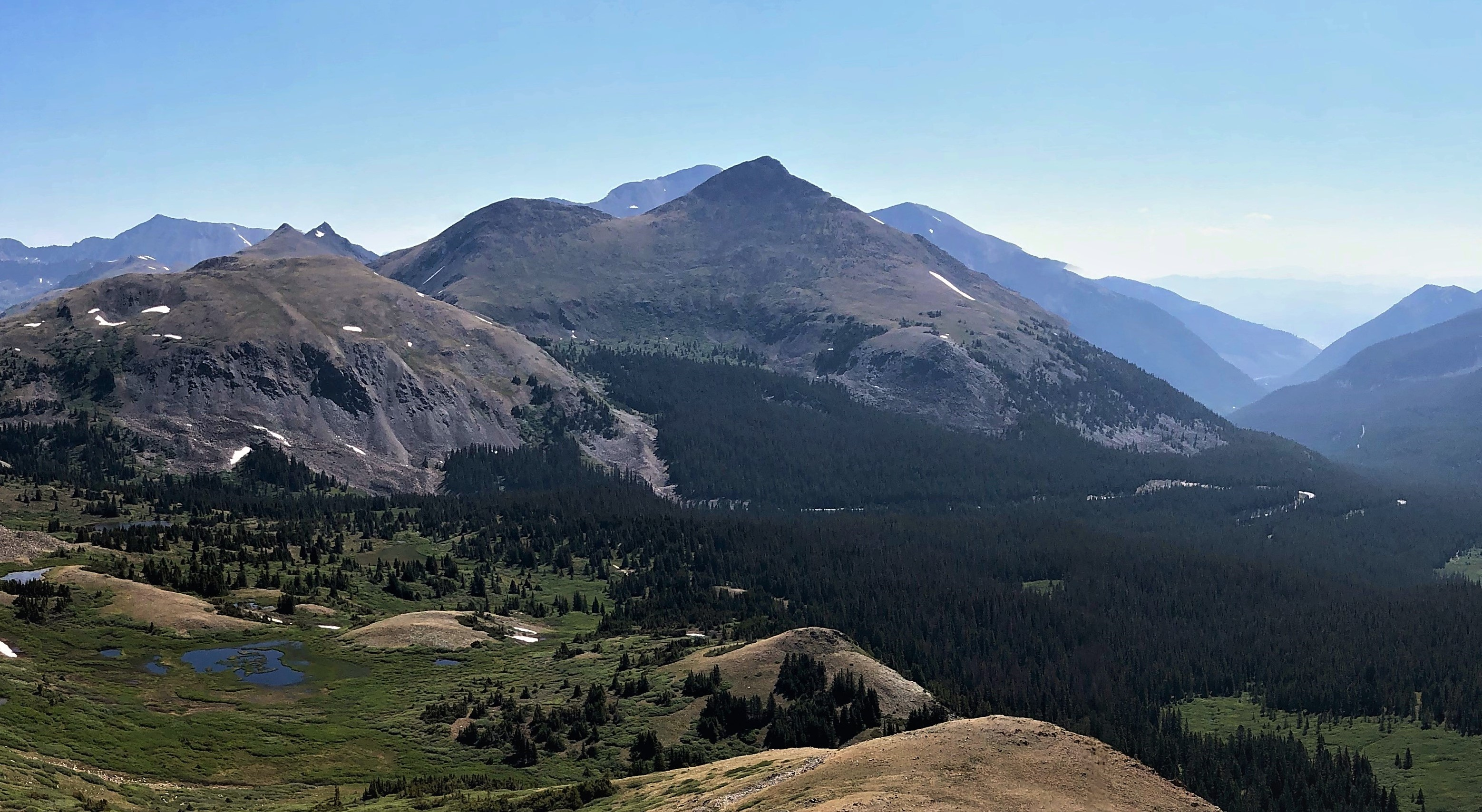
- Southwest aspect

Highest point
- Elevation: 13,233 ft (4,033 m)
- Prominence: 1,157 ft (353 m)
- Parent peak: Mount Princeton (14,204 ft)
- Isolation: 3.88 mi (6.24 km)
- Coordinates: 38°49′11″N 106°22′43″W

Naming
- Etymology: William E. Turner

Geography
- Location within Colorado Location within the United States
- Country: United States
- State: Colorado
- County: Chaffee County
- Protected area: Collegiate Peaks Wilderness
- Parent range: Rocky Mountains; Sawatch Range; Collegiate Peaks
- Topo map: USGS Tincup

Climbing
- Easiest route: class 2 hiking

Turner Peak is a 13,233-foot-elevation (4,033-meter) mountain summit in Chaffee County, Colorado, United States.

== Description ==
Turner Peak is set 0.4 miles (0.64 km) east of the Continental Divide in the Collegiate Peaks which are a subrange of the Sawatch Range. The peak is located 13.3 miles (21.4 km) west of the community of Buena Vista in the Collegiate Peaks Wilderness, on land managed by San Isabel National Forest. Precipitation runoff from the mountain's slopes drains into tributaries of Cottonwood Creek which in turn is a tributary of the Arkansas River. Topographic relief is significant as the summit rises over 2,400 feet (732 m) above the creek's middle fork in 1.2 miles (1.9 km). Chaffee County Road 306 traverses the southern base of this mountain near Cottonwood Pass. The mountain's toponym was officially adopted in 1976 by the United States Board on Geographic Names to remember William E. Turner (?–1976), pioneer resident and historian who once cut timber at the base of this mountain.

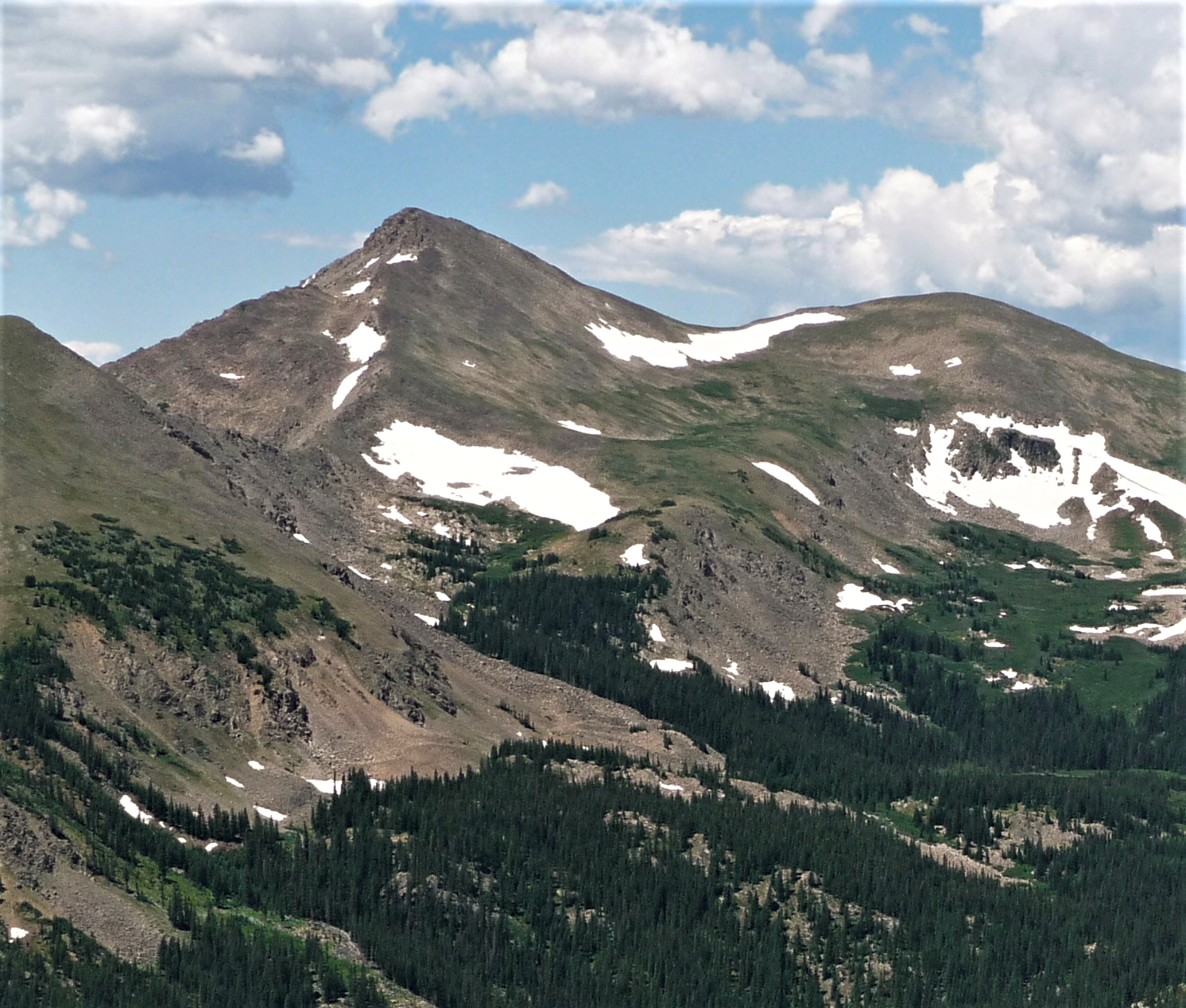
Northeast aspect

== Climate ==
According to the Köppen climate classification system, Turner Peak is located in an alpine subarctic climate zone with cold, snowy winters, and cool to warm summers. Due to its altitude, it receives precipitation all year, as snow in winter and as thunderstorms in summer, with a dry period in late spring. Climbers can expect afternoon rain, hail, and lightning from the seasonal monsoon in late July and August.

== See also ==
- Jones Mountain (Chaffee County, Colorado)
- Thirteener
