= Ice Mountain (Colorado) =

Mountain in Colorado, United States

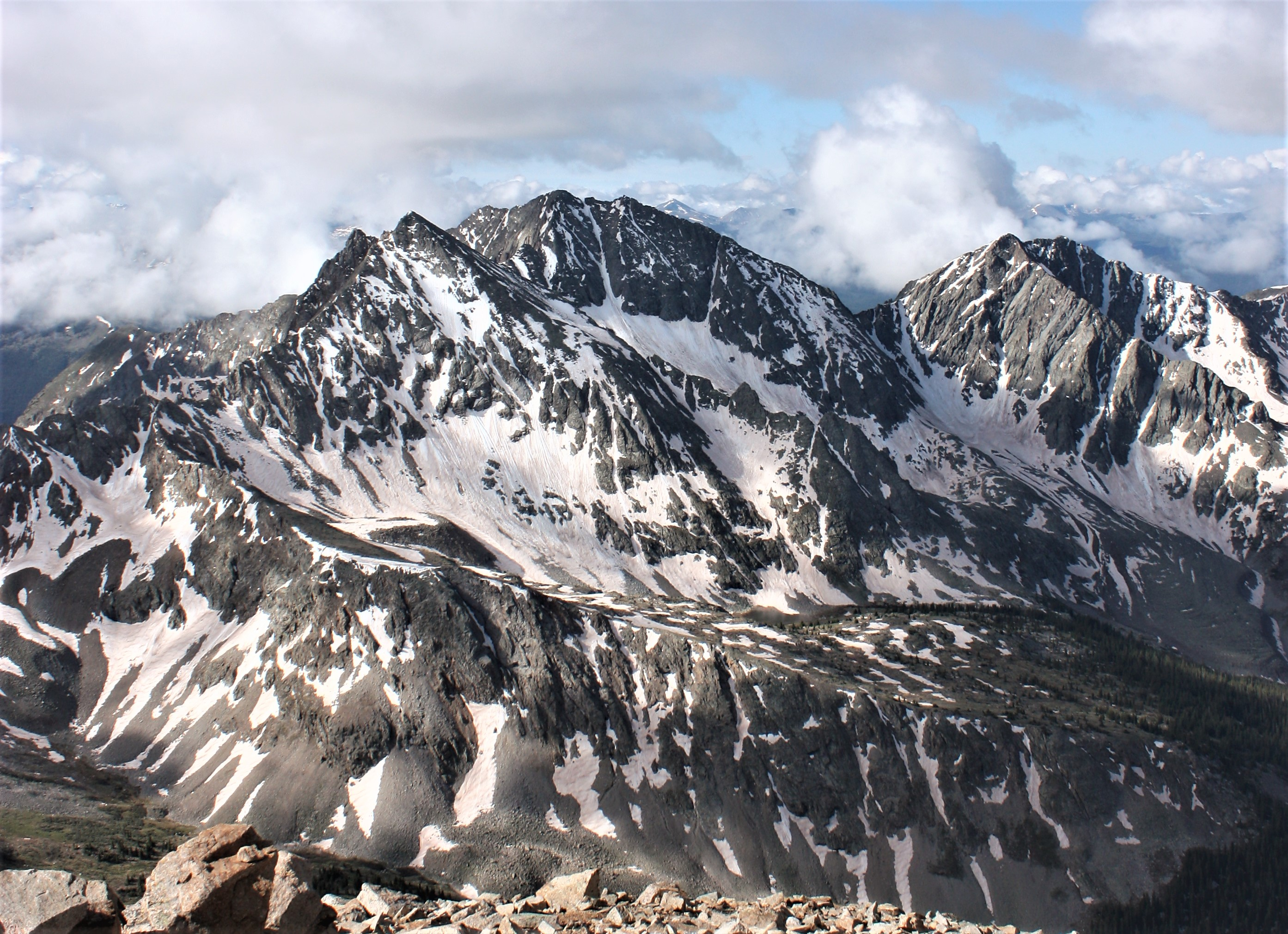
- North aspect of Ice Mountain (center)

Highest point
- Elevation: 13,958 ft (4,254 m)
- Prominence: 1,011 ft (308 m)
- Parent peak: Huron Peak
- Isolation: 2.11 mi (3.40 km)
- Coordinates: 38°54′52″N 106°26′14″W

Geography
- Location within Colorado
- Location: Chaffee and Gunnison counties, Colorado, United States
- Parent range: Sawatch Range, Collegiate Peaks
- Topo map(s): USGS 7.5' topographic map Winfield, Colorado

Ice Mountain is a high mountain summit of the Collegiate Peaks in the Sawatch Range of the Rocky Mountains of North America. The 13,958-foot (4,254 m) thirteener is located in the Collegiate Peaks Wilderness, 17.1 miles (27.5 km) west-northwest (bearing 290°) of the Town of Buena Vista, Colorado, United States, on the Continental Divide separating San Isabel National Forest and Chaffee County from White River National Forest and Pitkin County.

== Climate ==
According to the Köppen climate classification system, Ice Mountain is located in an alpine subarctic climate zone with cold, snowy winters, and cool to warm summers. Due to its altitude, it receives precipitation all year, as snow in winter, and as thunderstorms in summer, with a dry period in late spring.

== See also ==
- List of Colorado mountain ranges
- List of Colorado mountain summits
  - List of Colorado fourteeners
  - List of Colorado 4000 meter prominent summits
  - List of the most prominent summits of Colorado
- List of Colorado county high points

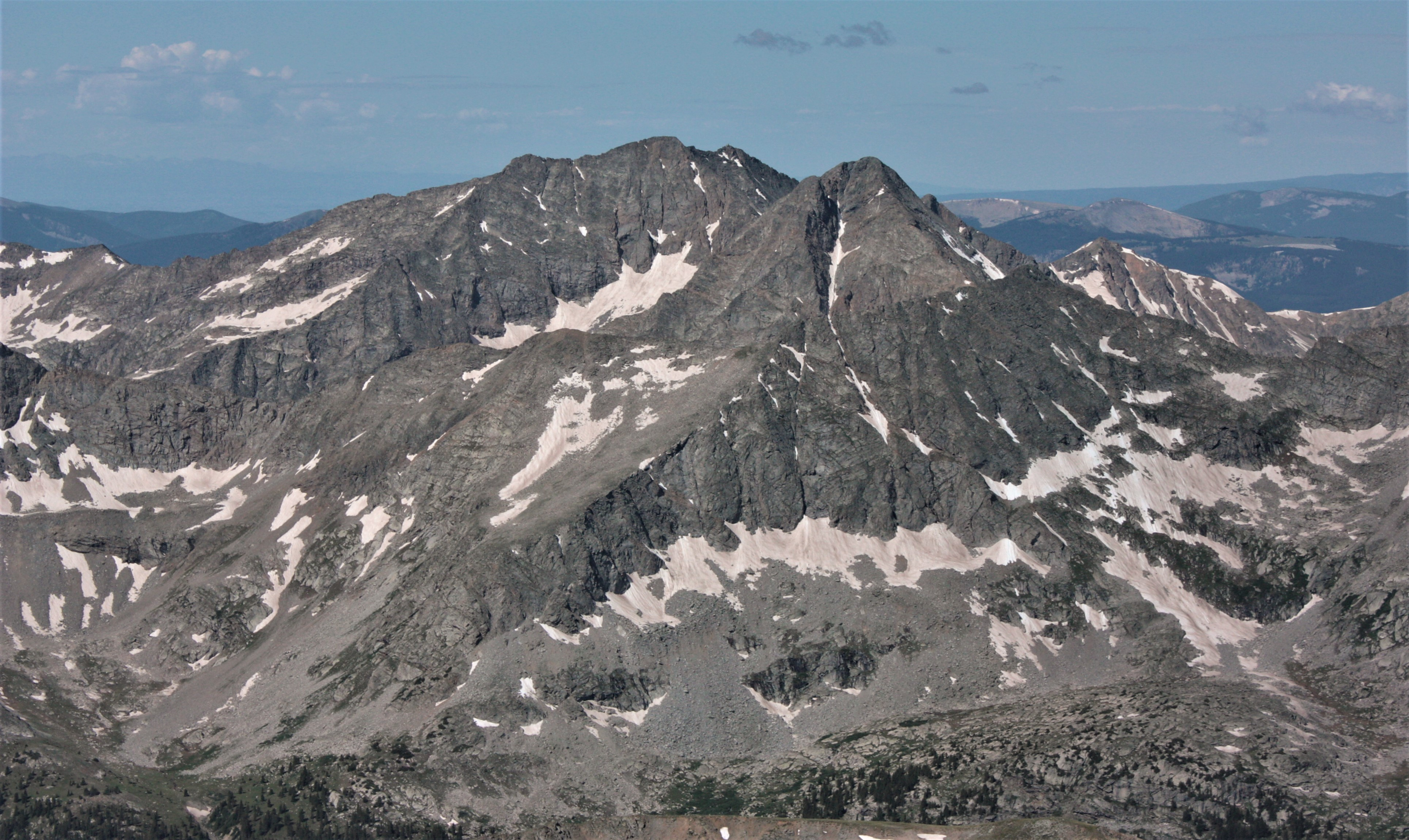
Northeast aspect
