= Sayres Benchmark =

Mountain in Colorado, United States

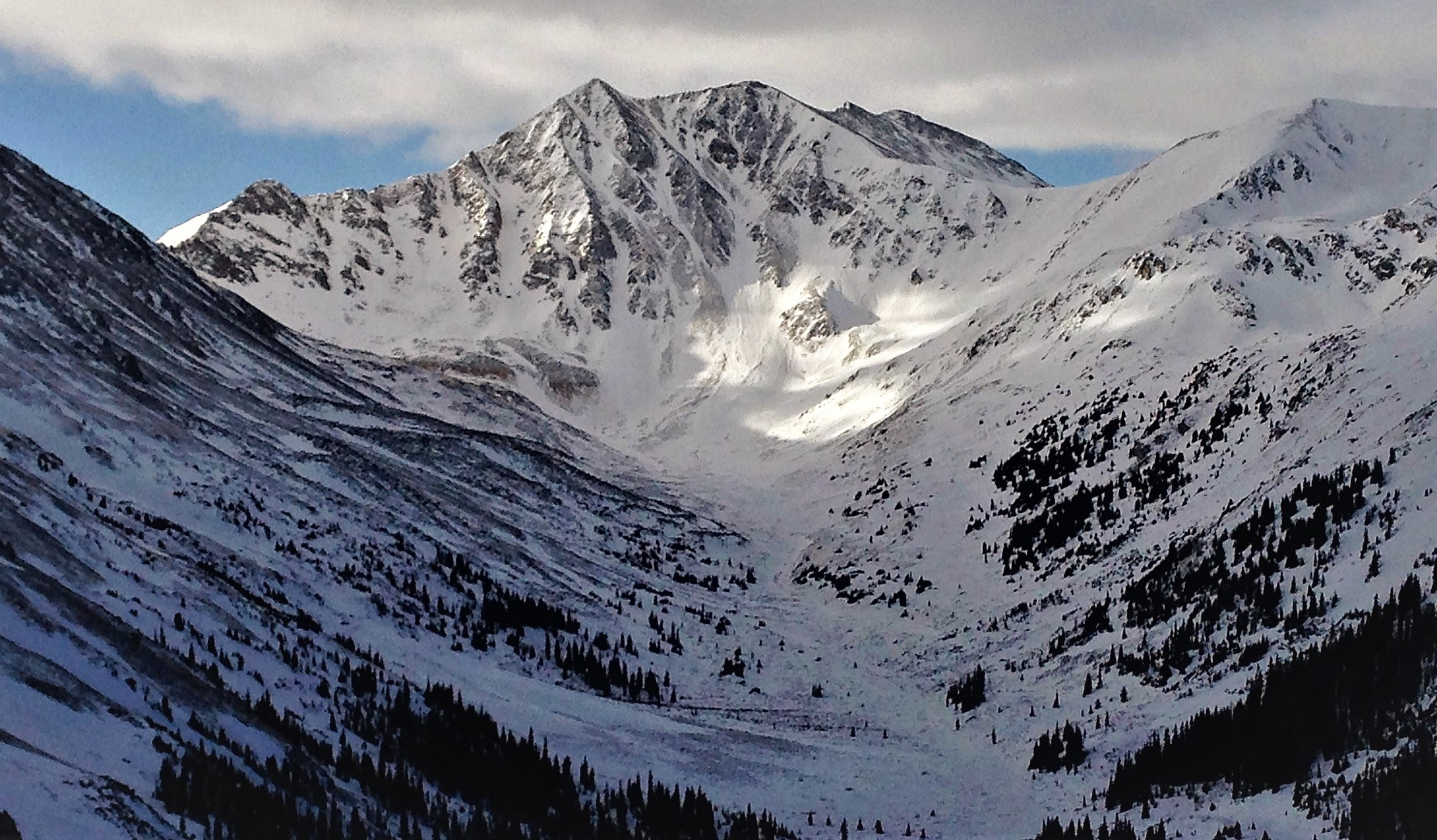
- North face in winter

Highest point
- Elevation: 13,746 ft (4,190 m)
- Prominence: 968 ft (295 m)
- Parent peak: La Plata Peak (14,343 ft)
- Isolation: 1.92 mi (3.09 km)
- Coordinates: 39°00′34″N 106°29′52″W

Geography
- Location within Colorado Location within the United States
- Country: United States
- State: Colorado
- County: Chaffee
- Protected area: Collegiate Peaks Wilderness
- Parent range: Rocky Mountains; Sawatch Range; Collegiate Peaks
- Topo map: USGS Mount Elbert

Climbing
- Easiest route: class 2 hiking

Sayres Benchmark is a 13,746-foot-elevation (4,190-meter) mountain summit in Chaffee County, Colorado, United States.

== Description ==
Sayres Benchmark is located three miles (4.8 km) east of the Continental Divide in the Collegiate Peaks which are a subset of the Sawatch Range. The mountain is set on the boundary of the Collegiate Peaks Wilderness on land managed by San Isabel National Forest. The highest peak in Colorado and the Rocky Mountains, Mount Elbert, is 7.46 miles (12.01 km) north-northeast of Sayres Benchmark, and the fifth-highest, La Plata Peak, is less than two miles to the northeast. Sayres ranks as the 130th-highest summit in Colorado. Precipitation runoff from the mountain's south slope drains into Clear Creek, whereas the north slope drains to Lake Creek, and both are tributaries of the Arkansas River. Topographic relief is significant as the summit rises 2,950 feet (899 m) above North Fork Clear Creek in 1.5 miles (2.4 km). An ascent of Sayres involves 10 miles of hiking with 3,500-feet of elevation gain. In winter the peak offers excellent ski mountaineering on its rugged north face.

== Climate ==
According to the Köppen climate classification system, Sayres Benchmark is located in an alpine subarctic climate zone with cold, snowy winters, and cool to warm summers. Due to its elevation, it receives precipitation all year, as snow in winter and as thunderstorms in summer, with a dry period in late spring. Climbers can expect afternoon rain, hail, and lightning from the seasonal monsoon in late July and August.

== Gallery ==
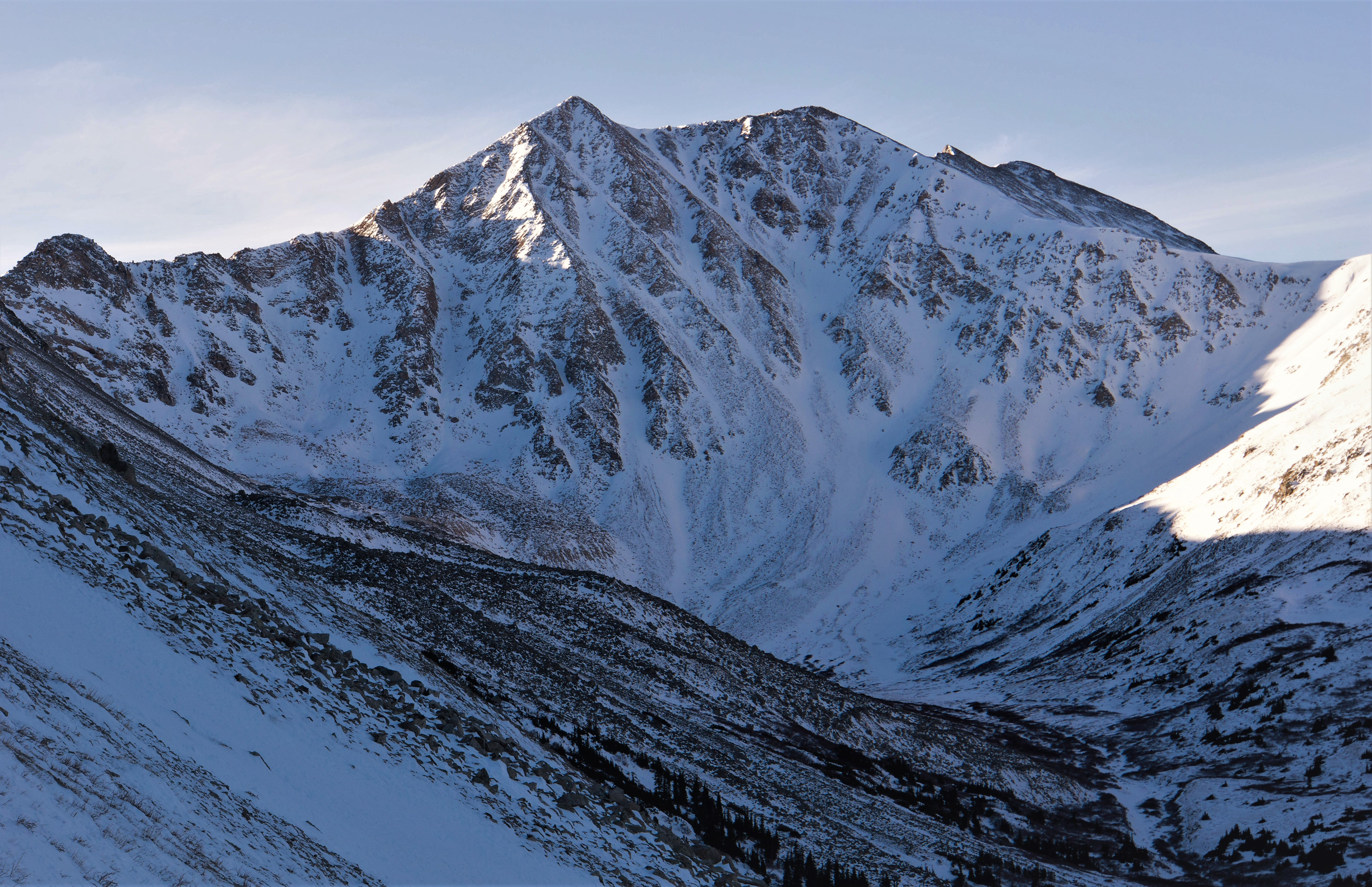
North face

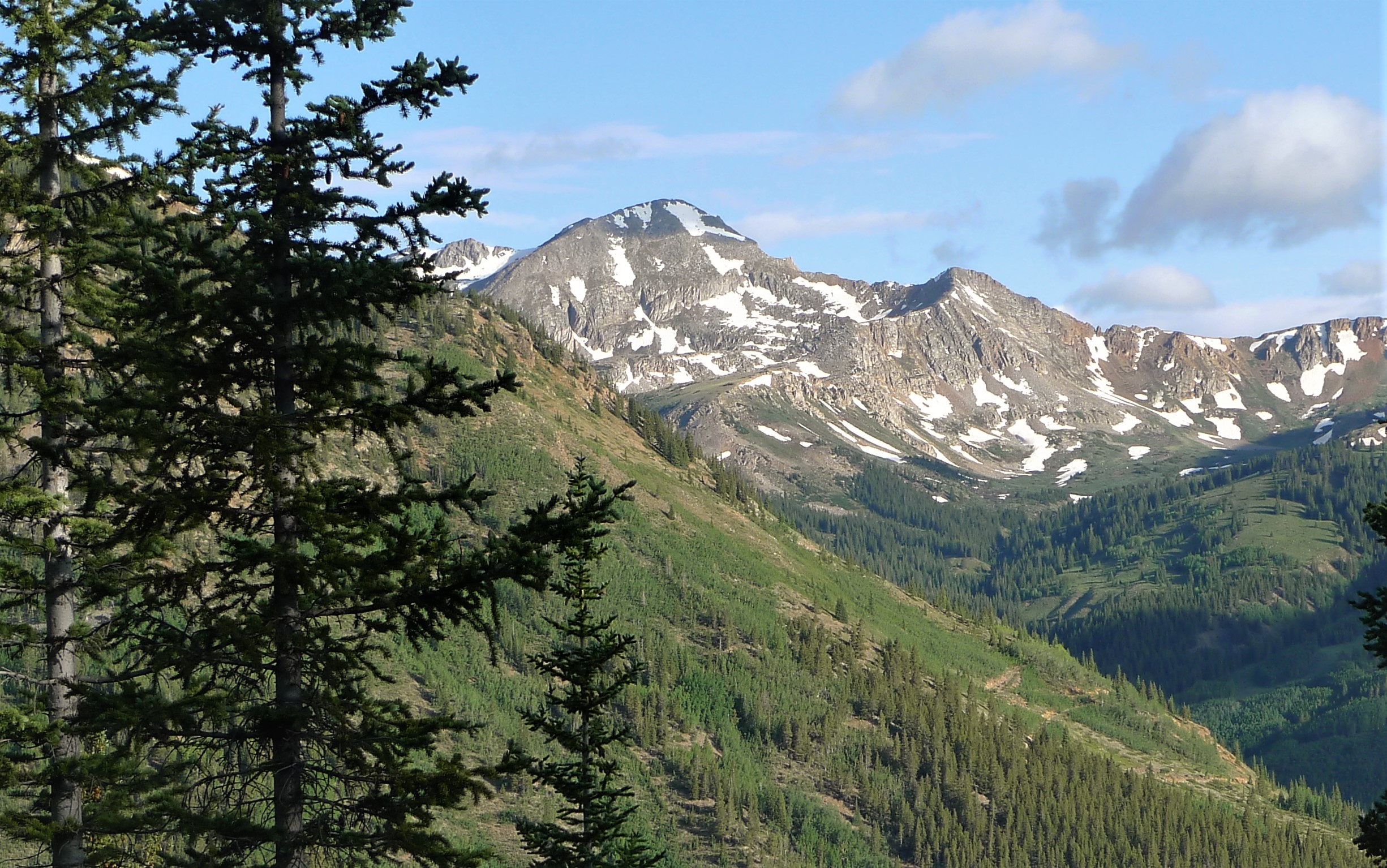
Southeast aspect

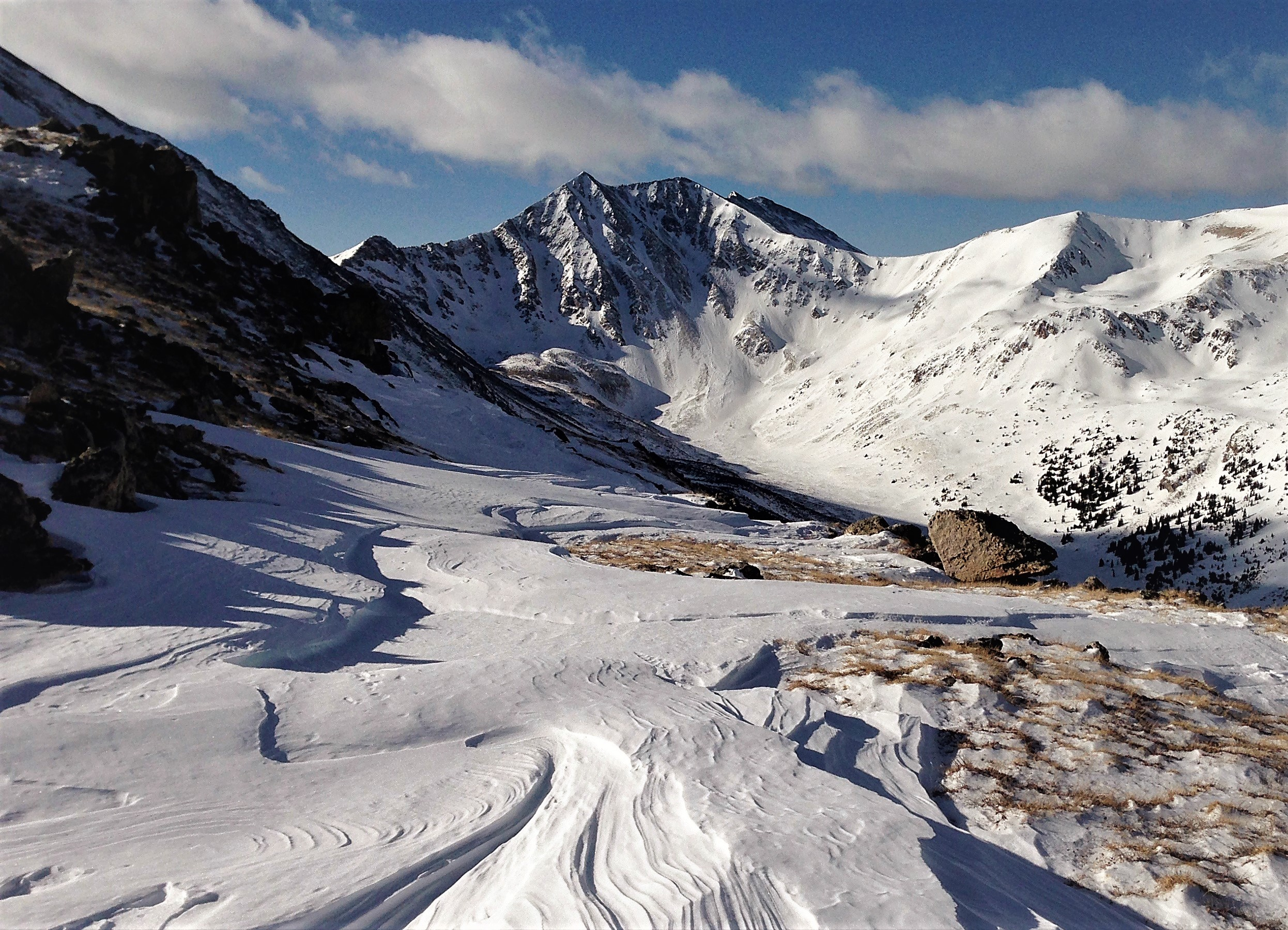
Sayres Benchmark in winter

== See also ==
- Mountains of Chaffee County, Colorado
- Thirteener
