= Emma Burr Mountain =

Mountain in the state of Colorado

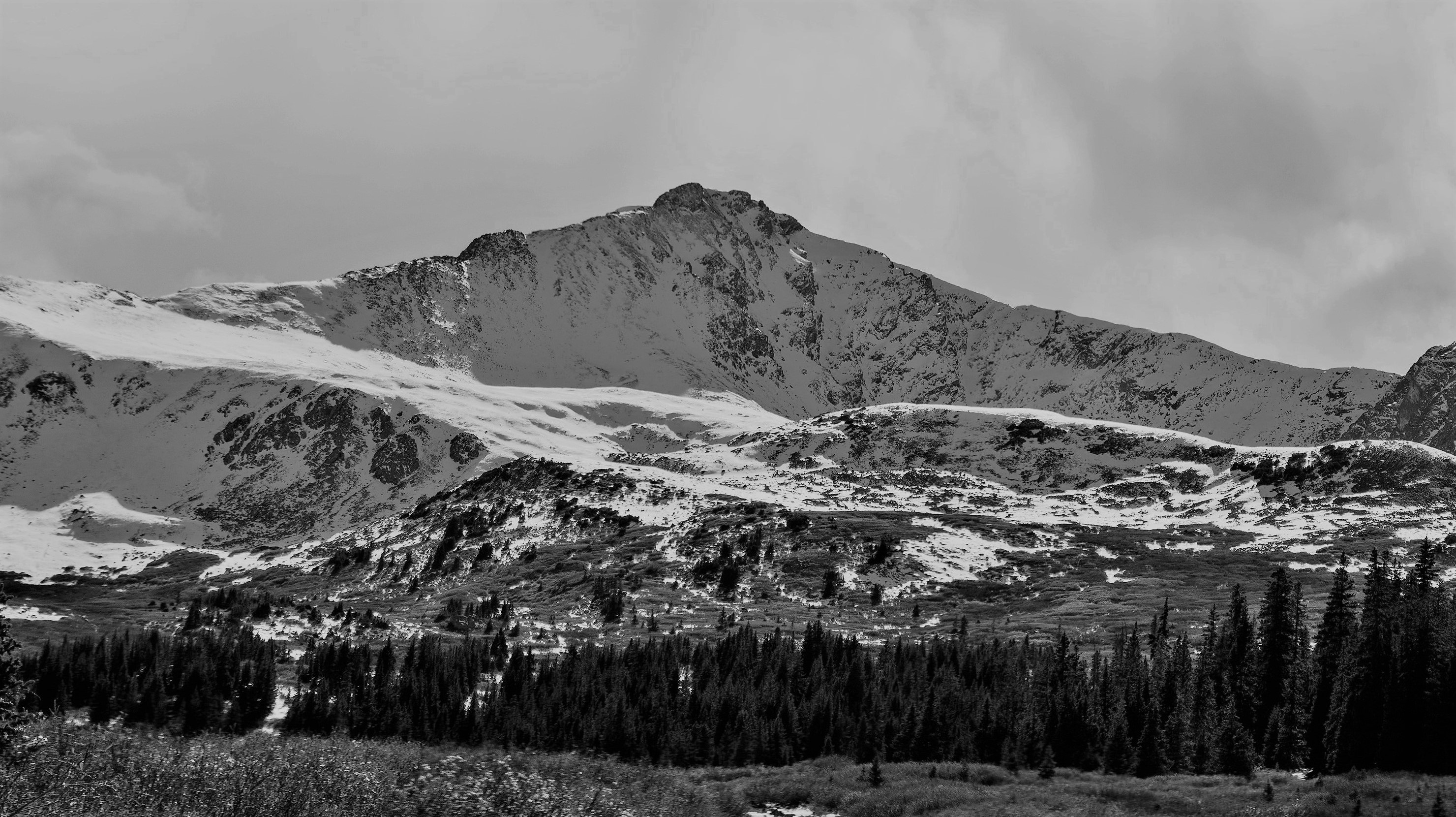
- Northeast aspect

Highest point
- Elevation: 13,544 ft (4,128 m)
- Prominence: 1,241 ft (378 m)
- Parent peak: Mount Princeton (14,204 ft)
- Isolation: 6.94 mi (11.17 km)
- Coordinates: 38°44′01″N 106°25′00″W

Geography
- Location within Colorado Location within the United States
- Country: United States
- State: Colorado
- County: Chaffee / Gunnison
- Protected area: San Isabel National Forest; Gunnison National Forest
- Parent range: Rocky Mountains; Sawatch Range; Collegiate Peaks
- Topo map: USGS Cumberland Pass

Geology
- Rock type: Schist

Climbing
- Easiest route: class 2 hiking

Emma Burr Mountain is a 13,544-foot-elevation (4,128-meter) mountain summit on the common border shared by Chaffee and Gunnison counties in Colorado, United States.

== Description ==
Emma Burr Mountain is set on the Continental Divide in the Collegiate Peaks which are a subrange of the Sawatch Range. The mountain ranks as the 12th-highest peak in Gunnison County and the 226th-highest in Colorado. The peak is located 3.5 miles (5.6 km) southeast of the community of Tincup in the San Isabel National Forest and Gunnison National Forest. Precipitation runoff from the mountain's east slope drains into tributaries of Cottonwood Creek which in turn is a tributary of the Arkansas River, whereas the west slope drains to Willow Creek which is a tributary of the Taylor River. Topographic relief is significant as the summit rises nearly 2,600 feet (792 m) above Mirror Lake in less than one mile (1.6 km). The peak is the highest point along the Continental Divide for a 160-mile stretch from Carson Peak to an unnamed peak with elevation 13,570-ft.

== History ==
In 1878, lode deposits were discovered in the vicinity, and the town of Virginia City was laid out in March 1879. By 1881 there were numerous mines, the principal ones being Gold Cup, Emma Burr, Anna Dedrika, Tin Cup, Mayflower, Cumberland, Jimmy Mack, King and Queen. The name of the town was changed to Tincup, a nearby pass to the south was named Cumberland Pass, and mountains were named Emma Burr Mountain and Anna Mountain. The name "Emma Burr Mountain" appeared in publications in 1882. The mountain's toponym was officially adopted in 1963 by the United States Board on Geographic Names.

== Climate ==
According to the Köppen climate classification system, Emma Burr Mountain is located in an alpine subarctic climate zone with cold, snowy winters, and cool to warm summers. Due to its altitude, it receives precipitation all year, as snow in winter and as thunderstorms in summer, with a dry period in late spring. Climbers can expect afternoon rain, hail, and lightning from the seasonal monsoon in late July and August.

== See also ==
- List of mountain peaks of Colorado
- Thirteener
