= Garfield Peak =

Garfield Peak may refer to:

- Garfield Peak (Colorado)
- Garfield Peak (Oregon)
- Garfield Peak (Wyoming)

== See also ==
- Mount Garfield (disambiguation)
- Garfield Mountain (disambiguation)
