= Emerald Peak (Colorado) =

Mountain in the state of Colorado

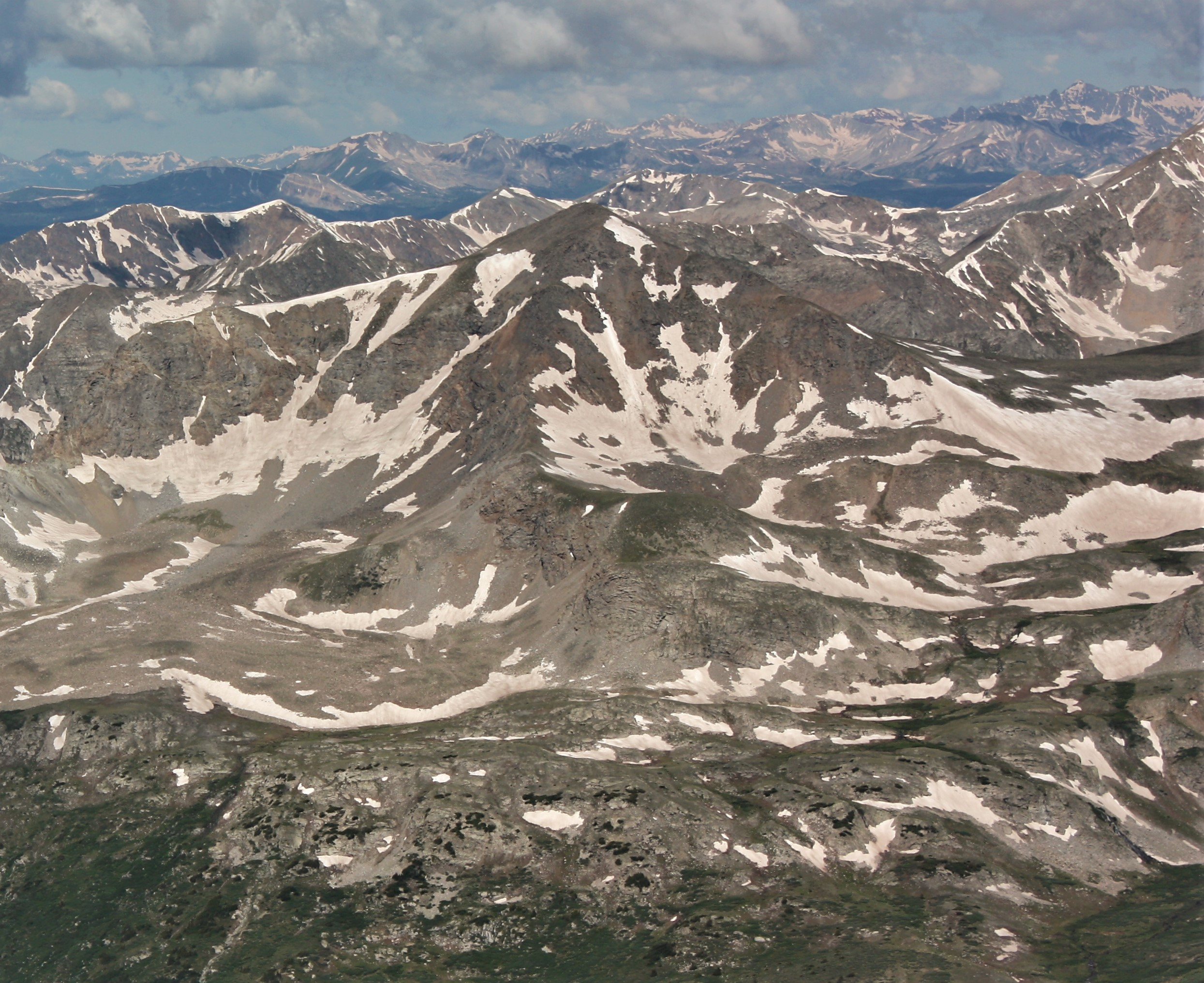
- East aspect, centered

Highest point
- Elevation: 13,911 ft (4,240 m)
- Prominence: 564 ft (172 m)
- Parent peak: Missouri Mountain
- Isolation: 1.30 mi (2.09 km)
- Coordinates: 38°55′44″N 106°22′52″W

Geography
- Location within Colorado
- Location: Chaffee County, Colorado, U.S.
- Parent range: Sawatch Range, Collegiate Peaks
- Topo map(s): USGS 7.5' topographic map Winfield, Colorado

Emerald Peak is a high mountain summit of the Collegiate Peaks in the Sawatch Range of the Rocky Mountains of North America. The 13,911-foot (4,240 m) thirteener is located in the Collegiate Peaks Wilderness of San Isabel National Forest, 14.7 miles (23.7 km) west-northwest (bearing 298°) of the Town of Buena Vista in Chaffee County, Colorado, United States.

== See also ==
- List of Colorado mountain ranges
- List of Colorado mountain summits
  - List of Colorado fourteeners
  - List of Colorado 4000 meter prominent summits
  - List of the most prominent summits of Colorado
- List of Colorado county high points
