= Jones Mountain (Chaffee County, Colorado) =

Mountain in the state of Colorado

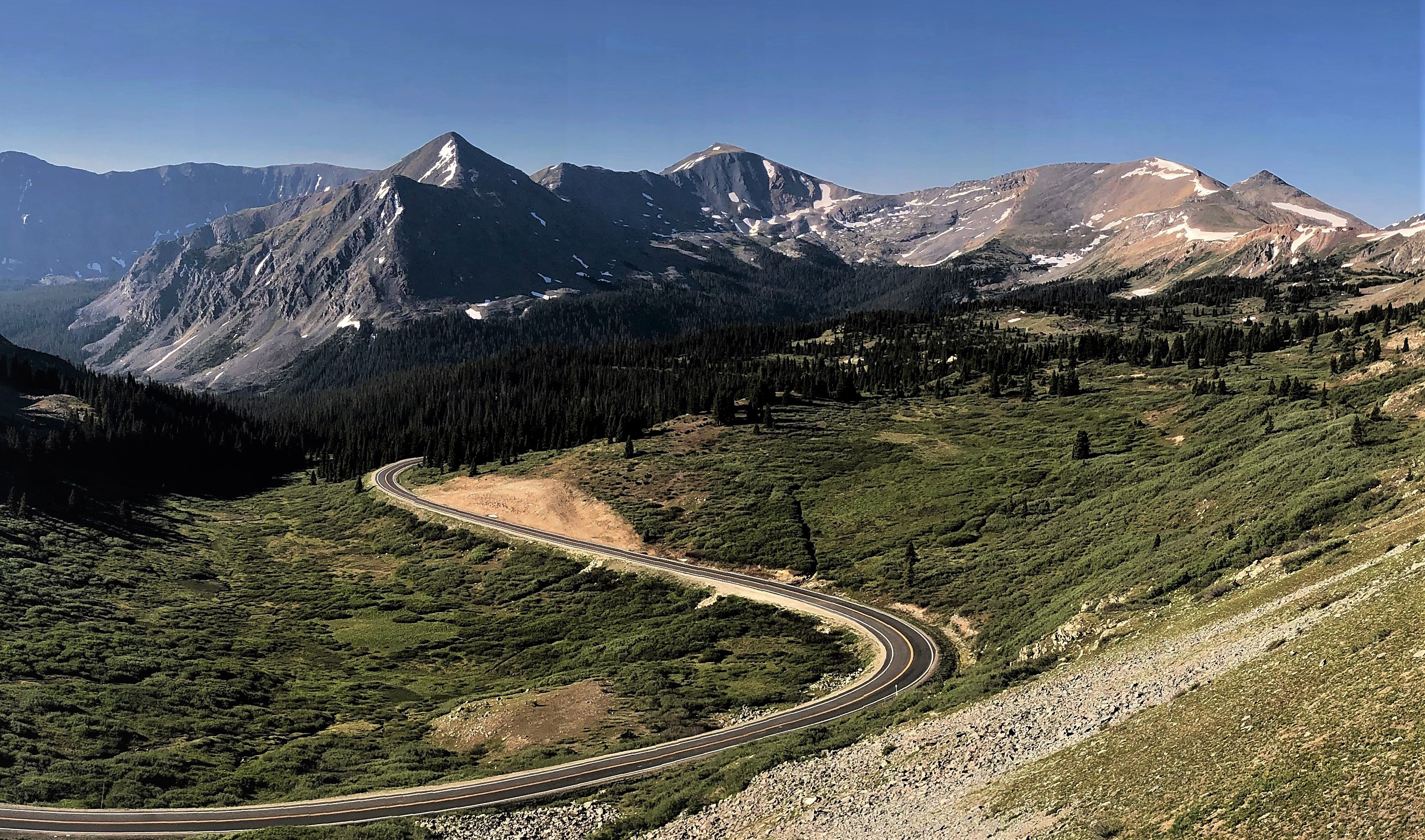
- North aspect, from Cottonwood Pass

Highest point
- Elevation: 13,218 ft (4,029 m)
- Prominence: 633 ft (193 m)
- Parent peak: Emma Burr Mountain (13,544 ft)
- Isolation: 3.00 mi (4.83 km)
- Coordinates: 38°46′24″N 106°23′39″W

Geography
- Location within Colorado Location within the United States
- Country: United States
- State: Colorado
- County: Chaffee County
- Protected area: San Isabel National Forest
- Parent range: Rocky Mountains; Sawatch Range; Collegiate Peaks
- Topo map: USGS Tincup

Climbing
- Easiest route: class 2 hiking

Jones Mountain is a 13,218-foot-elevation (4,029-meter) mountain summit in Chaffee County, Colorado, United States.

== Description ==
Jones Mountain is set approximately one mile east of the Continental Divide in the Collegiate Peaks which are a subrange of the Sawatch Range. The peak is located 14.5 miles (23.3 km) west of the community of Buena Vista in the San Isabel National Forest. Precipitation runoff from the mountain's slopes drains into tributaries of Cottonwood Creek which in turn is a tributary of the Arkansas River. Topographic relief is significant as the summit rises over 1,800 feet (549 m) above the creek's south fork in one mile (1.6 km). Chaffee County Road 306 traverses the northern base of this mountain near Cottonwood Pass. The mountain's toponym has been officially adopted by the United States Board on Geographic Names.

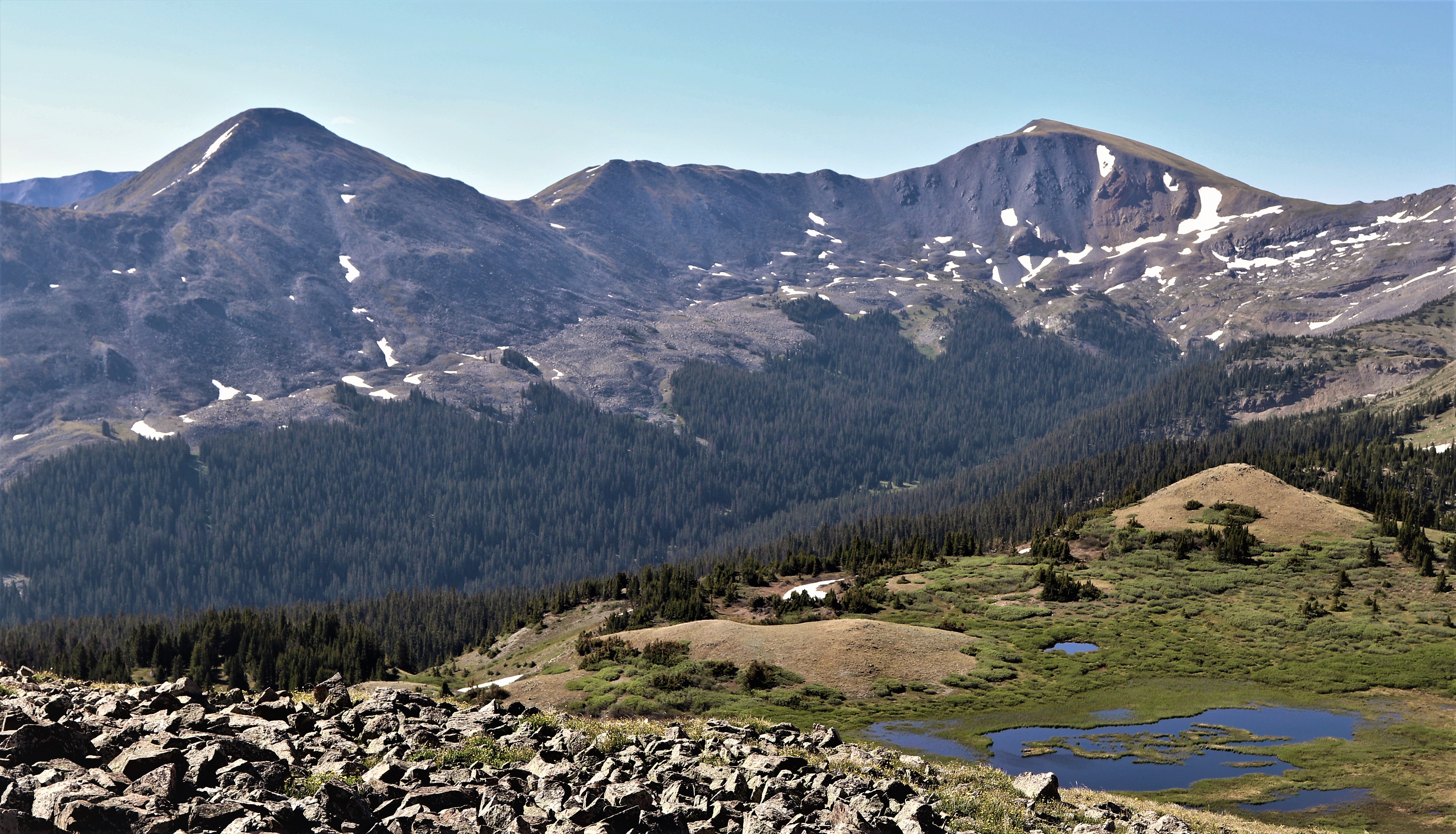
Northwest aspect, North Jones Mountain (left), summit to the right

== Climate ==
According to the Köppen climate classification system, Jones Mountain is located in an alpine subarctic climate zone with cold, snowy winters, and cool to warm summers. Due to its altitude, it receives precipitation all year, as snow in winter and as thunderstorms in summer, with a dry period in late spring. Climbers can expect afternoon rain, hail, and lightning from the seasonal monsoon in late July and August.

== See also ==
- List of mountain peaks of Colorado
- Thirteener
