= Emerald Peak =

Emerald Peak may refer to the following mountain summits:

- Emerald Peak (California), in Kings Canyon National Park, in the Sierra Nevada range
- Emerald Peak (Colorado), in San Isabel National Forest, in the Sawatch Range
- Emerald Peak (Washington), in Glacier Peak Wilderness, in the Chelan Mountains
- Emerald Peak (Yoho), British Columbia, in the Canadian Rockies
