= Silver King Peak =

Silver King Peak may also be:

- Crystal Mountain (Washington)
- Peak 13,762 (Silver King Peak)

== See also ==
- Silver Peak (disambiguation)
