= Mount Belford =

Mountain in the state of Colorado, United States

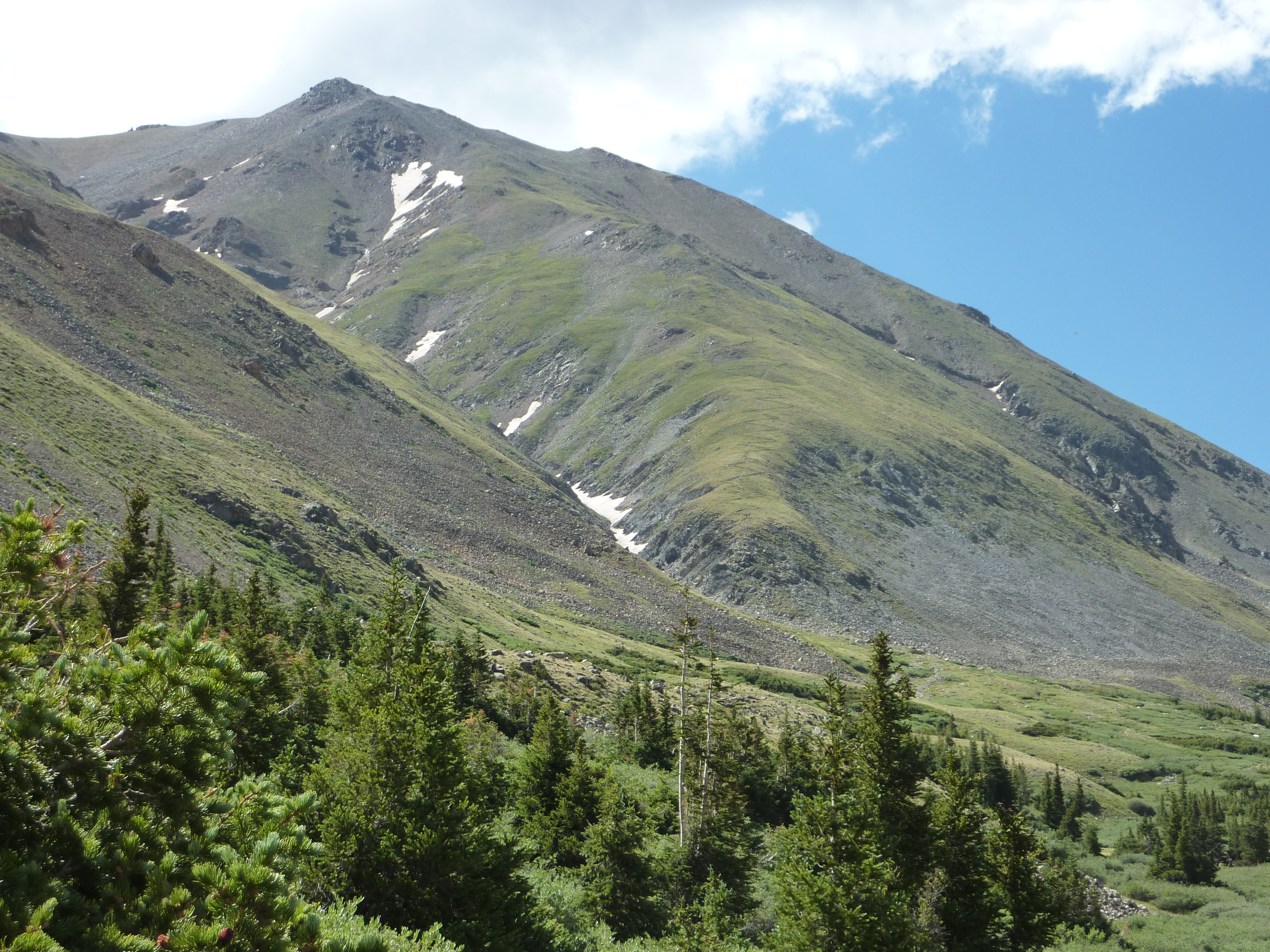

Highest point
- Elevation: 14,199.6 ft (4,328.0 m); NAPGD2022
- Prominence: 1,337 ft (408 m)
- Parent peak: Mount Harvard
- Isolation: 3.30 mi (5.31 km)
- Listing: Colorado Fourteener 19th
- Coordinates: 38°57′38″N 106°21′39″W

Geography
- Location within Colorado
- Location: Chaffee County, Colorado, U.S.
- Parent range: Sawatch Range, Collegiate Peaks
- Topo map(s): USGS 7.5' topographic map Mount Harvard, Colorado

Climbing
- Easiest route: Northwest Ridge: Hike, class 2

Mount Belford is a high mountain summit of the Collegiate Peaks in the Sawatch Range of the Rocky Mountains of North America. The 14,199.6-foot (4,328 m) fourteener is located in the Collegiate Peaks Wilderness of San Isabel National Forest, 15.0 miles (24.1 km) northwest by west (bearing 307°) of the Town of Buena Vista in Chaffee County, Colorado, United States.

== Climbing ==
Mount Belford lies near Mount Oxford and Missouri Mountain, and is often climbed in conjunction with one or both of these peaks. The standard route is rated Class 2.

== Climate ==
Climate data for Mount Belford 38.9587 N, 106.3575 W, Elevation: 13,848 ft (4,221 m) (1991–2020 normals)
Month	Jan	Feb	Mar	Apr	May	Jun	Jul	Aug	Sep	Oct	Nov	Dec	Year
Mean daily maximum °F (°C)	20.9 (−6.2)	20.2 (−6.6)	25.2 (−3.8)	30.2 (−1.0)	39.1 (3.9)	51.0 (10.6)	56.6 (13.7)	54.5 (12.5)	48.4 (9.1)	38.0 (3.3)	27.4 (−2.6)	21.2 (−6.0)	36.1 (2.2)
Daily mean °F (°C)	9.2 (−12.7)	8.2 (−13.2)	12.7 (−10.7)	17.4 (−8.1)	26.1 (−3.3)	36.8 (2.7)	42.5 (5.8)	41.0 (5.0)	35.0 (1.7)	25.4 (−3.7)	16.2 (−8.8)	9.9 (−12.3)	23.4 (−4.8)
Mean daily minimum °F (°C)	−2.4 (−19.1)	−3.8 (−19.9)	0.2 (−17.7)	4.5 (−15.3)	13.2 (−10.4)	22.5 (−5.3)	28.4 (−2.0)	27.6 (−2.4)	21.6 (−5.8)	12.8 (−10.7)	5.1 (−14.9)	−1.5 (−18.6)	10.7 (−11.8)
Average precipitation inches (mm)	4.00 (102)	3.91 (99)	4.19 (106)	5.37 (136)	3.65 (93)	1.48 (38)	2.80 (71)	3.07 (78)	2.57 (65)	3.03 (77)	3.64 (92)	3.64 (92)	41.35 (1,049)
Source: PRISM Climate Group

== See also ==
- List of mountain peaks of Colorado
  - List of Colorado fourteeners
