= Mount Oxford (Colorado) =

Mountain in Colorado, United States

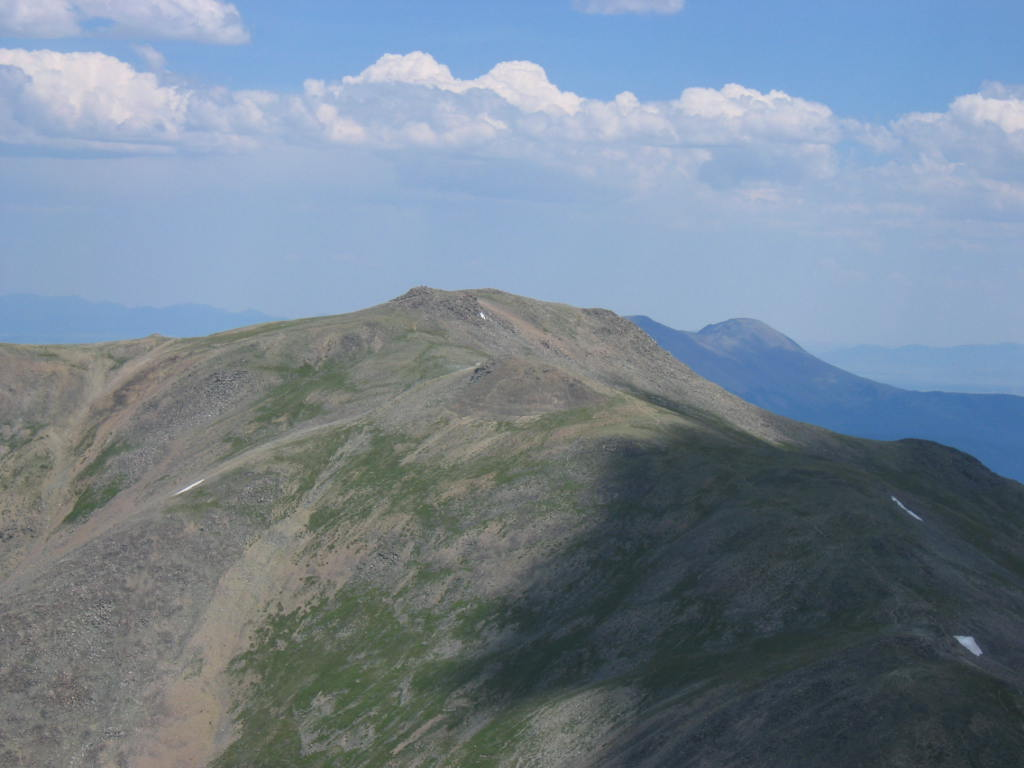

Highest point
- Elevation: 14,156.3 ft (4,314.8 m); NAPGD2022
- Prominence: 653 ft (199 m)
- Isolation: 1.22 mi (1.96 km)
- Listing: Colorado Fourteener 26th
- Coordinates: 38°57′53″N 106°20′20″W

Geography
- Location within Colorado
- Location: Chaffee County, Colorado, U.S.
- Parent range: Sawatch Range, Collegiate Peaks
- Topo map(s): USGS 7.5' topographic map Mount Harvard, Colorado

Climbing
- Easiest route: Via Mt. Belford: Hike, class 2

Mount Oxford is a high mountain summit of the Collegiate Peaks in the Sawatch Range of the Rocky Mountains of North America. The 14,156.3-foot (4,315 m) fourteener is located in the Collegiate Peaks Wilderness of San Isabel National Forest, 14.2 miles (22.9 km) northwest (bearing 311°) of the Town of Buena Vista in Chaffee County, Colorado, United States. The mountain was named in honor of the University of Oxford.

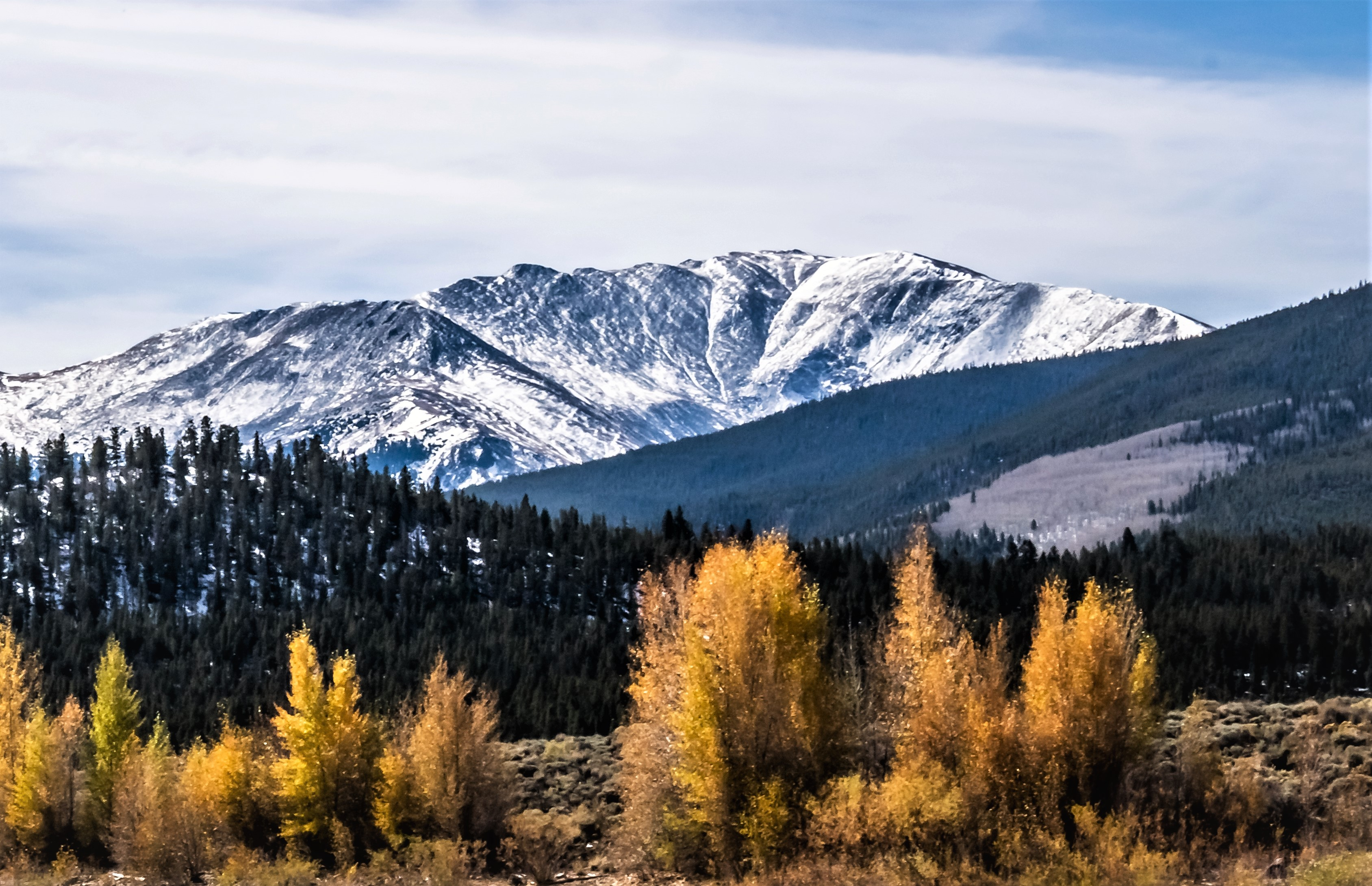
Mount Oxford (north aspect)

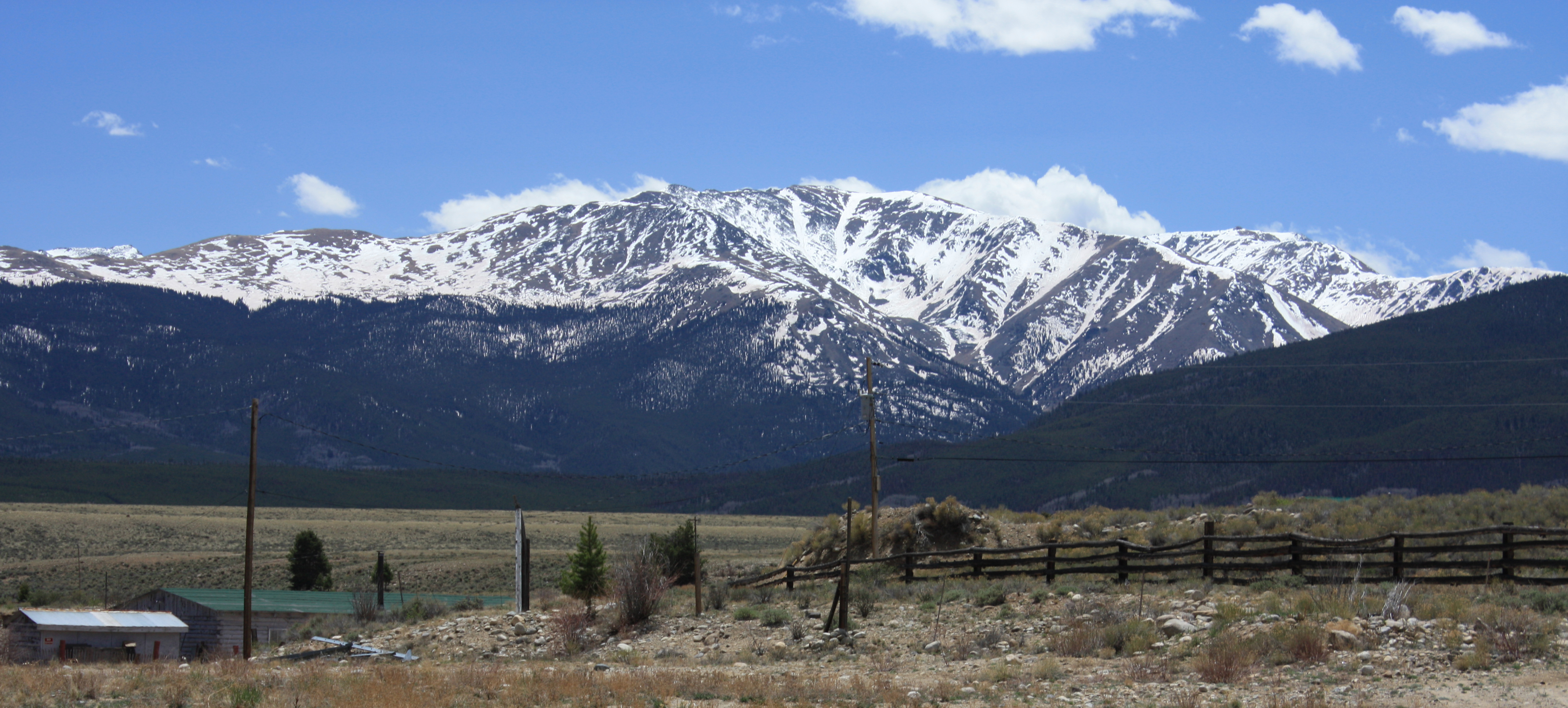
Mt. Oxford from Twin Lakes turnoff from US 24

== Mountain ==
Mount Oxford lies 1.2 miles (2.0 km) east by north of the slightly higher Mount Belford. For this reason it is often climbed in combination with Mount Belford.

== Historical names ==
- Mount Oxford
- Oxford Peak

== See also ==
- List of mountain peaks of Colorado
  - List of Colorado fourteeners
