= Mount Hope (Colorado) =

Mountain in Colorado, United States

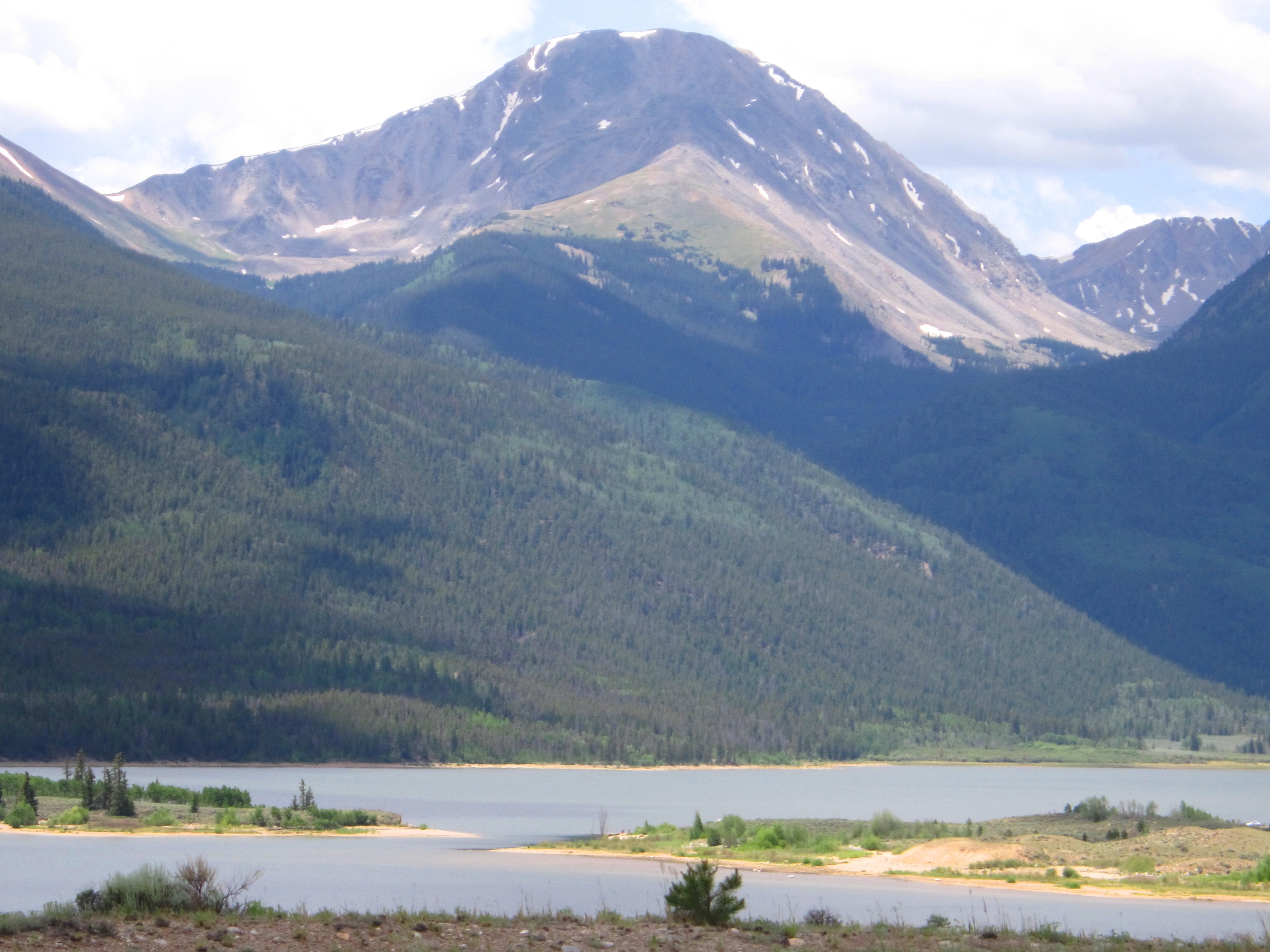
- Mount Hope

Highest point
- Elevation: 13,939 ft (4,249 m)
- Prominence: 853 ft (260 m)
- Isolation: 2.91 mi (4.68 km)
- Coordinates: 39°01′16″N 106°25′11″W

Geography
- Location within Colorado
- Location: Chaffee County, Colorado, U.S.
- Parent range: Sawatch Range, Collegiate Peaks
- Topo map(s): USGS 7.5' topographic map Mount Elbert, Colorado

Climbing
- Easiest route: hike

Mount Hope is a high mountain summit of the Collegiate Peaks in the Sawatch Range of the Rocky Mountains of North America. The 13,939-foot (4,249 m) thirteener is located in San Isabel National Forest, 20.1 miles (32.3 km) northwest (bearing 311°) of the Town of Buena Vista in Chaffee County, Colorado, United States.

== Mountain ==
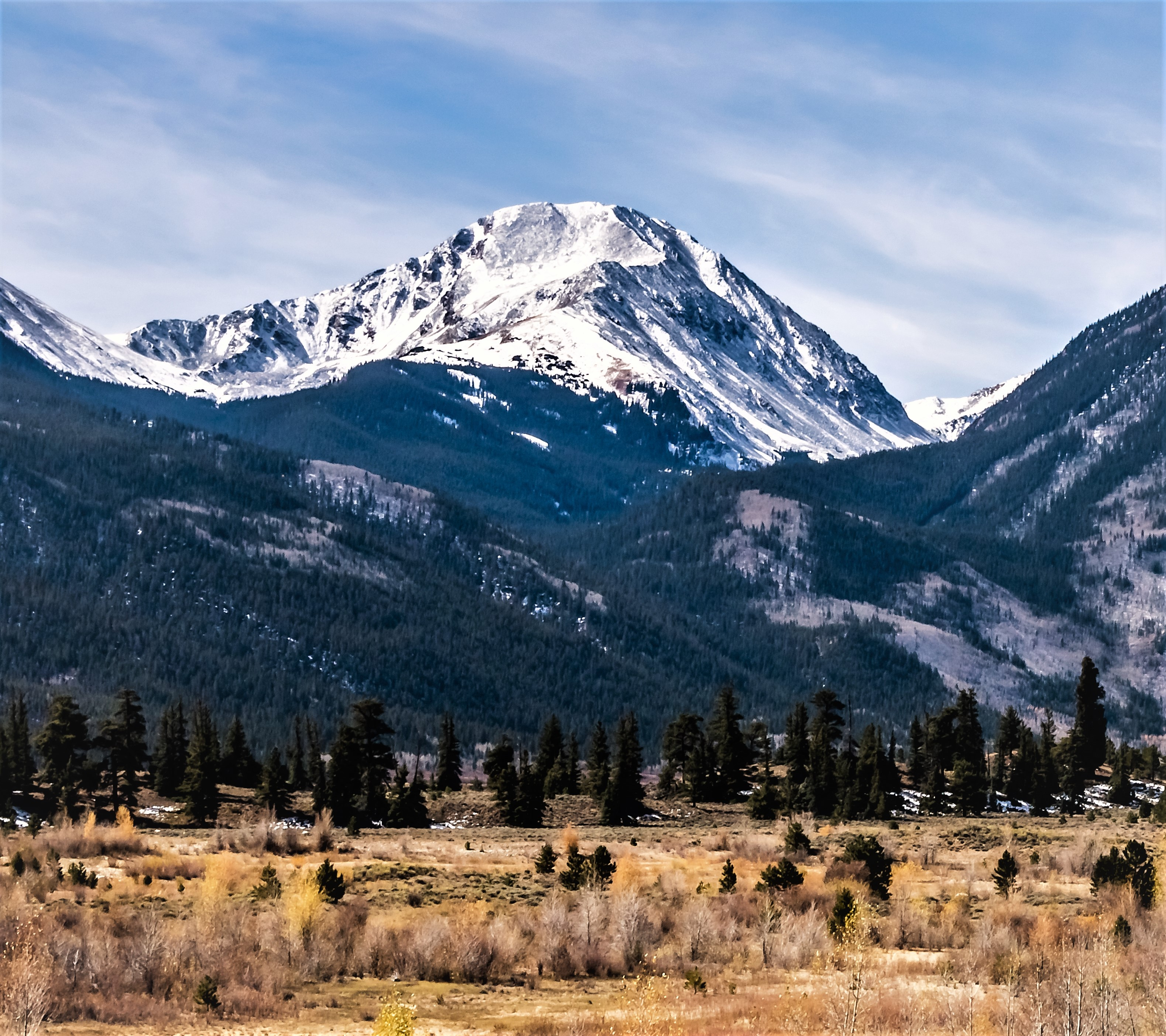
Mt. Hope from northeast

== See also ==
- List of Colorado mountain ranges
- List of Colorado mountain summits
  - List of Colorado fourteeners
  - List of Colorado 4000 meter prominent summits
  - List of the most prominent summits of Colorado
- List of Colorado county high points
