= Silver Peak =

Silver Peak may refer to:

== Mountains ==
=== United States ===
- Silver Peak (Arizona)
- Silver Peak (Alpine County, California)
- Silver Peak (Alpine County, California)
- Silver Peak (El Dorado County, California)
- Silver Peak (Fresno County, California)
- Silver Peak (Fresno County, California)
- Silver Peak (Inyo County, California)
- Silver Peak (Los Angeles County, California)
  - Silver Peak (Catalina Island, California)
- Silver Peak (Monterey County, California)
  - Silver Peak Wilderness
- Silver Peak (Placer County, California)
- Silver Peak (San Bernardino County, California)
- Silver Peak (Idaho)
- Silver Peak (Montana)
- Silver Peak (Elko County, Nevada)
- Silver Peak (Esmeralda County, Nevada)
- Silver Peak (New Mexico)
  - Silver Peak Range
- Silver Peak (Oregon)
- Silver Peak (South Dakota)
- Silver Peak (Texas)
- Silver Peak (Utah)
- Silver Peak (Virginia)
- Silver Peak (King County, Washington)

=== Canada ===
- Silver Peak (British Columbia)
- Silver Peak (Ontario)
- Silver Peak (Yukon)

=== New Zealand ===
- Silver peaks
- Silver Peak (hill)

== Communities ==
- Silver Peak, Nevada

== See also ==
- Silverpeaks, New Zealand
- Silver Peak Systems
- Silver King Peak (disambiguation)
