= Missouri Mountain =

Mountain in Colorado, United States

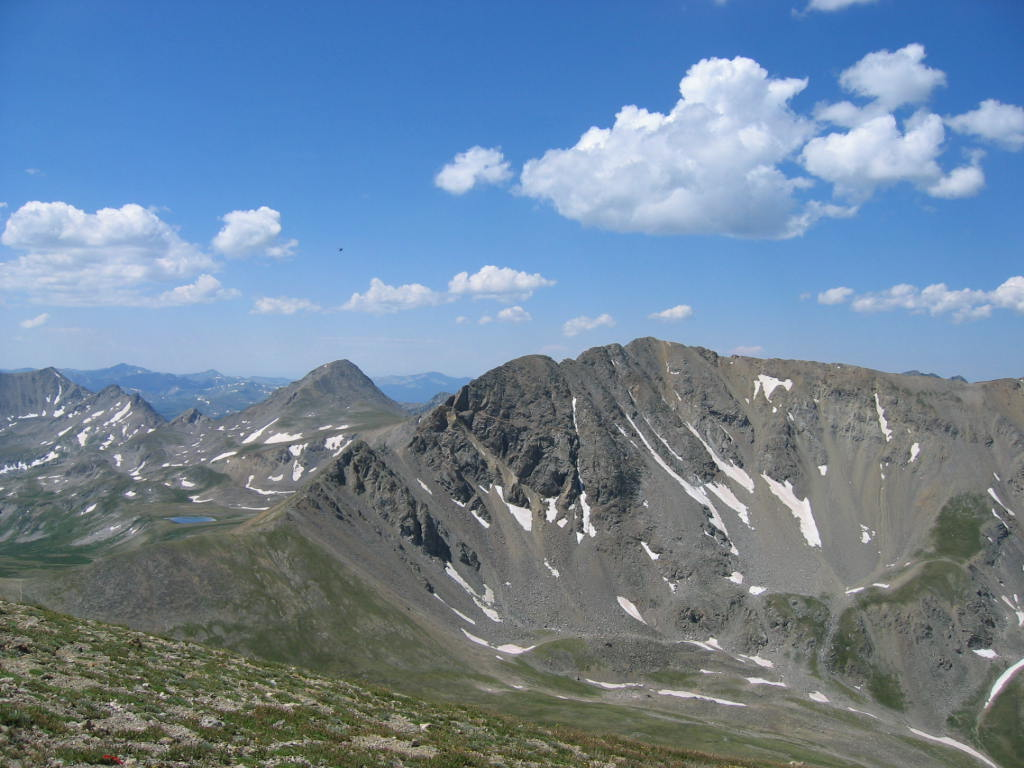

Highest point
- Elevation: 14,069.2 ft (4,288.3 m); NAPGD2022
- Prominence: 847 ft (258 m)
- Isolation: 1.31 mi (2.11 km)
- Listing: Colorado Fourteener 36th
- Coordinates: 38°56′51″N 106°22′43″W

Geography
- Location within Colorado
- Location: Chaffee County, Colorado, U.S.
- Parent range: Sawatch Range, Collegiate Peaks
- Topo map(s): USGS 7.5' topographic map Winfield, Colorado

Climbing
- Easiest route: Northwest Ridge: Hike, class 2

Missouri Mountain is a high mountain summit in the Collegiate Peaks of the Sawatch Range of the Rocky Mountains of North America. The 14,069.2-foot (4,288 m) fourteener is located in the Collegiate Peaks Wilderness of San Isabel National Forest, 15.2 miles (24.5 km) northwest by west (bearing 302°) of the Town of Buena Vista in Chaffee County, Colorado, United States. Missouri Mountain is separated from its eastern neighbor Mount Belford by Elkhead Pass (13,220 feet).

== Climbing ==
The standard route to the top is rated class 2.

== See also ==
- List of mountain peaks of Colorado
  - List of Colorado fourteeners
