= Mount Garfield =

Mount Garfield may refer to:

- Mount Garfield (Mesa County, Colorado), the high point of the Book Cliffs
- Mount Garfield (San Juan County, Colorado), part of the San Juan Mountains
- Mount Garfield (New Hampshire)

== See also ==
- Garfield Mountain (disambiguation)
- Garfield Peak (disambiguation)
