= Huron Peak =

Mountain summit in Colorado, US

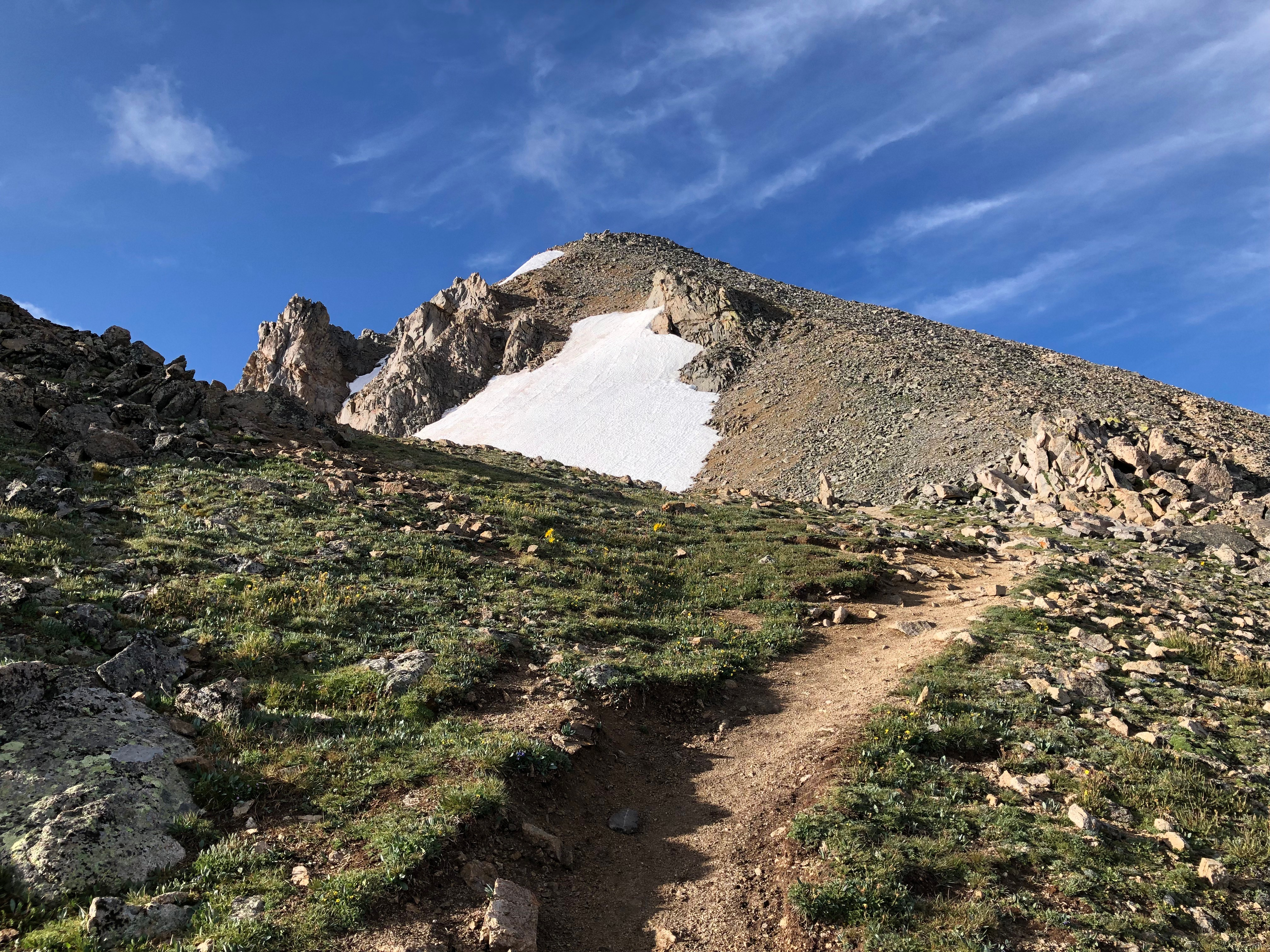
- Near the summit of Huron Peak

Highest point
- Elevation: 14,004.1 ft (4,268.4 m); NAPGD2022
- Prominence: 1,403 ft (428 m)
- Isolation: 3.2 mi (5.1 km)
- Listing: Colorado Fourteener 51st
- Coordinates: 38°56′44″N 106°26′17″W

Geography
- Location within Colorado
- Location: Chaffee County, Colorado, U.S.
- Parent range: Collegiate Peaks; Sawatch Range
- Topo map(s): USGS Winfield, Colorado

Climbing
- Easiest route: Northwest Slopes: Hike, class 2

Huron Peak is a high mountain summit of the Collegiate Peaks in the Sawatch Range of the Rocky Mountains. The 14,004.1-foot (4,268 m) fourteener is in the Collegiate Peaks Wilderness of San Isabel National Forest, 18.0 miles (28.9 km) west-northwest (bearing 297°) of the Town of Buena Vista in Chaffee County, Colorado, United States.

== Mountain ==
While relatively close to its neighbor peaks, Huron Peak is separated from them by deep cols, resulting in a moderately high topographic prominence. Nearby to the south are the Three Apostles, a striking group of three 13,000-foot peaks.

It was named after the Huron Indians (Wendat people).

=== Climbing ===
The easiest route to the top is rated Class 2.

== Flight for Life accident ==
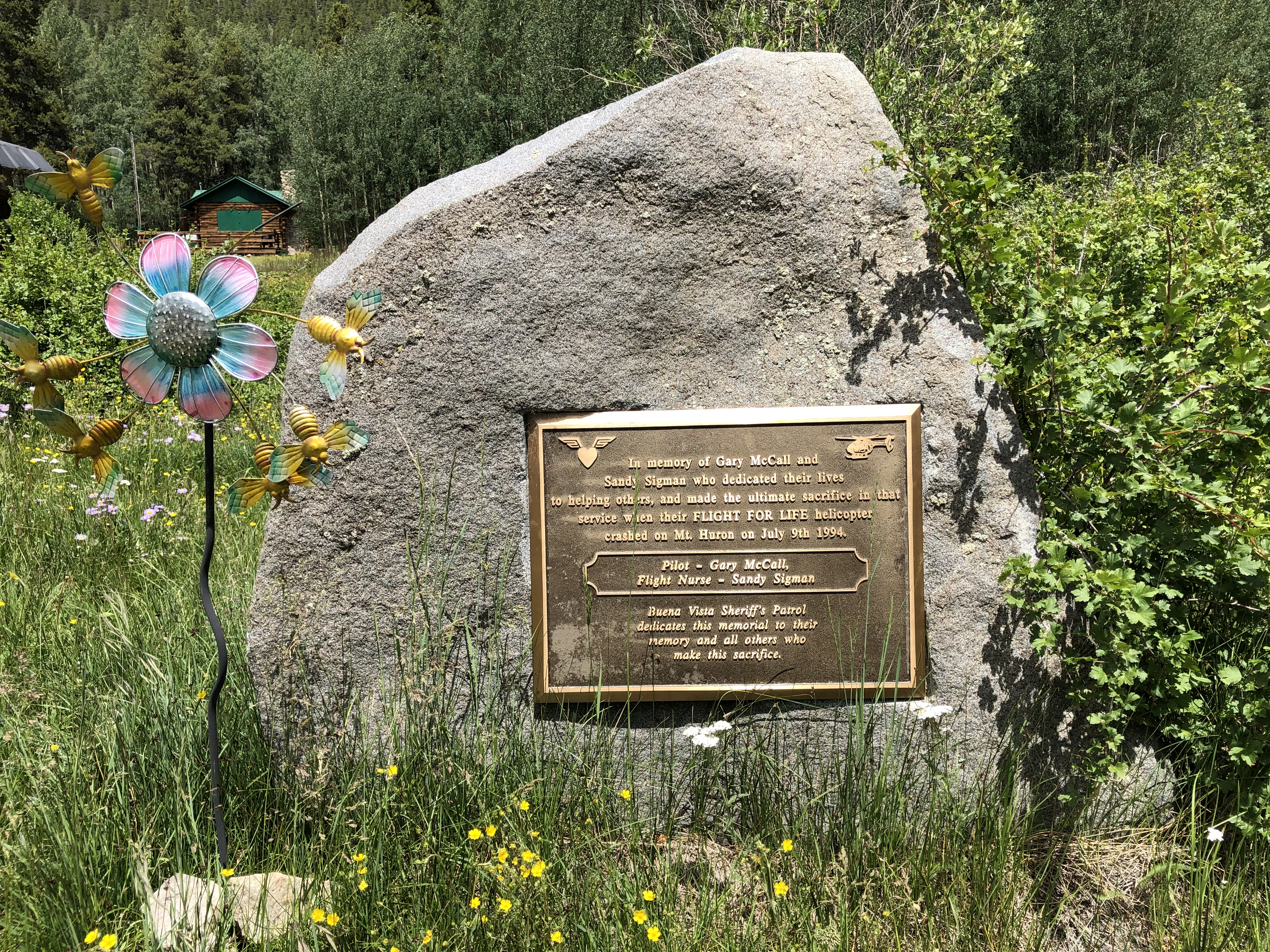
Memorial in Winfield Colorado (near Huron Peak) for Flight for Life helicopter crash victims

On July 9, 1994, a Flight for Life Aérospatiale Eurocopter AS350 rescue helicopter crashed on Huron Peak at approximately 12,200 feet while attempting to rescue a hiker who had suffered a broken ankle. With numerous search and rescue personnel nearby, the aircraft's pilot, Gary McCall, attempted to partially land on a 35-degree slope by placing one skid on the uphill side of the mountain. As rescuers stood under the rotors, shielding their faces from flying debris, they reported hearing "chopping" noises and saw the aircraft's rotors striking the mountainside.

The aircraft rolled approximately 800 feet down the mountain face, coming to rest near 11,400 feet. Rescuers scrambled to the wreckage, but McCall and flight nurse Sandy Sigman had been killed. The accident was the first in the history of the Flight for Life program.

The angle between the helicopter's rotor and skid was later determined to be 28 degrees. The National Transportation Safety Board ruled the cause of the accident as "Failure of the pilot to assure main rotor clearance from sloping terrain while in a hover. The terrain condition was a related factor."

== Climate ==
According to the Köppen climate classification system, Huron Peak is in an alpine subarctic climate zone with cold, snowy winters and cool to warm summers. Due to its altitude, it receives precipitation all year, as snow in winter, and as thunderstorms in summer, with a dry period in late spring.

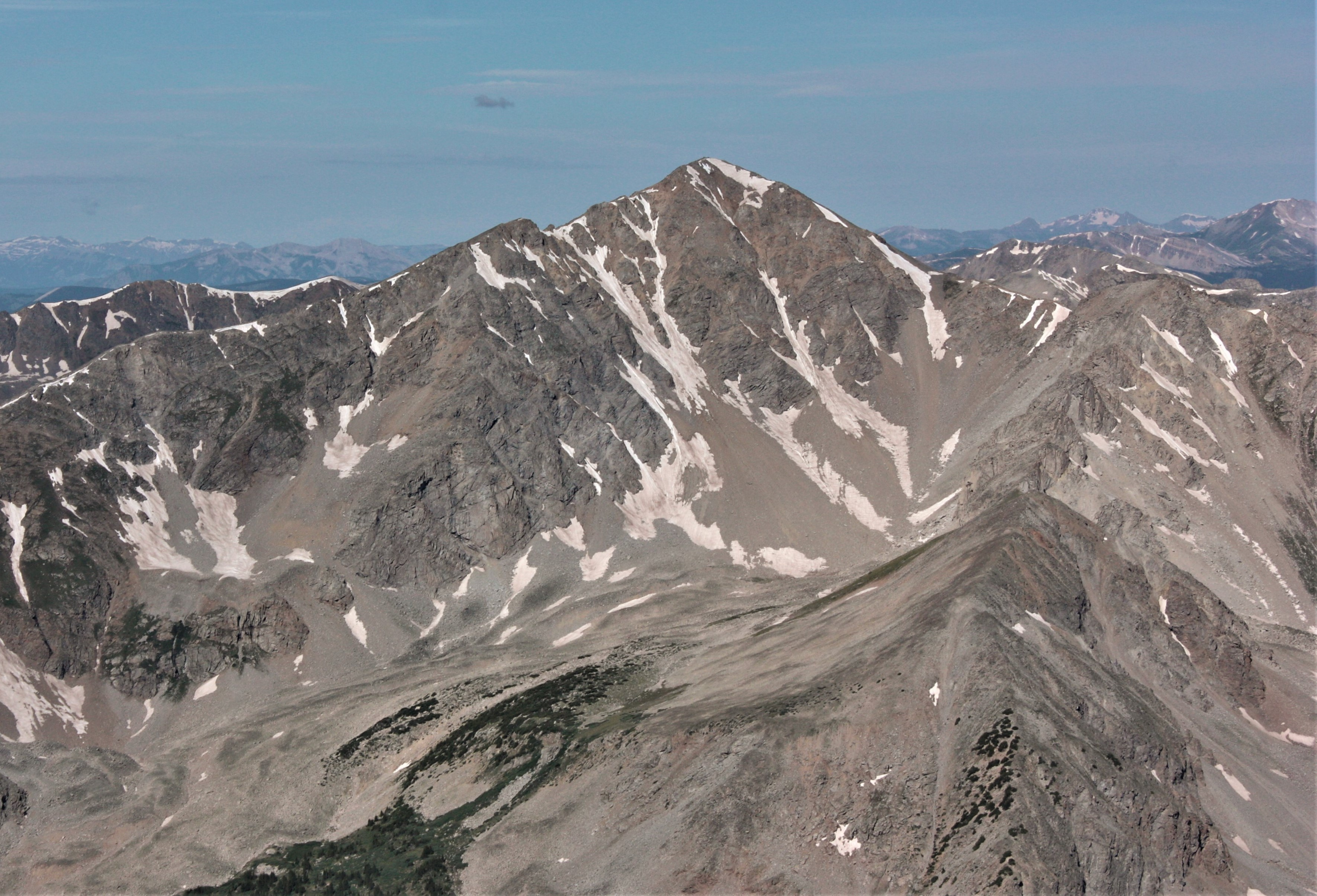
East aspect, from Missouri Mountain

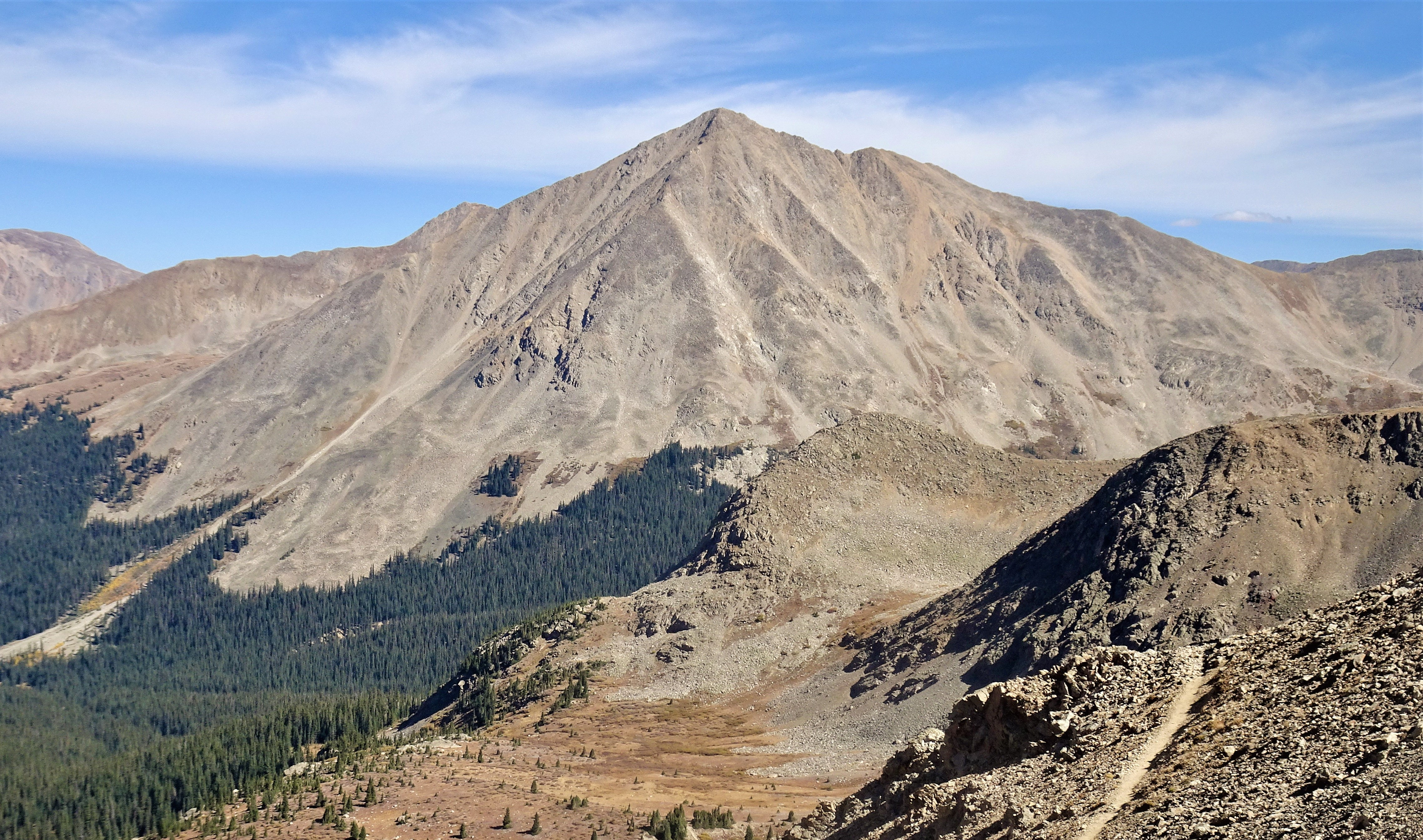
Southwest aspect
