= La Plata Peak =

Mountain in Colorado, United States

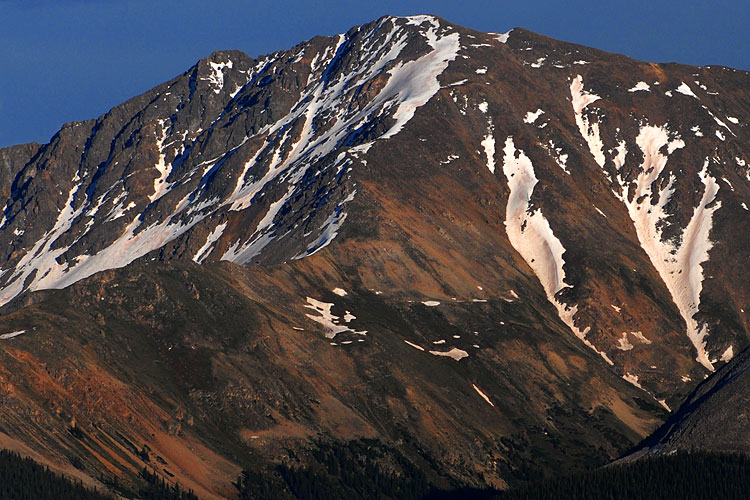

Highest point
- Elevation: 14,343 ft (4,372 m); NAVD88
- Prominence: 1836 ft (560 m)
- Isolation: 6.28 mi (10.11 km)
- Listing: North America highest peaks 34th; US highest major peaks 20th; Colorado highest major peaks 5th; Colorado fourteeners 5th
- Coordinates: 39°01′46″N 106°28′22″W

Geography
- Location within Colorado
- Location: Chaffee County, Colorado, U.S.
- Parent range: Sawatch Range, Collegiate Peaks
- Topo map(s): USGS 7.5' topographic map Mount Elbert, Colorado

Climbing
- First ascent: July 26, 1873 Hayden Survey
- Easiest route: Northwest Ridge or Southwest Ridge: Hike (class 2)

La Plata Peak is the fifth-highest summit of the Rocky Mountains of North America and the U.S. state of Colorado. The prominent 14,343-foot (4,372 m) fourteener is located in the Collegiate Peaks Wilderness of San Isabel National Forest, 22.7 miles (36.5 km) northwest by west (bearing 308°) of the Town of Buena Vista in Chaffee County, Colorado, United States. (Note: The elevation of La Plata Peak includes an adjustment of +1.983 m (+6.51 ft) from NGVD 29 to NAVD 88.)

"La Plata" is Spanish for "The Silver", a reference to the many silver deposits in the area. The nearby ghost towns of Winfield and Hamilton were prominent silver mining towns in the early part of the 20th century. A Hayden Survey team first climbed the peak on July 26, 1873.

The elevation of 14,361 feet marked on the USGS Mount Elbert Quadrangle is incorrect, and should read 14,336 feet (in the NGVD 29 vertical datum).

== Climbing Routes ==
Northwest Ridge: This is the standard route used to climb the mountain. Like most Sawatch range 14ers it is non-technical, but incredibly steep. The trail is 9.5 miles round trip, with 4,500 feet of elevation gain and class 2 hiking along the ridge.

Southwest Ridge: This is an alternate class 2 route with 3600 feet of elevation gain and 7.5 miles of hiking.

Ellingwood Ridge: Ellingwood Ridge is one of the most technically difficult alternate routes in the Sawatch range. it was first climbed by Albert Ellingwood in the 1930s. It is rated as class 3, but the extremely difficult route finding and length of the climb make this a very challenging endeavor. Much of the climbing is off trail. The climb is 9.5 miles round trip, with 5,900 feet of elevation gain.

== Climate ==
Climate data for La Plata Peak 39.0277 N, 106.4762 W, Elevation: 13,671 ft (4,167 m) (1991–2020 normals)
Month	Jan	Feb	Mar	Apr	May	Jun	Jul	Aug	Sep	Oct	Nov	Dec	Year
Mean daily maximum °F (°C)	21.0 (−6.1)	20.2 (−6.6)	25.6 (−3.6)	31.5 (−0.3)	40.2 (4.6)	51.7 (10.9)	57.5 (14.2)	55.4 (13.0)	49.1 (9.5)	38.5 (3.6)	27.4 (−2.6)	21.1 (−6.1)	36.6 (2.5)
Daily mean °F (°C)	9.5 (−12.5)	8.5 (−13.1)	13.3 (−10.4)	18.5 (−7.5)	27.3 (−2.6)	37.8 (3.2)	43.6 (6.4)	42.1 (5.6)	35.9 (2.2)	26.0 (−3.3)	16.5 (−8.6)	10.1 (−12.2)	24.1 (−4.4)
Mean daily minimum °F (°C)	−1.9 (−18.8)	−3.1 (−19.5)	1.0 (−17.2)	5.6 (−14.7)	14.4 (−9.8)	23.9 (−4.5)	29.8 (−1.2)	28.9 (−1.7)	22.7 (−5.2)	13.6 (−10.2)	5.5 (−14.7)	−1.0 (−18.3)	11.6 (−11.3)
Average precipitation inches (mm)	3.69 (94)	3.64 (92)	3.98 (101)	4.65 (118)	3.53 (90)	1.58 (40)	1.97 (50)	2.11 (54)	2.41 (61)	2.89 (73)	3.58 (91)	3.32 (84)	37.35 (948)
Source: PRISM Climate Group

== See also ==
- List of mountain peaks of North America
  - List of mountain peaks of the United States
    - List of mountain peaks of Colorado
      - List of Colorado fourteeners
