= Garfield Mountain =

Garfield Mountain may refer to:

- Garfield Mountain (Montana), a major summit in the Beaverhead Mountains
- Garfield Mountain (New York)
- Garfield Mountain (Washington)

== See also ==
- Garfield Peak (disambiguation)
- Mount Garfield (disambiguation)
