= Garfield Peak (Colorado) =

Mountain in the state of Colorado

- Location within Colorado

Highest point
- Elevation: 13,787 ft (4,202 m)
- Prominence: 360 ft (110 m)
- Parent peak: Grizzly Peak
- Isolation: 0.83 mi (1.34 km)
- Coordinates: 39°01′50″N 106°35′41″W

Geography
- Location: Continental Divide between Chaffee and Pitkin counties, Colorado, United States
- Parent range: Sawatch Range, Collegiate Peaks
- Topo map(s): USGS 7.5' topographic map Independence Pass, Colorado

Garfield Peak is a high mountain summit of the Collegiate Peaks in the Sawatch Range of the Rocky Mountains of North America. The 13,787-foot (4,202 m) thirteener is located 5.6 miles (9.0 km) south-southwest (bearing 197°) of Independence Pass, Colorado, United States, on the Continental Divide separating San Isabel National Forest and Chaffee County from White River National Forest and Pitkin County. Garfield Peak was named in honor of James A. Garfield, 20th President of the United States.

== See also ==
- List of Colorado mountain ranges
- List of Colorado mountain summits
  - List of Colorado fourteeners
  - List of Colorado 4000 meter prominent summits
  - List of the most prominent summits of Colorado
- List of Colorado county high points
