= Collegiate Peaks =

Group of mountains in Colorado, US

- central Sawatch Range
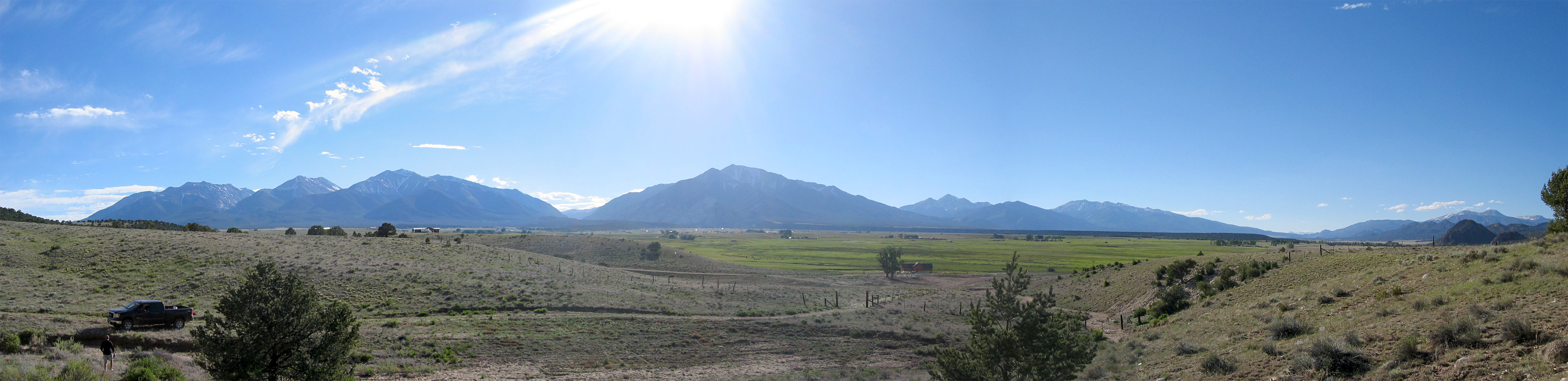
- View of the Collegiate Peaks from near the Arkansas River just south of Chalk Creek.

Highest point
- Peak: Mount Harvard
- Elevation: 14,427 ft (4,397 m)
- Coordinates: 38°55′28″N 106°19′15″W

Dimensions
- Length: 34 mi (55 km) W-E
- Width: 30 mi (48 km) N-S
- Area: 587 mi^{2} (1,520 km^{2})

Geography
- Country: United States
- State: Colorado
- County: Chaffee and Pitkin
- Parent range: Sawatch Range, Rocky Mountains

The Collegiate Peaks (or Collegiate Range) is a name given to a section of the Sawatch Range of the Rocky Mountains located in central Colorado. Drainages to the east include headwaters of the Arkansas River.

The Collegiate Peaks include some of the highest mountains in the Rockies. The section is so named because several of the mountains are named for prominent universities.

In the Arapaho language the Collegiate Peaks were called "hiwoxuu hookuhu'ee" or the Elk's Head.

== Prominent peaks ==
Summits of the Collegiate Peaks With At Least 100 Meters of Topographic Prominence
Rank	Mountain Peak	Elevation	Prominence	Isolation
1	Mount Harvard NGS	14,421 ft 4396 m	2,327 ft 709 m	14.92 mi 24 km
2	La Plata Peak	14,343 ft 4372 m	1,841 ft 561 m	6.28 mi 10.1 km
3	Mount Belford NGS	14,204 ft 4329 m	1,317 ft 401 m	3.3 mi 5.31 km
4	Mount Princeton NGS	14,204 ft 4329 m	2,156 ft 657 m	–
5	Mount Yale NGS	14,202 ft 4329 m	1,876 ft 572 m	5.55 mi 8.93 km
6	Mount Oxford NGS	14,160 ft 4316 m	633 ft 193 m	1.22 mi 1.97 km
7	Mount Columbia NGS	14,079 ft 4291 m	873 ft 266 m	1.9 mi 3.05 km
8	Missouri Mountain NGS	14,074 ft 4290 m	827 ft 252 m	1.31 mi 2.11 km
9	Huron Peak NGS	14,012 ft 4271 m	1,403 ft 428 m	3.21 mi 5.16 km
10	Grizzly Peak NGS	13,995 ft 4266 m	1,908 ft 582 m	6.77 mi 10.89 km
11	Ice Mountain PB	13,958 ft 4254 m	991 ft 302 m	2.11 mi 3.39 km
12	Mount Hope PB	13,939 ft 4249 m	853 ft 260 m	2.91 mi 4.68 km
13	Emerald Peak PB	13,911 ft 4240 m	544 ft 166 m	1.3 mi 2.09 km
14	North Apostle PB	13,847 ft 4220 m	360 ft 110 m	0.37 mi 0.59 km
15	Rinker Peak PB	13,789 ft 4203 m	903 ft 275 m	1.53 mi 2.46 km
16	Peak 13,762 (Silver King Peak) PB	13,769 ft 4197 m	822 ft 251 m	1.69 mi 2.72 km
17	Garfield Peak PB	13,767 ft 4196 m	340 ft 104 m	0.83 mi 1.34 km
18	Sayres Benchmark NGS PB	13,745 ft 4189 m	958 ft 292 m	1.92 mi 3.09 km
19	Turner Peak PB	13,233 ft 4033 m	1,157 ft 353 m	3.88 mi 6.24 km
20	Sewanee Peak	13,132 ft 4003 m	538 ft 164 m	0.73 mi 1.18 km

== See also ==
- Mountain peaks of Colorado
- Collegiate Peaks Wilderness
