= Peak 13,762 (Silver King Peak) =

Mountain in Colorado, United States

Silver King Peak
- Peak 13762
- Location within Colorado

Highest point
- Elevation: 13,769 ft (4,197 m)
- Prominence: 822 ft (251 m)
- Isolation: 1.69 mi (2.72 km)
- Coordinates: 38°54′25″N 106°22′03″W

Geography
- Location: Continental Divide between Chaffee and Gunnison counties, Colorado, United States
- Parent range: Sawatch Range, Collegiate Peaks
- Topo map(s): USGS 7.5' topographic map Mount Harvard, Colorado

The unnamed summit variously known as Peak 13762 or Silver King Peak lies within the Sawatch Range of the Colorado Rockies. Its remoteness and the fact that it is surrounded by several 14,000 foot peaks means that it is rarely climbed.

== Directions ==
The Pine Creek Trailhead lies at 8,800 feet. From US 24, 6.3 miles south of the U.S.24-CO 82 intersection, turn onto Chaffee County 388. Continue straight at 0.3 miles and around a sharp turn at 0.6 miles where the road gets a bit rougher. Low clearance cars might want to park here, while others may continue up the last tenth of a mile to the trailhead. The trailhead lies on the boundary of the private Pine Creek Ranch.

== See also ==
- List of Colorado mountain ranges
- List of Colorado mountain summits
  - List of Colorado fourteeners
  - List of Colorado 4000 meter prominent summits
  - List of the most prominent summits of Colorado
- List of Colorado county high points
