= Garfield Peak (Wyoming) =

Mountain in Wyoming, United States

Highest point
- Elevation: 8,244 ft (2,513 m)
- Coordinates: 42°46′57″N 107°15′51″W

Geography
- Location: Natrona County, Wyoming, U.S.
- Parent range: Rattlesnake Range
- Topo map: USGS Garfield Peak

Climbing
- Easiest route: no public access

Garfield Peak is a prominent mountain in the U.S. state of Wyoming. It is the highest point in the Rattlesnake Hills.
