= Mount Princeton =

Mountain in Colorado, United States

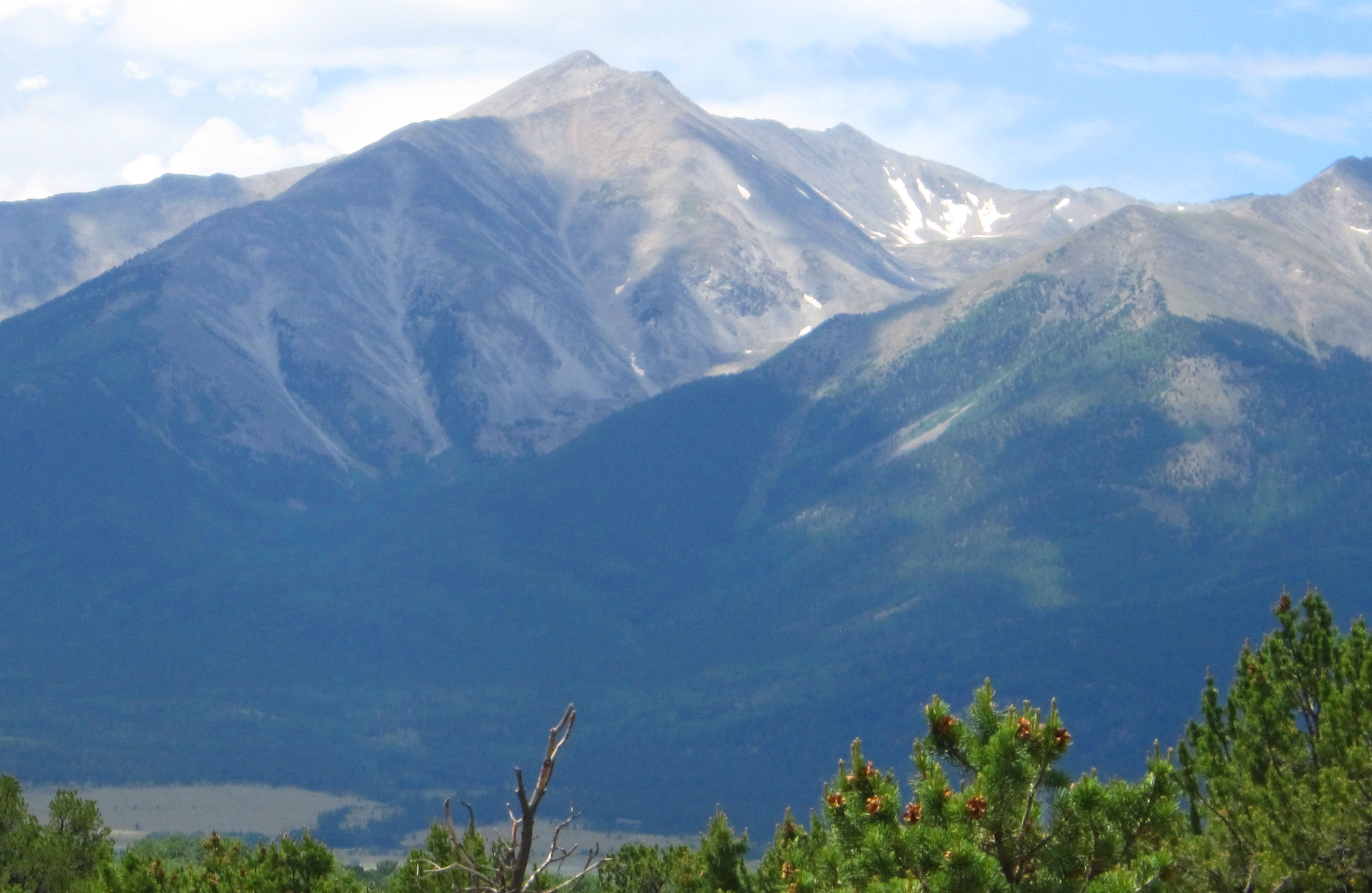
- Mt. Princeton from near Buena Vista

Highest point
- Elevation: 14,200.1 ft (4,328.2 m); NAPGD2022
- Prominence: 2177 ft (664 m)
- Isolation: 5.19 mi (8.36 km)
- Listing: North America highest peaks 46th; US highest major peaks 32nd; Colorado highest major peaks 15th; Colorado fourteeners 18th
- Coordinates: 38°44′57″N 106°14′33″W

Geography
- Location within Colorado
- Location: Chaffee County, Colorado, U.S.
- Parent range: Sawatch Range, Collegiate Peaks
- Topo map(s): USGS 7.5' topographic map Mount Antero, Colorado

Climbing
- Easiest route: East Slopes: Hike, class 2

Mount Princeton is a high and prominent mountain summit of the Collegiate Peaks in the Sawatch Range of the Rocky Mountains of North America. The 14,200.1 feet (4,328 m) fourteener is located in San Isabel National Forest, 7.8 miles (12.6 km) southwest (bearing 225°) of the Town of Buena Vista in Chaffee County, Colorado, United States. The mountain was named in honor of Princeton University.

== Mountain ==
While not one of the highest peaks of the Sawatch Range, Mount Princeton is one of the most dramatic, abruptly rising nearly 7,000 ft (2,134 m) above the Arkansas River valley in only 6 miles.

=== Climbing ===
The first recorded ascent was on July 17, 1877, at 12:30 pm by William Libbey of Princeton University. It is likely that various miners had climbed the peak earlier. The name Mount Princeton was in use as early as 1873, and the peak was most likely named by Henry Gannett, a Harvard graduate and chief topographer in a government survey led by George M. Wheeler.

The standard route to the top is rated class 2.

== Climate ==
Climate data for Mount Princeton 38.7491 N, 106.2407 W, Elevation: 13,684 ft (4,171 m) (1991–2020 normals)
Month	Jan	Feb	Mar	Apr	May	Jun	Jul	Aug	Sep	Oct	Nov	Dec	Year
Mean daily maximum °F (°C)	22.2 (−5.4)	21.6 (−5.8)	26.4 (−3.1)	31.4 (−0.3)	40.3 (4.6)	52.1 (11.2)	57.3 (14.1)	55.3 (12.9)	49.2 (9.6)	39.1 (3.9)	28.7 (−1.8)	22.5 (−5.3)	37.2 (2.9)
Daily mean °F (°C)	10.3 (−12.1)	9.5 (−12.5)	13.8 (−10.1)	18.5 (−7.5)	27.2 (−2.7)	37.8 (3.2)	43.2 (6.2)	41.8 (5.4)	35.8 (2.1)	26.4 (−3.1)	17.4 (−8.1)	11.0 (−11.7)	24.4 (−4.2)
Mean daily minimum °F (°C)	−1.5 (−18.6)	−2.7 (−19.3)	1.2 (−17.1)	5.5 (−14.7)	14.1 (−9.9)	23.4 (−4.8)	29.0 (−1.7)	28.3 (−2.1)	22.4 (−5.3)	13.7 (−10.2)	6.0 (−14.4)	−0.5 (−18.1)	11.6 (−11.4)
Average precipitation inches (mm)	3.95 (100)	3.98 (101)	3.44 (87)	3.98 (101)	2.44 (62)	1.20 (30)	2.82 (72)	3.24 (82)	2.23 (57)	2.43 (62)	3.30 (84)	3.04 (77)	36.05 (915)
Source: PRISM Climate Group

== Historical names ==
- Chalk Peak
- Mount Princeton – 1906
- Princeton Mountain

== See also ==
- List of mountain peaks of North America
  - List of mountain peaks of the United States
    - List of mountain peaks of Colorado
      - List of Colorado fourteeners
