= Collegiate Peaks Wilderness =

Protected area in central Colorado, US

- IUCN category Ib (wilderness area)
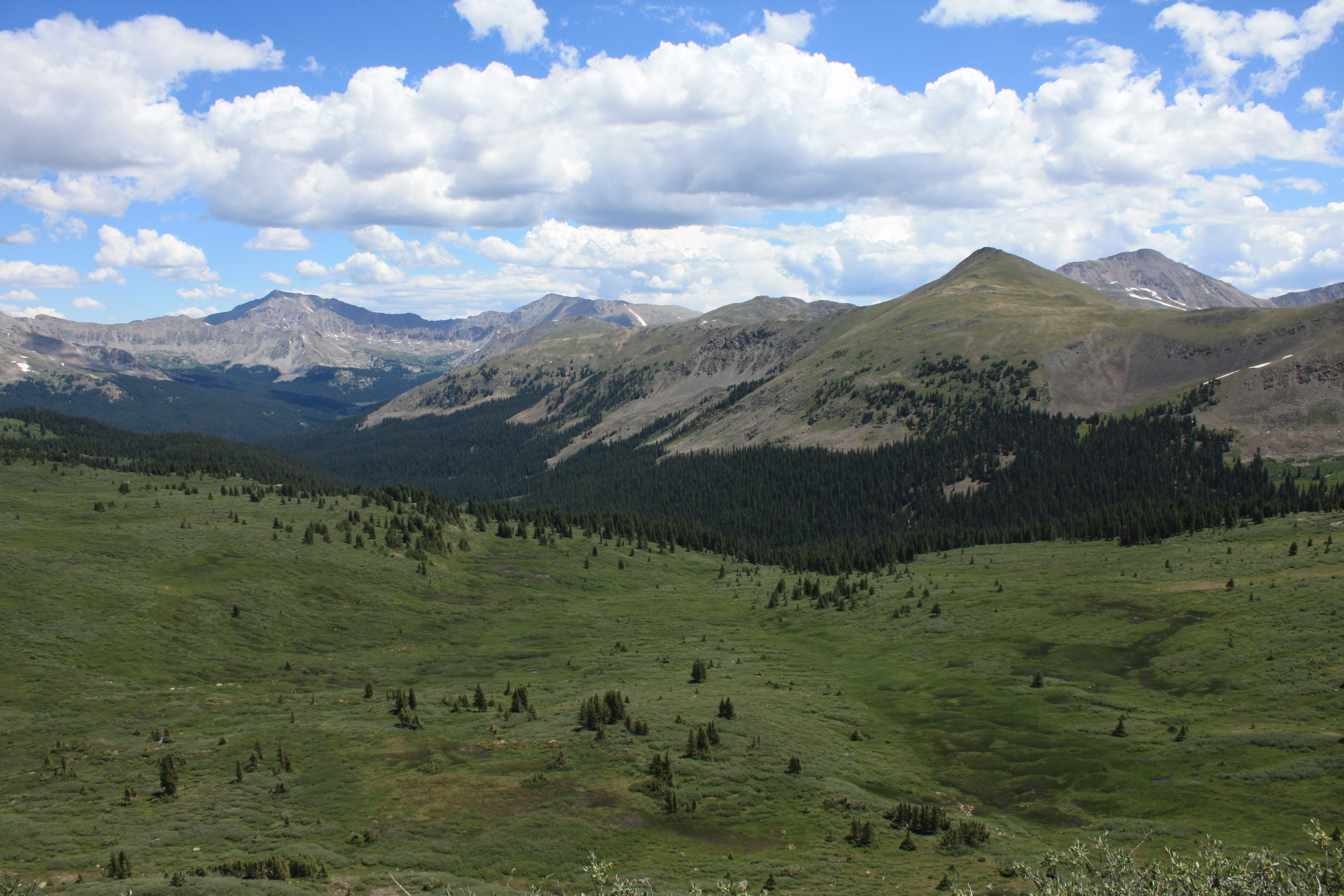
- Collegiate Peaks Wilderness, July 2011

- Location within the United States
- Location: Colorado, United States
- Nearest city: Colorado Springs, CO
- Coordinates: 38°58′10″N 106°29′34″W
- Area: 167,414 acres (677.50 km^{2})
- Established: January 1, 1980
- Governing body: U.S. Forest Service

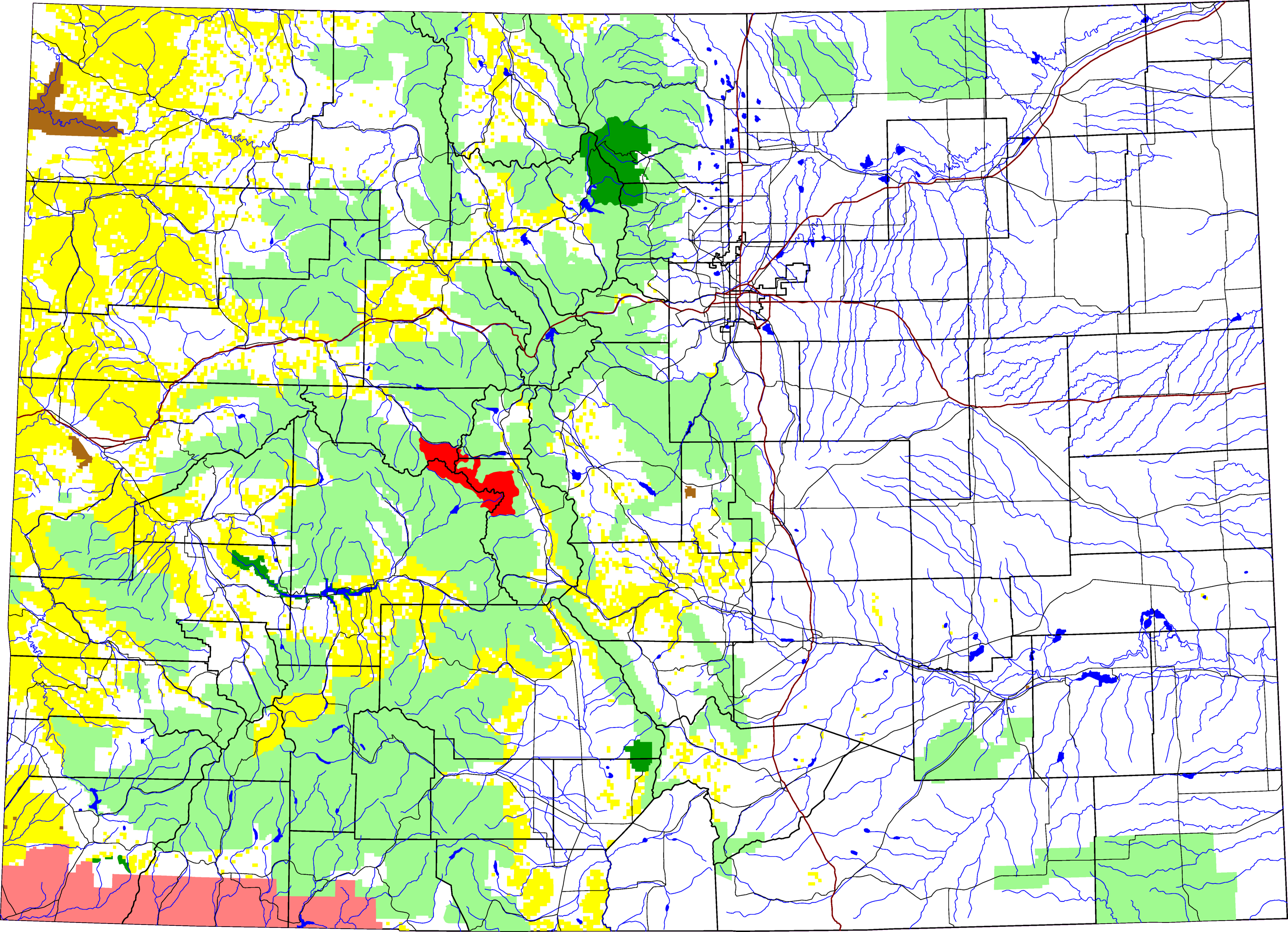
Colorado with Collegiate Peaks Wilderness in red

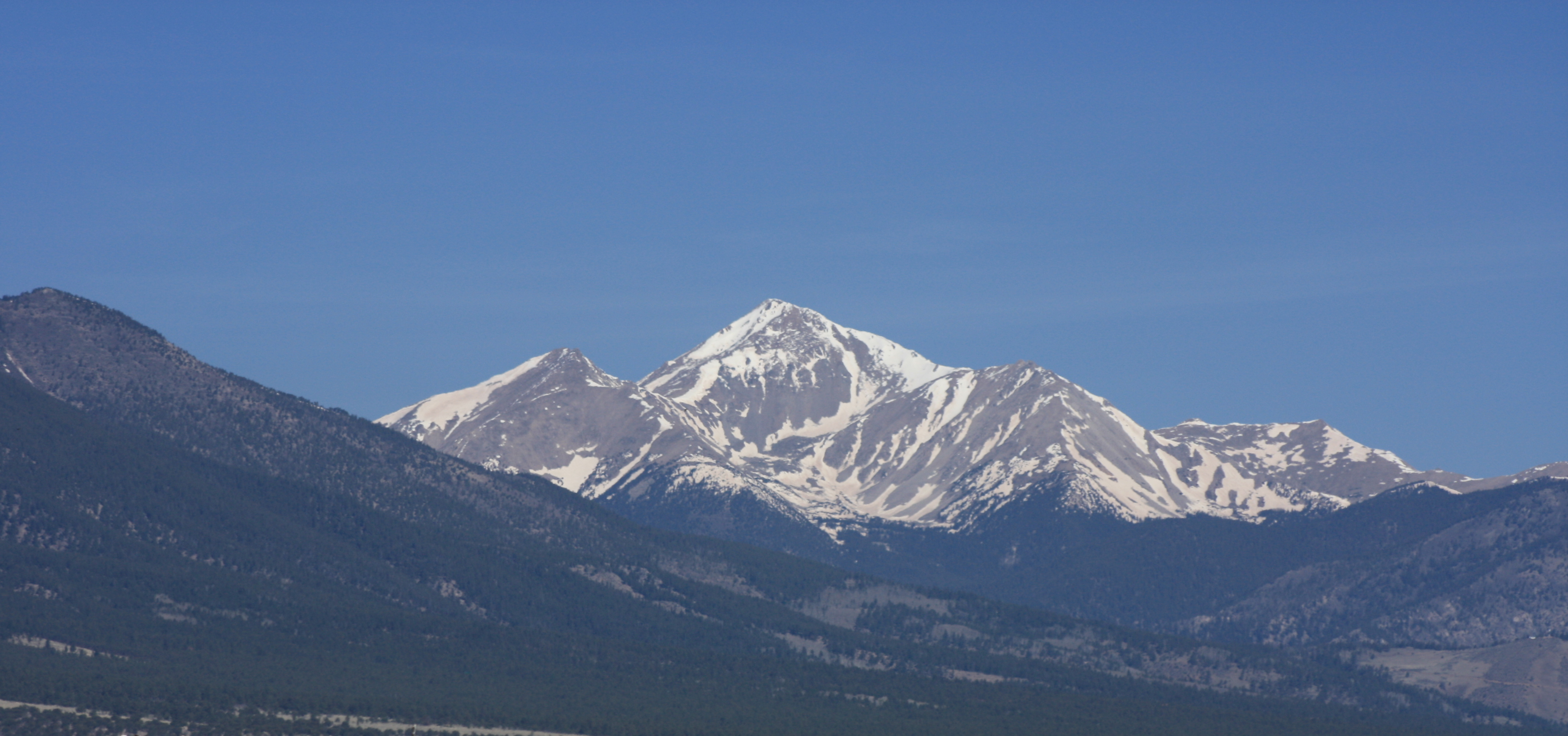
Mount Yale from U.S. 285. May 2009

The Collegiate Peaks Wilderness is a 168,000-acre (680 km^{2}) area located in central Colorado between Leadville and Buena Vista to the east and Aspen to the west and Crested Butte to the southwest. Most of the area is in the San Isabel and Gunnison National Forests, with a smaller area in the White River National Forest southeast of Aspen. Most of the area is in northwest Chaffee County with smaller portions in Gunnison, Pitkin, and Lake counties.

== Geography ==
The Collegiate Peaks area includes much of the Sawatch Range and has the highest average elevation of any wilderness area in the United States. Five of the area's 14,000-foot (4,300 m) peaks are named for famous universities and colleges, including Mt. Harvard, Mt. Oxford, Mt. Yale, Mt. Princeton and Mt. Columbia. These peaks are the source of the name for the wilderness area, which includes them all but Mt. Princeton. Other fourteeners in the area include La Plata Peak, Mount Belford, Huron Peak, and Missouri Mountain. The Collegiate Peaks also includes several notable 13,000-foot (4,000 m) peaks including the Three Apostles, a chain of three mountains about six miles (10 km) south of the ghost town of Winfield. The middle peak of the Three Apostles is also referred to as Ice Mountain and is generally recognized as one of the most difficult peaks to climb in the Sawatch Range. Notably, the Collegiate Peaks also has two peaks named Grizzly Peak. One is south of Independence Pass at 13,988, and the other is north of Taylor Reservoir on the Continental Divide at 13,281.

The area is an important watershed for three rivers on both sides of the Continental Divide: the upper Arkansas River, the Gunnison River, and the Roaring Fork River. There are numerous alpine creeks in the area's wide valleys and these are all quite marshy. Snow does not usually begin to melt until May or June and it remains year-round in places on some of the high peaks.

Both the Continental Divide Trail and the Colorado Trail cross the area. The Continental Divide Trail follows the course of the Continental Divide itself with several side spurs. The Colorado Trail passes through the lower eastern portion of the area and crosses Pine Creek, Frenchman Creek and Three Elk Creek all of which drain into the Arkansas River north of Buena Vista.

== History ==
In earlier times the area was inhabited by various people. There are groves of old growth Ponderosa Pine on the eastern side which bear evidence of stripping by bands of native Utes who inhabited the area and used the bark from living trees for clothing and food. The area is also dotted with the evidence of mining operations from the last century. In the Pine Creek valley - one of the central valleys between Mounts Oxford, Belford and Missouri to the north and Mt. Harvard and Columbia to the south, there is evidence of an earlier settlement on both sides of the stream comprising four cabins and a horse corral. South of the town of Winfield are the spare remains of the town of Harrison at the base of Mt. Huron.

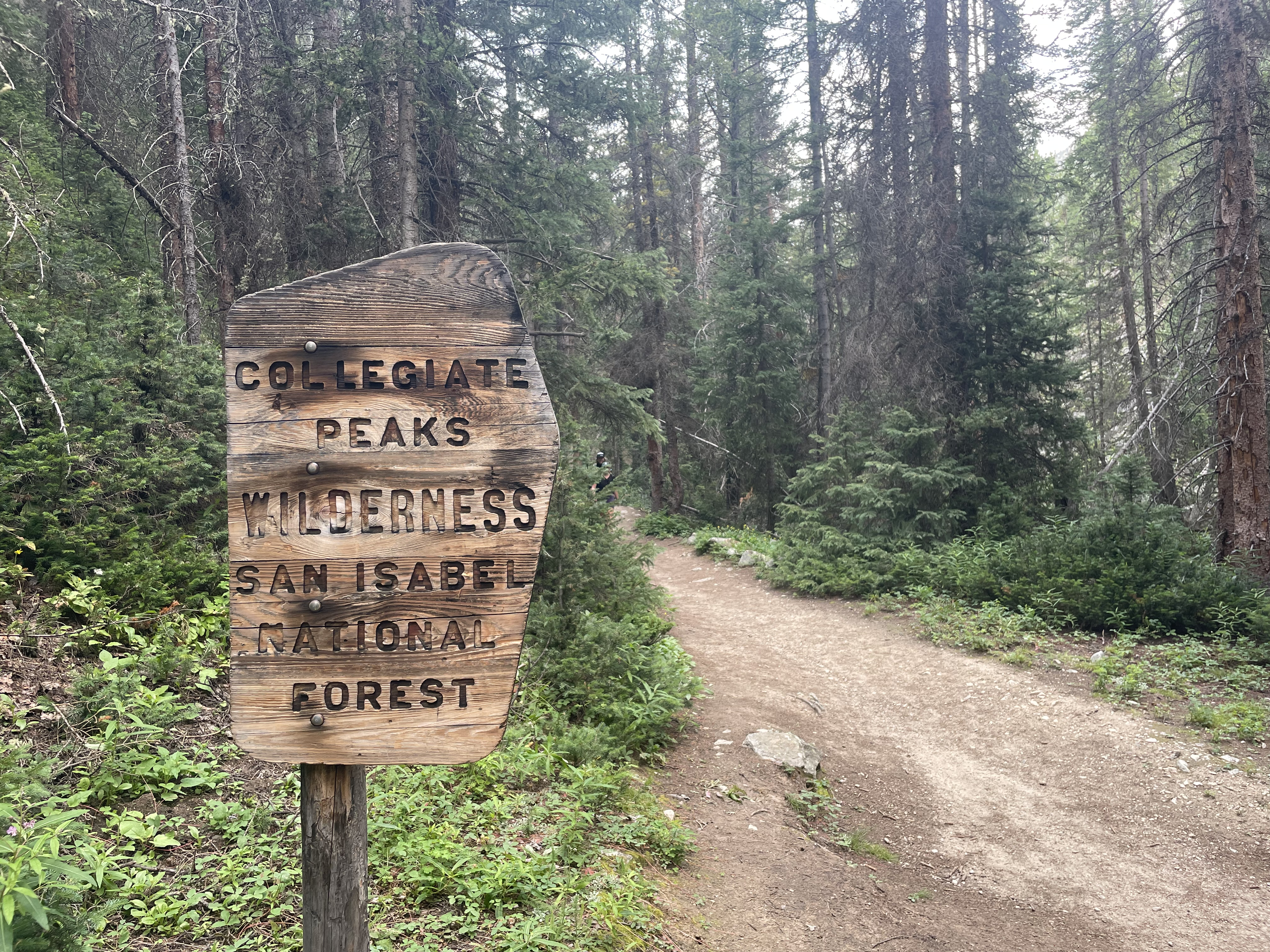
Collegiate Peaks Wilderness sign

The Collegiate Peaks borders several other Colorado wilderness areas including: Buffalo Peaks, Maroon Bells-Snowmass, Hunter-Fryingpan, and Mount Massive. It was designated by congress as a wilderness area in 1980 in accordance with the provisions of the Wilderness Act of 1964.

== Regulations/Prohibitions ==
- Having more than 15 persons in any one group.
- Having more than a combination of 25 people and pack or saddle animals in any one stock group.
- Possessing dogs, except for working stock dogs, or dogs used for legal hunting purposes, unless under physical restraint of a leash.
- Camping within one hundred feet of developed trails.
- Building, maintaining, attending, or using a campfire, within 100 feet of lakes, streams and forest development trails.
- Hitching, hobbling or tethering any pack or saddle animal within one hundred (100) feet of lakes, streams and forest development trails.
- Short-cutting a switchback on a forest development trail.
