= San Isabel National Forest =

Forest in Colorado, US

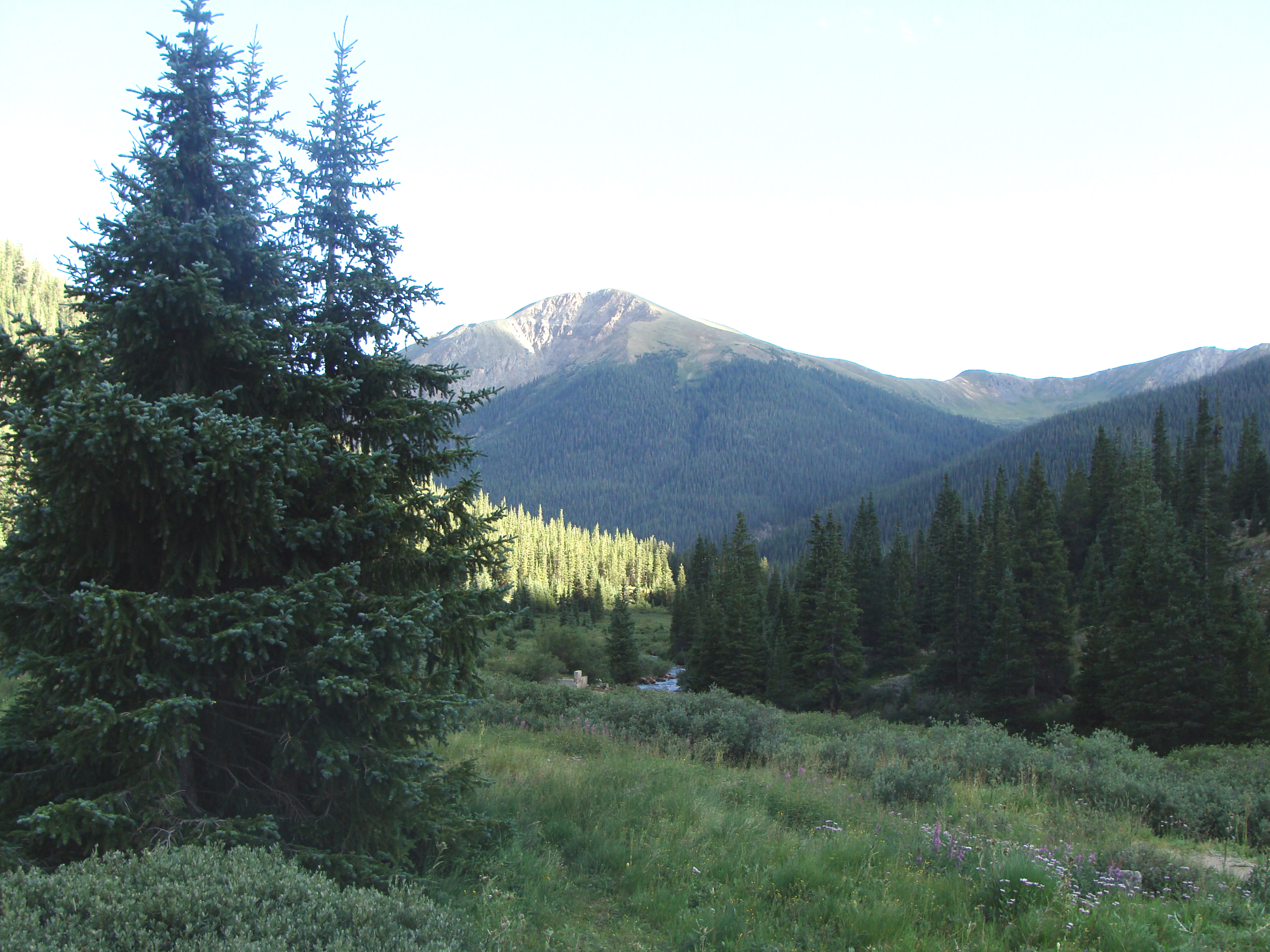

- Location within the United States
- Location: Colorado, United States
- Nearest city: Pueblo, CO
- Coordinates: 38°02′38″N 105°06′32″W
- Area: 1,120,233 acres (4,533.42 km^{2})
- Established: April 11, 1902
- Governing body: U.S. Forest Service
- Website: Pike and San Isabel National Forests & Cimarron and Comanche National Grasslands

San Isabel National Forest is located in central Colorado. The forest contains 19 of the state's 53 fourteeners, peaks over 14,000 feet (4,267 m) high, including Mount Elbert, the highest point in Colorado.

It is one of eleven national forests in the state of Colorado and contains the Sawatch Range, the Collegiate Peaks, and Sangre de Cristo Range. It has a total area of 1,120,233 acres (1,750.364 sq mi; 4,533.42 km^{2}) spread out over parts of eleven counties in central Colorado. In descending order of land area it is located in Chaffee, Custer, Lake, Huerfano, Fremont, Pueblo, Saguache, Las Animas, Park, Costilla, and Summit counties.

San Isabel National Forest is co-managed by the Forest Service together with Pike National Forest, Cimarron National Grassland, and Comanche National Grassland from offices in Pueblo. There are local ranger district offices located in Cañon City, Leadville, and Salida.

== Wilderness areas ==
There are seven officially designated wilderness areas lying within San Isabel National Forest that are part of the National Wilderness Preservation System. Four of them extend into neighboring National Forests, and of these, one also onto land under management of the National Park Service. Another one extends onto land of the United States Fish and Wildlife Service (as indicated).

- Buffalo Peaks Wilderness (mostly in Pike NF)
- Collegiate Peaks Wilderness (partly in Gunnison NF; partly in White River NF)
- Greenhorn Mountain Wilderness
- Holy Cross Wilderness (mostly in White River NF)
- Mount Massive Wilderness (partly in Leadville National Fish Hatchery)
- Sangre de Cristo Wilderness (partly in Rio Grande NF; partly in Great Sand Dunes National Park)
- Spanish Peaks Wilderness

== See also ==
- List of national forests of the United States
