= Original Monarch Pass =

Mountain pass in Colorado, USA

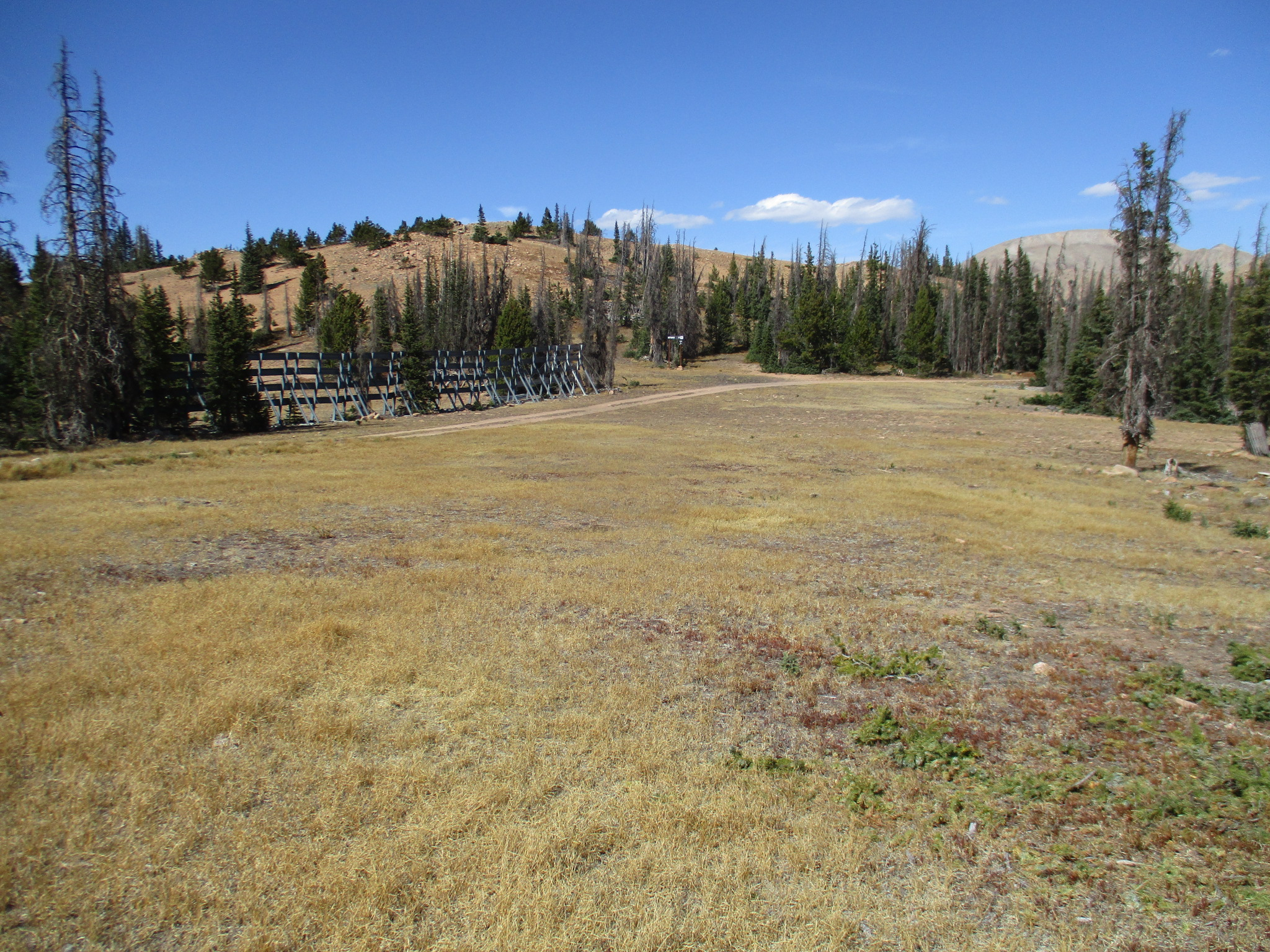
- Original Monarch Pass viewed from the south
- Interactive map of Original Monarch Pass
- Elevation: 11,532 ft (3,515 m)
- Traversed by: abandoned wagon road

Third Approach
- Location: Gunnison and Chaffee counties, Colorado, United States
- Range: Sawatch Range
- Coordinates: 38°30′41″N 106°20′49″W
- Topo map: USGS Garfield

Original Monarch Pass (elevation 11,532 feet (3,515 m)) is a mountain pass on the border of Gunnison and Chaffee counties of west-central Colorado. It is located on the Continental Divide on the western boundary of Monarch Ski Area, 1 mile (1.6 km) west of U.S. Route 50. Original Monarch Pass divides the watersheds of No Name Creek, a tributary of Tomichi Creek and the Gunnison River, to the west and the South Arkansas River to the east. The name Monarch comes from nearby Monarch Ridge and the community of Monarch.

Original Monarch Pass has also been referred to as Old Old Monarch Pass.

== History ==
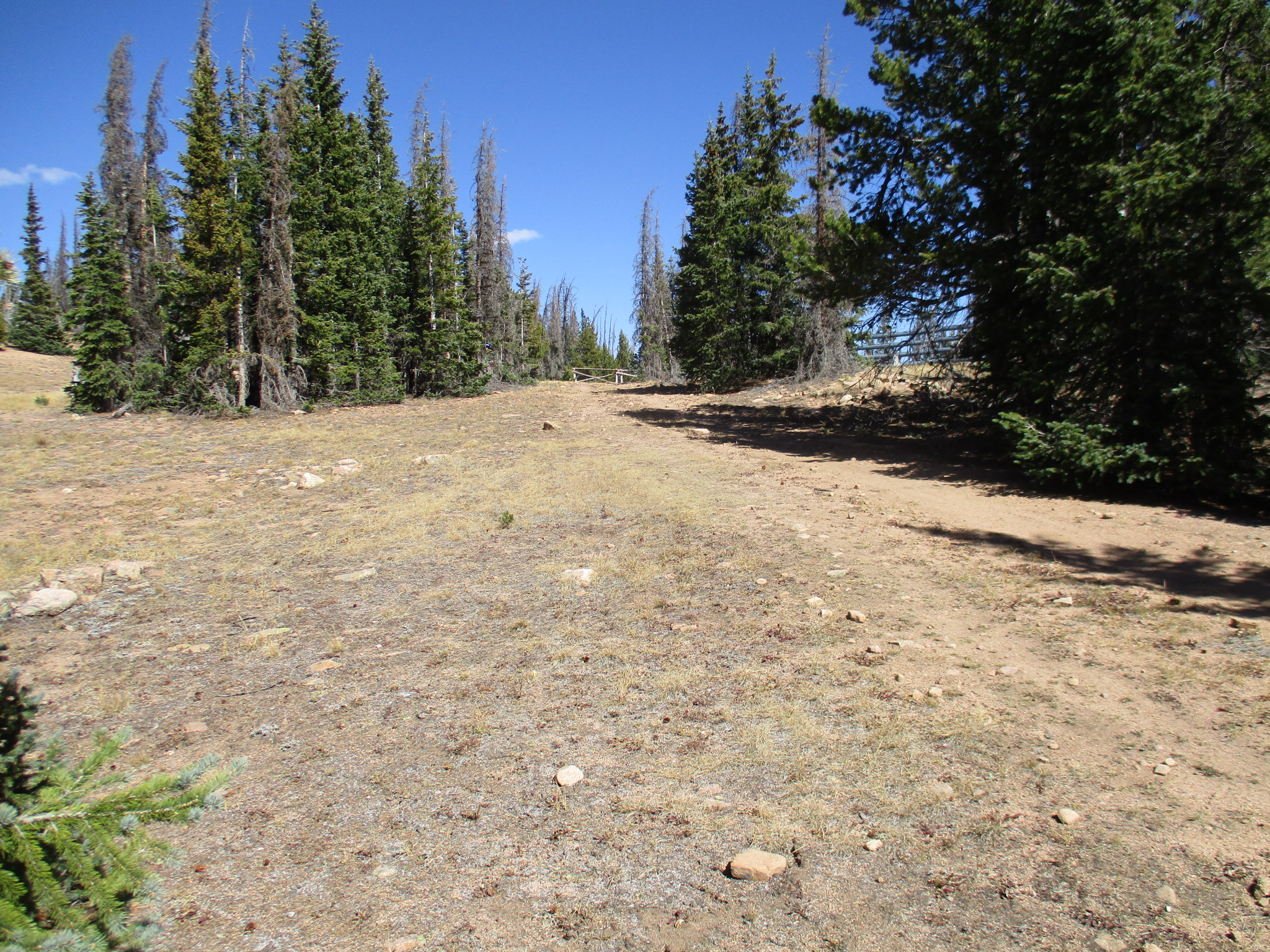
Original Monarch Pass viewed from the wagon road on the west side. The fence and gate at the summit mark the boundary of the ski area.

In 1880, a toll road was constructed over this first Monarch Pass. The new road became an important route for wagons and stagecoaches traveling from the town of South Arkansas (later named Salida) on the east side to the booming mining camps on the west side of the divide. The road also allowed travel on to the growing city of Gunnison and points farther west. The pass later accommodated motor vehicles, and remained an important crossing of the divide until 1922, when the state highway department realigned the road to cross the divide at a slightly lower point 1.1 miles (1.8 km) to the southeast. This second Monarch Pass is now known as Old Monarch Pass. In 1939, yet another highway realignment moved the crossing of the divide another 0.6 miles (0.97 km) southeast to the current location where U. S. Route 50 crosses today. This third pass is now known as Monarch Pass.

Today Original Monarch Pass can be reached by hiking north along the Continental Divide Trail from Old Monarch Pass. It can also be reached by hiking up the abandoned toll road from the west. The old toll road on the east side of the pass is now used as a service road within the Monarch Ski Area and is not accessible to the public.
