= Old Monarch Pass =

Mountain pass in Colorado, USA

- Interactive map of Old Monarch Pass
- Elevation: 11,365 ft (3,464 m)
- Traversed by: Forest Road 237

Third Approach
- Location: Gunnison and Chaffee counties, Colorado, United States
- Range: Sawatch Range
- Coordinates: 38°29′48″N 106°20′17″W
- Topo map: USGS Pahlone

Old Monarch Pass (elevation 11,365 feet (3,464 m)) is a mountain pass on the border of Gunnison and Chaffee counties of west-central Colorado. It is located on the Continental Divide 0.6 miles (0.97 km) northwest of the current Monarch Pass where U.S. Route 50 crosses the divide. Old Monarch Pass divides the watersheds of Porphyry Creek, a tributary of Tomichi Creek and the Gunnison River, to the west and the South Arkansas River to the east. The name "Monarch" comes from nearby Monarch Ridge and the community of Monarch.

== History ==
A road crossing the Original Monarch Pass was constructed 1880 and served as an important wagon and stage road connecting the town of South Arkansas (later named Salida) on the east side to mining camps and the city of Gunnison on the west side. In 1922, the road was improved and rerouted to better accommodate motor vehicles. The new road crossed the divide at a lower saddle 1.1 miles (1.8 km) to the southeast. This second Monarch Pass is what is now known as Old Monarch Pass. It remained an important unpaved crossing of the divide until 1939 when another highway realignment moved the crossing yet further southeast 0.6 miles (0.97 km) to the third and current Monarch Pass where U. S. Route 50 crosses today.

Today Old Monarch Pass is traversed by Forest Road 237, a gravel road open to vehicular traffic during the summer months. During the winter, the road is not plowed but the pass can be reached by skiers and snowmobilers.
