= Garfield, Colorado =

Census-designated place in Chaffee County, CO, USA

- Census-designated place
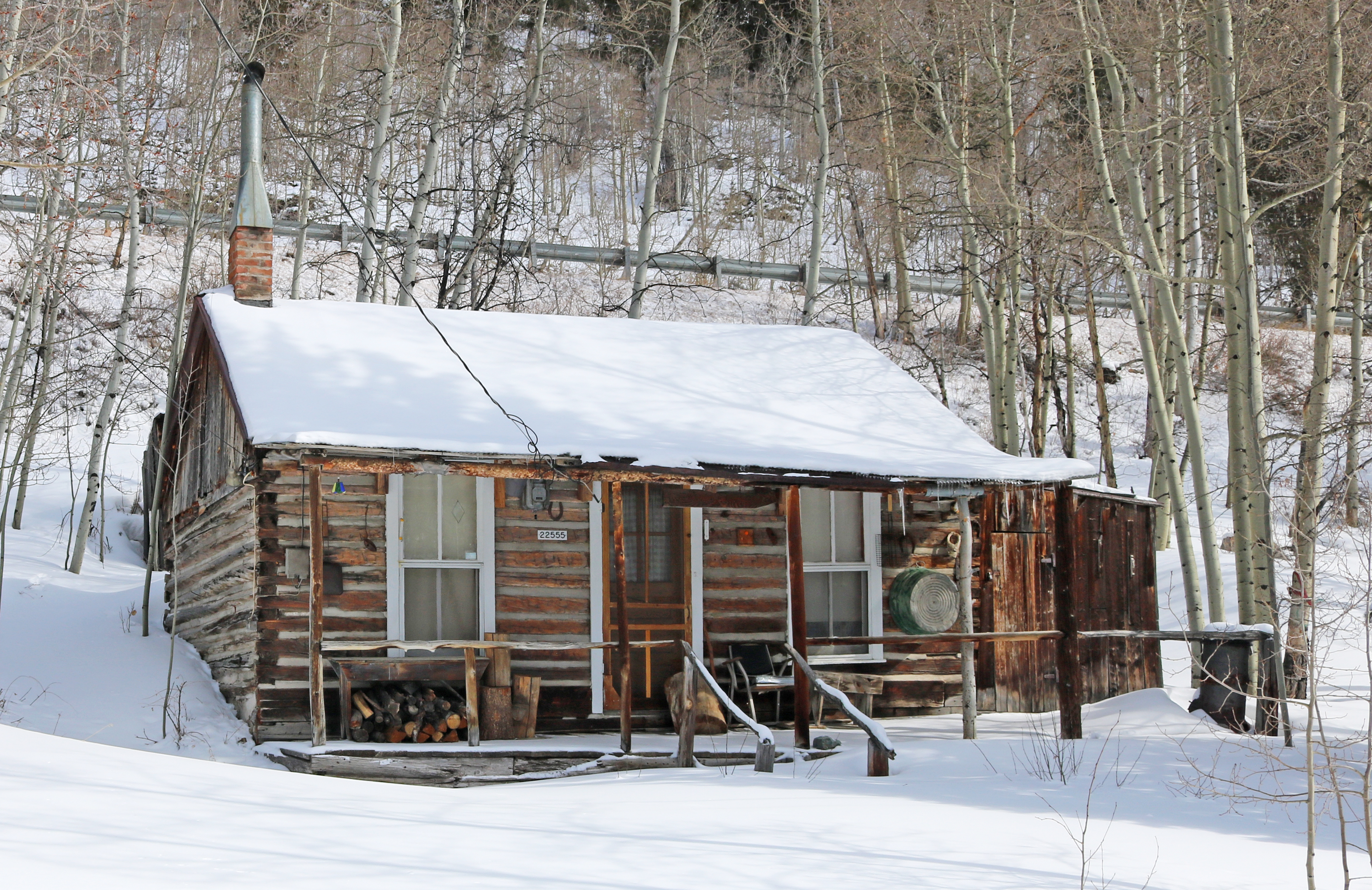
- The Gimlett/LeFevre Cabin in Garfield, Colorado.

- Location of the Garfield CDP in Chaffee County, Colorado
- Coordinates: 38°32′57″N 106°17′21″W
- Country: United States
- State: Colorado
- County: Chaffee

Government
  - Type: Unincorporated community

Area
  - Total: 0.341 sq mi (0.883 km^{2})
  - Land: 0.341 sq mi (0.883 km^{2})
  - Water: 0 sq mi (0.000 km^{2})
- Elevation: 9,518 ft (2,901 m)

Population (2020)
  - Total: 27
  - Density: 79/sq mi (31/km^{2})
- Time zone: UTC-7 (MST)
  - Summer (DST): UTC-6 (MDT)
- ZIP Code: Salida 81201
- Area code: 719
- GNIS feature ID: 2583238

Garfield is an unincorporated community and a census-designated place (CDP) located in and governed by Chaffee County, Colorado, United States. The population of the Garfield CDP was 27 at the United States Census 2020. The Salida post office (ZIP Code 81201) serves the area.

== Geography ==
The Garfield CDP has an area of 218 acres (0.883 km^{2}), all land.

== Demographics ==
The United States Census Bureau initially defined the Garfield CDP for the United States Census 2010.

Garfield CDP, Colorado
Year	Pop.	±%
2010	15	—
2020	27	+80.0%
Source: United States Census Bureau

== Attractions ==
- Monarch Mountain ski and snowboard area
- Monarch Pass
- San Isabel National Forest

== See also ==
- San Isabel National Forest
  - Monarch Ski Area
