= Mount Aetna (Colorado) =

Mountain in the American state of Colorado

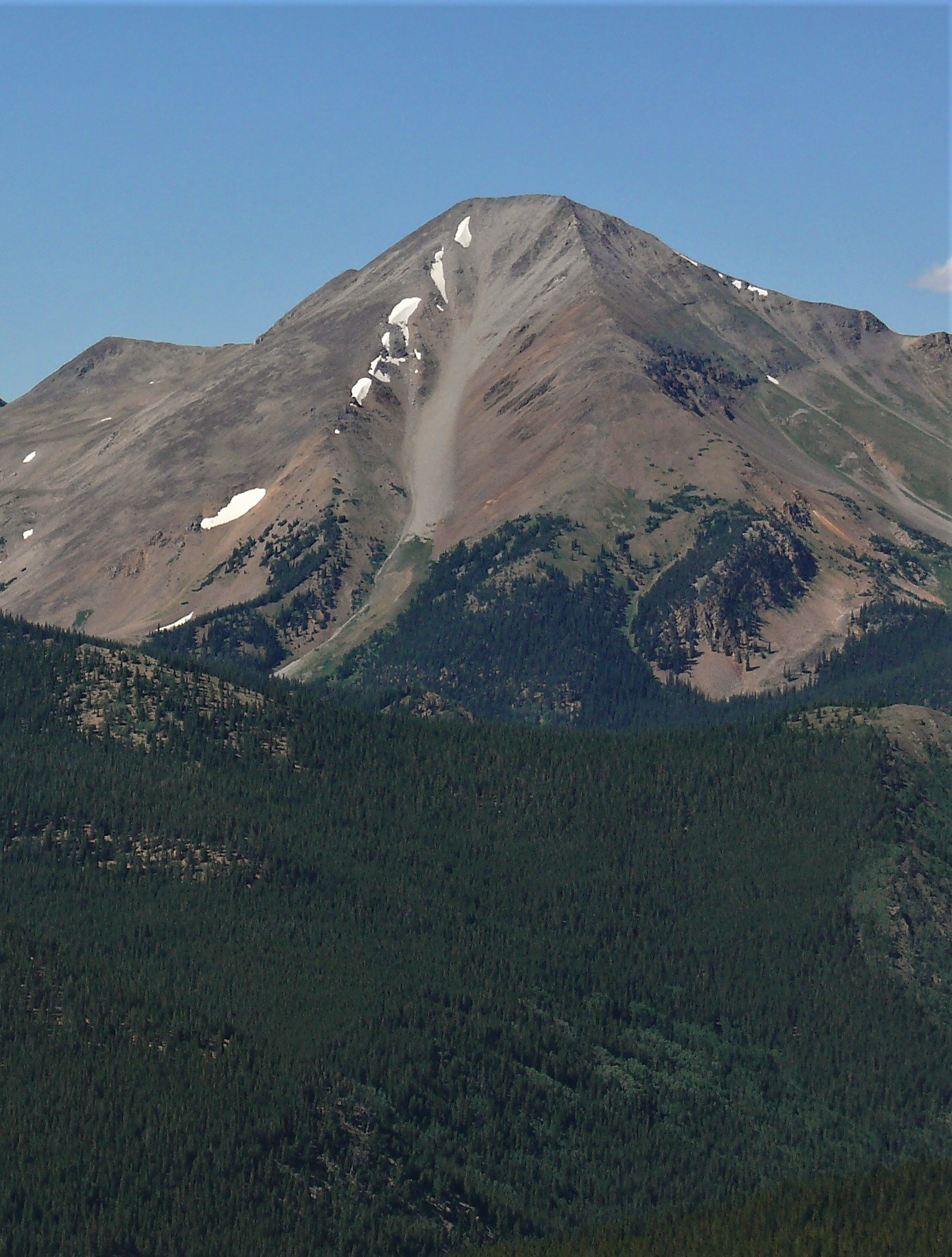
- South aspect

Highest point
- Elevation: 13,745 ft (4,189 m)
- Prominence: 1,225 ft (373 m)
- Parent peak: Mount Antero (14,276 ft)
- Isolation: 4.15 mi (6.68 km)
- Coordinates: 38°35′11″N 106°19′14″W

Geography
- Location within Colorado Location within the United States
- Country: United States
- State: Colorado
- County: Chaffee County
- Protected area: San Isabel National Forest
- Parent range: Rocky Mountains; Sawatch Range
- Topo map: USGS Garfield

Geology
- Rock age: Tertiary
- Rock type: Quartz Monzonite Porphyry

Climbing
- Easiest route: class 2 hiking

Mount Aetna is a 13,745-foot (4,189 m) mountain summit in Chaffee County, Colorado, United States.

== Description ==
Mount Aetna is set 1.5 miles (2.4 km) east of the Continental Divide in the Sawatch Range which is a subrange of the Rocky Mountains. The prominent mountain is located 19 miles (31 km) west of the community of Salida on land managed by San Isabel National Forest. It ranks as the 129th-highest peak in Colorado. Precipitation runoff from the mountain's slopes drains to the South Arkansas River. Topographic relief is significant as the summit rises 2,750 feet (838 m) above the river's Middle Fork in one mile (1.6 km). An ascent of the peak involves hiking nine miles (14 km) with 4,800 feet (1,463 m) of elevation gain. Mount Aetna can be seen from Highway 50 at Monarch Pass.

== Etymology ==
The mountain is named for its symmetrical profile resemblance to Mount Etna, the famous volcano in Sicily. A visually prominent talus gully on the south slope of the mountain creates an illusion of lava flowing down this pseudo-volcanic peak. The mountain's toponym has been officially adopted by the United States Board on Geographic Names, and has been featured in publications since at least 1910, if not earlier.

== Climate ==
According to the Köppen climate classification system, Mt. Aetna is located in an alpine subarctic climate zone with cold, snowy winters, and cool to warm summers. Due to its altitude, it receives precipitation all year, as snow in winter, and as thunderstorms in summer, with a dry period in late spring.

== See also ==
- List of mountain peaks of Colorado
- Thirteener

== Gallery ==
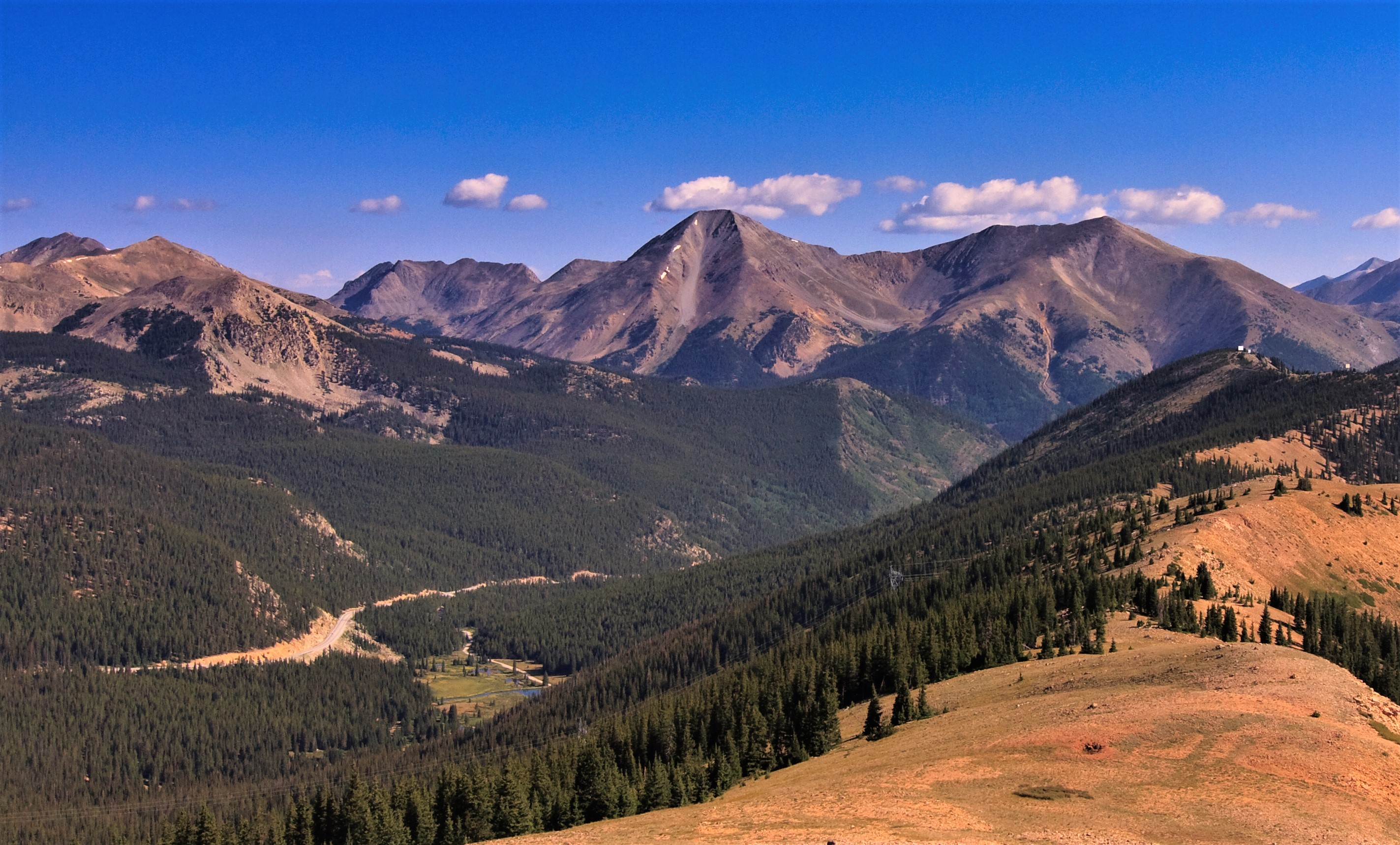
South aspect of Mt. Aetna (center) and Taylor Mountain from Monarch Ridge

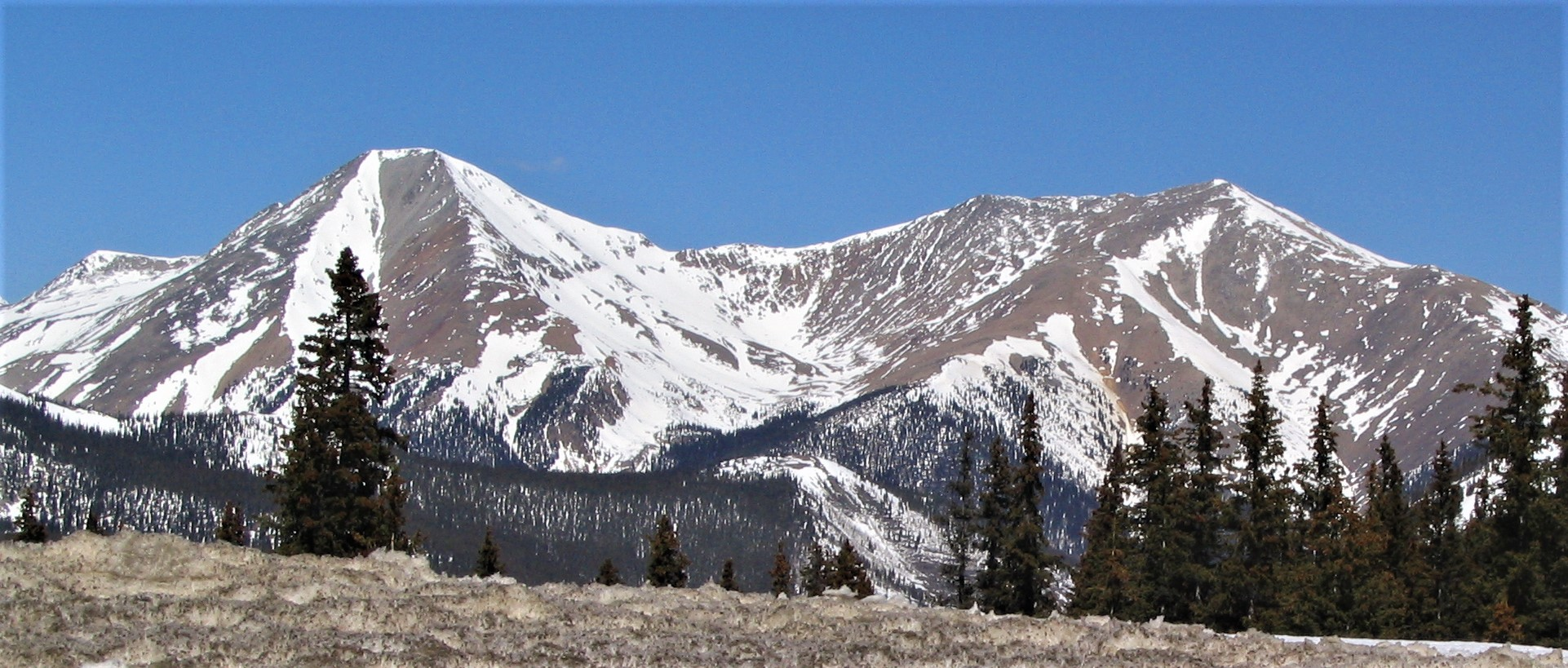
South aspect of Mt. Aetna (left) and Taylor Mountain from Monarch Pass

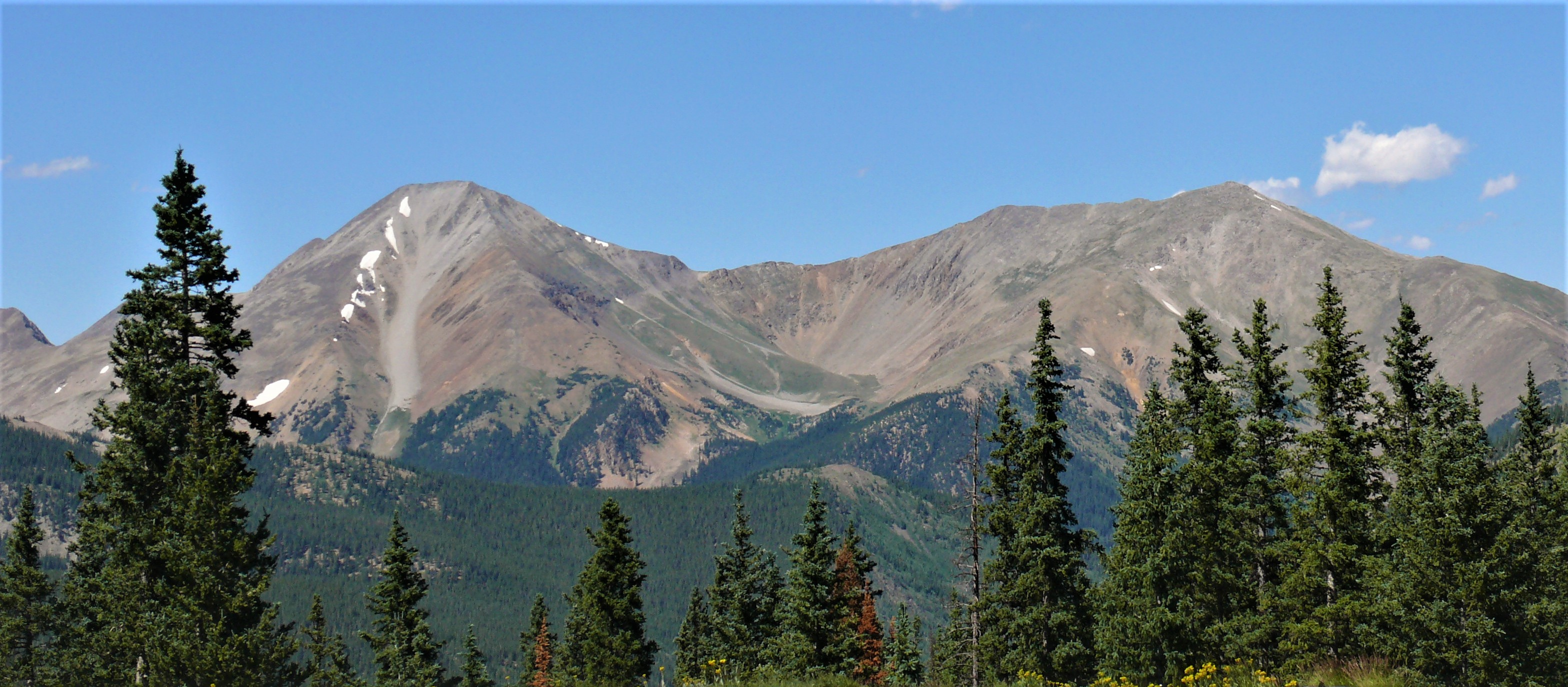
Mt. Aetna (left) and Taylor Mountain (right)

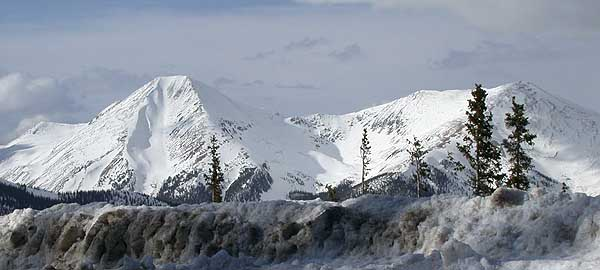
Mt. Aetna (left) and Taylor Mountain (right)

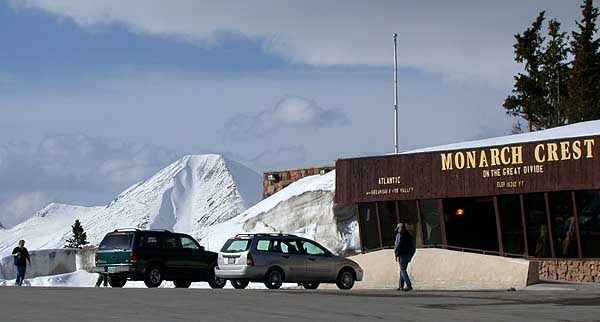
Mt. Aetna seen from Monarch Pass

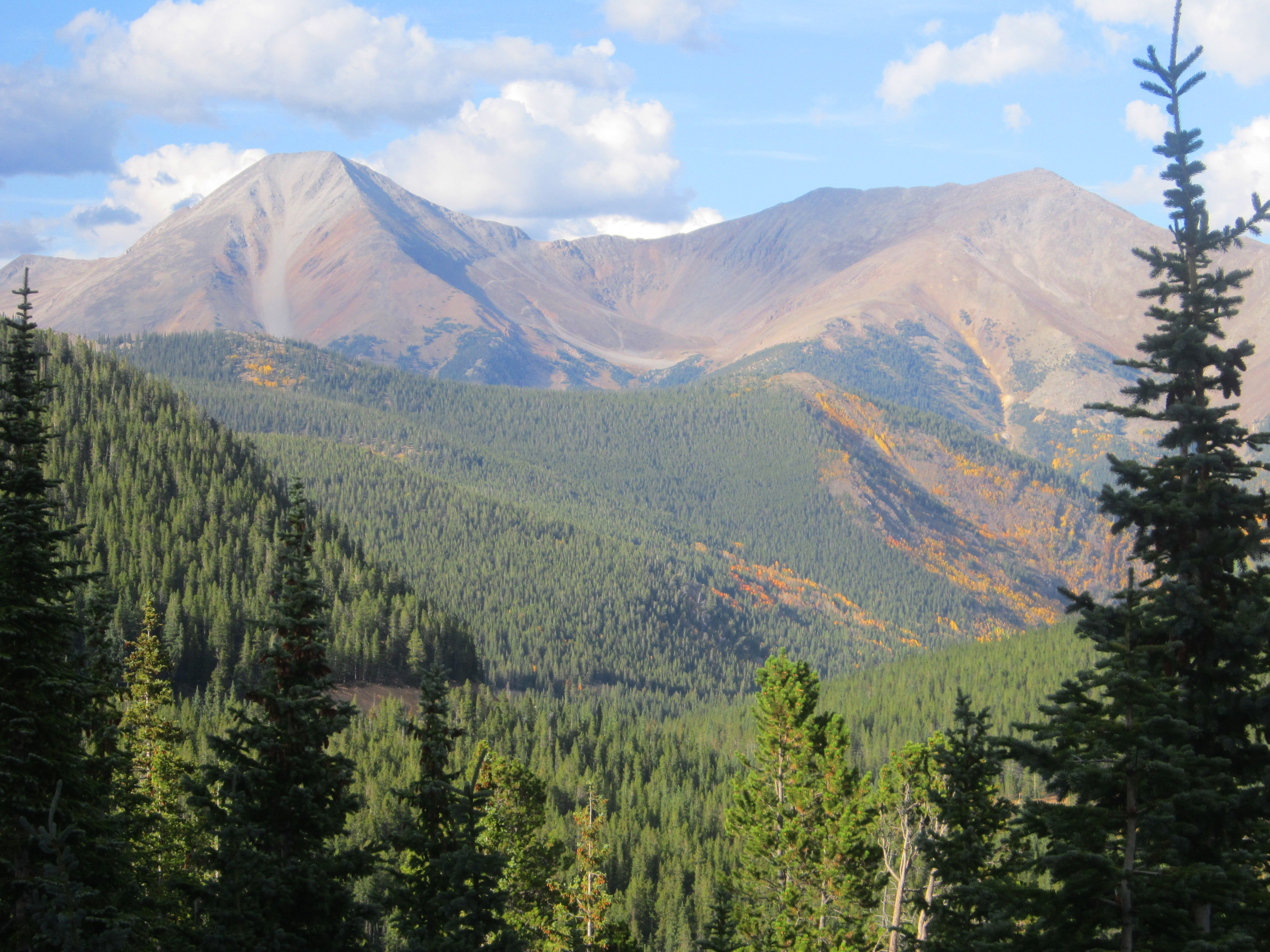
Mt. Aetna (left) from Monarch Pass
