= Mount Yale =

Mountain in Colorado, United States

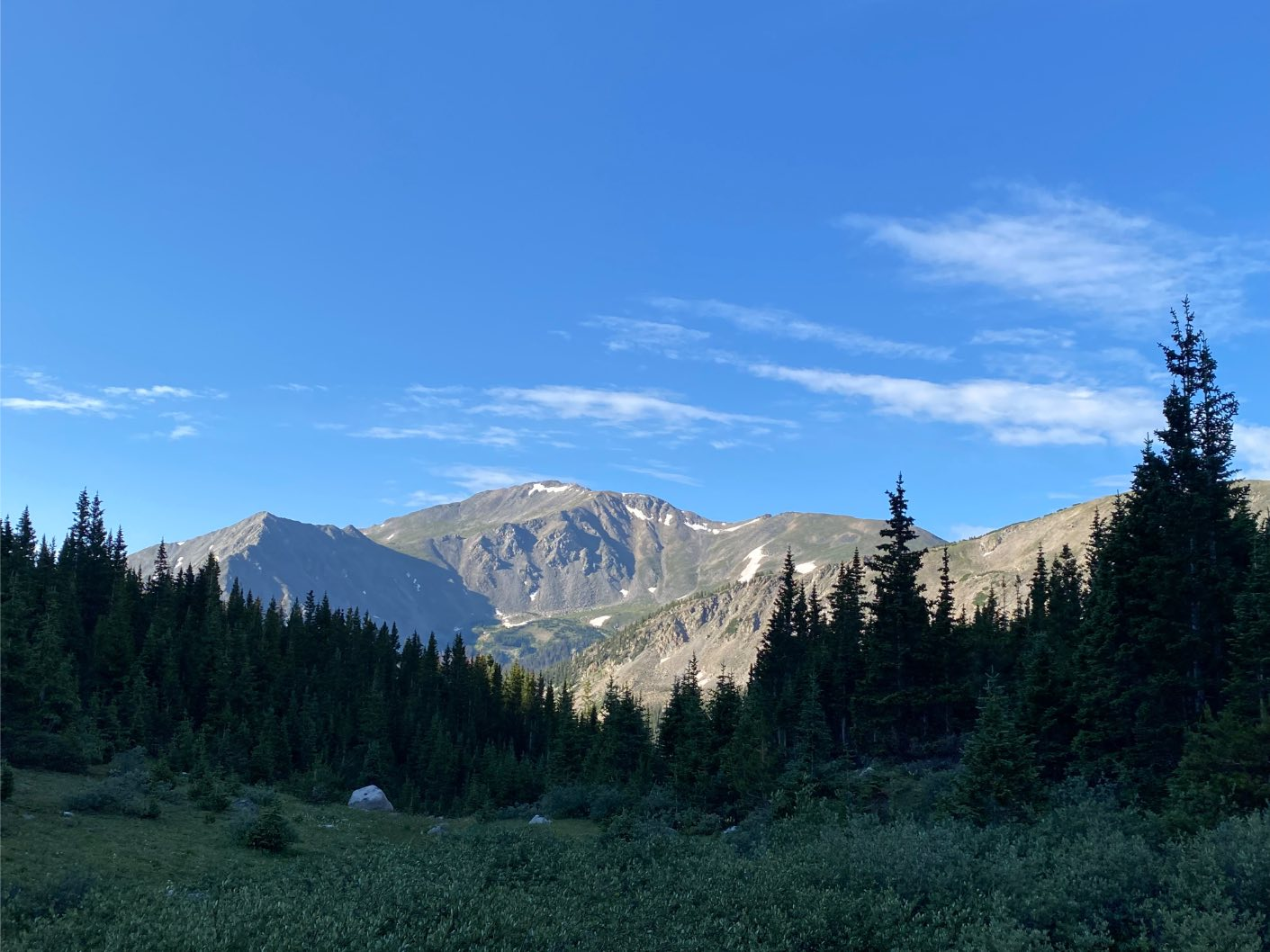
- Yale as seen from the Horn Fork Basin

Highest point
- Elevation: 14,197.0 ft (4,327.2 m); NAPGD2022
- Prominence: 1896 ft (578 m)
- Isolation: 5.55 mi (8.93 km)
- Listing: North America highest peaks 47th; US highest major peaks 33rd; Colorado highest major peaks 16th; Colorado fourteeners 21st
- Coordinates: 38°50′39″N 106°18′50″W

Geography
- Location within Colorado
- Location: Chaffee County, Colorado, U.S.
- Parent range: Sawatch Range, Collegiate Peaks
- Topo map(s): USGS 7.5' topographic map Mount Yale, Colorado

Climbing
- First ascent: August 18, 1869 by William Brewer, William Davis, Robert Moore, S. Sharpless, Josiah Whitney
- Easiest route: Southwest Slopes: Hike, class 2

Mount Yale is a high and prominent mountain summit of the Collegiate Peaks in the Sawatch Range of the Rocky Mountains of North America. The 14,197-foot (4327.24 m) fourteener is located in the Collegiate Peaks Wilderness of San Isabel National Forest, 9.4 miles (15.2 km) west by north (bearing 276°) of Buena Vista, Colorado. The mountain was named in honor of Elihu Yale, the primary benefactor of what is now Yale University.

== Geography ==
The term "Collegiate Peaks" comes from some of its individual peaks, which are named after universities, including Mount Harvard, Mount Princeton, Mount Oxford, Mount Columbia, and Mount Yale itself. Much of the upper part of the mountain is covered in scree and boulder fields. The summit is 14,199 ft (4,328 m) in elevation.

=== Climate ===
Climate data for Mount Yale 38.8437 N, 106.3092 W, Elevation: 13,406 ft (4,086 m) (1991–2020 normals)
Month	Jan	Feb	Mar	Apr	May	Jun	Jul	Aug	Sep	Oct	Nov	Dec	Year
Mean daily maximum °F (°C)	22.7 (−5.2)	22.0 (−5.6)	27.2 (−2.7)	32.3 (0.2)	41.2 (5.1)	53.1 (11.7)	58.3 (14.6)	56.2 (13.4)	50.2 (10.1)	39.9 (4.4)	29.3 (−1.5)	22.9 (−5.1)	37.9 (3.3)
Daily mean °F (°C)	11.1 (−11.6)	10.2 (−12.1)	14.8 (−9.6)	19.7 (−6.8)	28.6 (−1.9)	39.1 (3.9)	44.6 (7.0)	43.1 (6.2)	37.0 (2.8)	27.4 (−2.6)	18.2 (−7.7)	11.7 (−11.3)	25.5 (−3.6)
Mean daily minimum °F (°C)	−0.4 (−18.0)	−1.6 (−18.7)	2.4 (−16.4)	7.0 (−13.9)	15.9 (−8.9)	25.2 (−3.8)	30.8 (−0.7)	29.9 (−1.2)	23.9 (−4.5)	15.0 (−9.4)	7.1 (−13.8)	0.5 (−17.5)	13.0 (−10.6)
Average precipitation inches (mm)	3.62 (92)	3.49 (89)	3.26 (83)	4.11 (104)	2.73 (69)	1.25 (32)	2.58 (66)	3.12 (79)	2.37 (60)	2.45 (62)	2.97 (75)	2.73 (69)	34.68 (880)
Source: PRISM Climate Group

== History ==
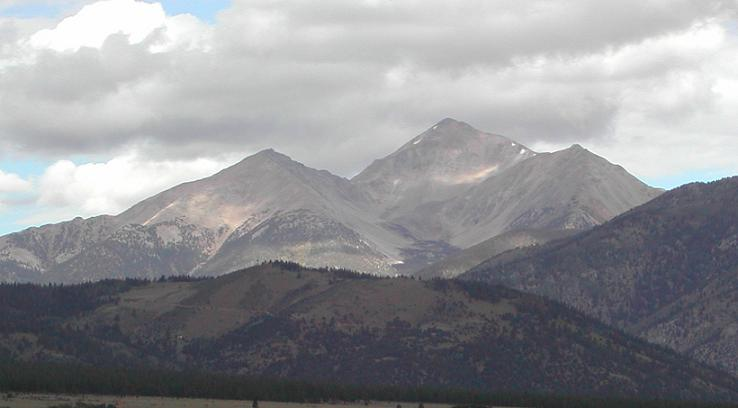
Yale is the highest peak seen in this picture

Mount Yale was first climbed by a research team from Harvard University led by Josiah Whitney. The group named the taller Mount Harvard (14,420 ft) after their own university and the shorter Mount Yale after Whitney's alma mater.

Due to the similarity in heights of Mount Princeton and Mount Yale (Princeton is one foot (0.30 m) higher), it was once a tradition for the alumni of each school to carry rocks to the top of their respective mountain in order to add to the stone pyramid built at the summit. The graduates used these rock towers to ensure their mountain was the tallest.

== Hiking ==
Mount Yale has achieved great popularity as a non-technical fourteener. The mountain offers views of the Sawatch Range and Buena Vista, and is a primary "training" mountain for those wishing to tackle more difficult fourteeners later in the season.

The standard route for climbing Mount Yale was once Denny Gulch, but overuse turned the trail into both a safety and environmental issue. The Denny Gulch trailhead was closed by the Forest Service for restoration, and now most hikers use the nearby Denny Creek Trailhead to begin their hike.

The climb up Mount Yale is 9.5 mile long with 4,300 ft elevation gain. It is rated as class 2.

== See also ==
- List of mountain peaks of North America
  - List of mountain peaks of the United States
    - List of mountain peaks of Colorado
      - List of Colorado fourteeners
