= Red Table Mountain =

Mountain in Colorado, United States

- Location within Colorado

Highest point
- Elevation: 12,043 ft (3,671 m)
- Prominence: 2,017 ft (615 m)
- Isolation: 7.88 mi (12.68 km)
- Listing: Colorado prominent summits
- Coordinates: 39°25′05″N 106°46′16″W

Geography
- Location: Eagle County, Colorado, U.S.
- Parent range: Sawatch Range
- Topo map(s): USGS 7.5' topographic map Red Creek, Colorado

Climbing
- Easiest route: hike

Red Table Mountain, elevation 12,043 ft (3,671 m), is a summit in the Sawatch Range of central Colorado. The peak is south of Eagle in the White River National Forest.

== See also ==
- List of Colorado mountain ranges
- List of Colorado mountain summits
  - List of Colorado fourteeners
  - List of Colorado 4000 meter prominent summits
  - List of the most prominent summits of Colorado
- List of Colorado county high points
