= Monarch, Colorado =

Unincorporated community in Chaffee County, CO, USA

- Unincorporated community
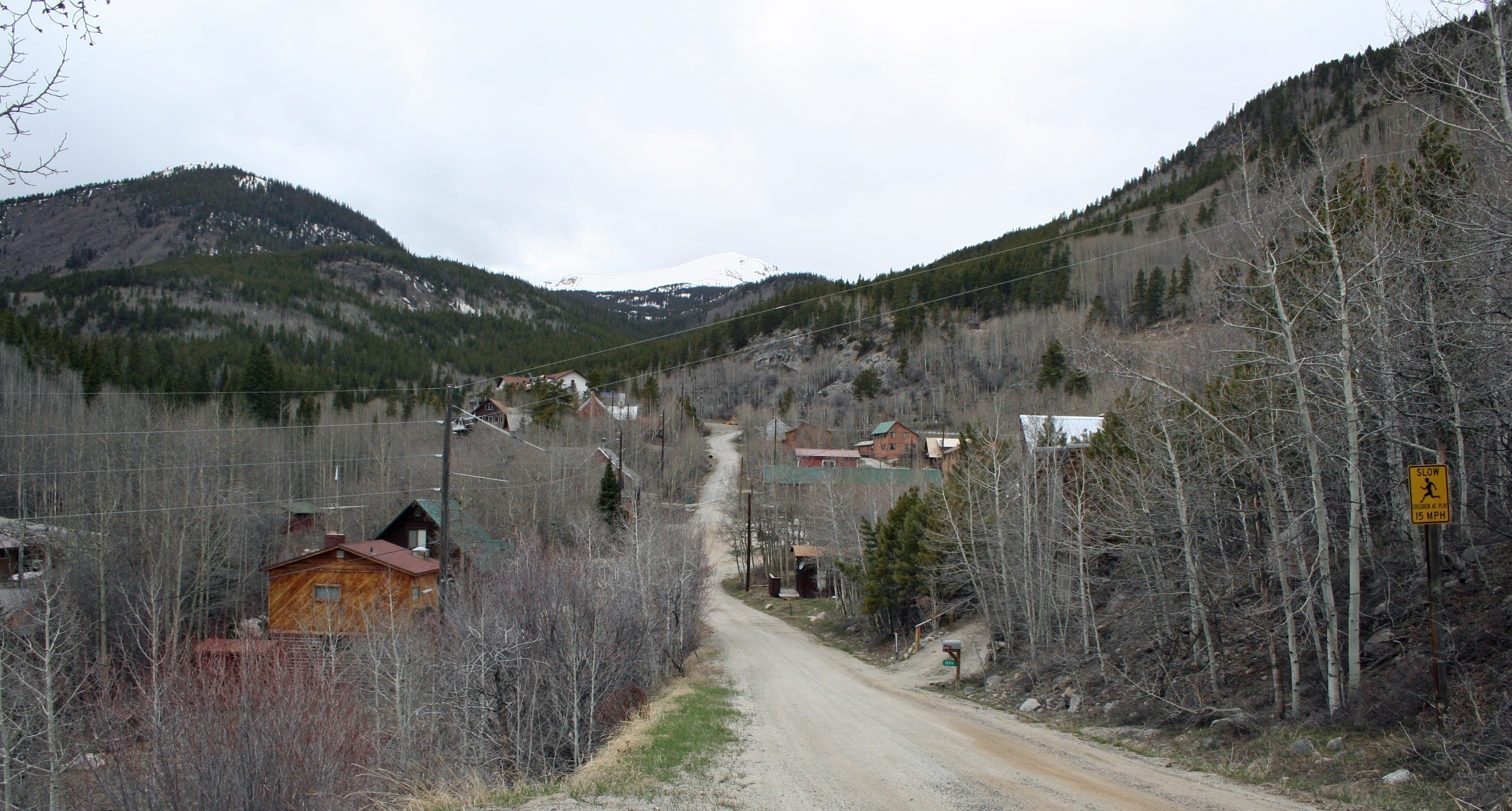
- Monarch's main road.

- Location in the state of Colorado Monarch, Colorado (the United States)
- Coordinates: 38.5526022°N 106.2939187°W
- Country: United States
- State: Colorado
- County: Chaffee
- Time zone: UTC-7 (MST)
  - Summer (DST): UTC-6 (MDT)
- ZIP code: 81227 (PO Box)

Monarch is an unincorporated community and a U.S. Post Office located near Monarch Pass in Chaffee County, Colorado, United States. The Monarch U.S. Post Office has the ZIP Code 81227.

== Geography ==
Monarch is located in the valley of the South Arkansas River, 12 miles (19 km) west-northwest of Poncha Springs.
