= Snogo Snow Plow =

- SnoGo Snow Blower
- U.S. National Register of Historic Places
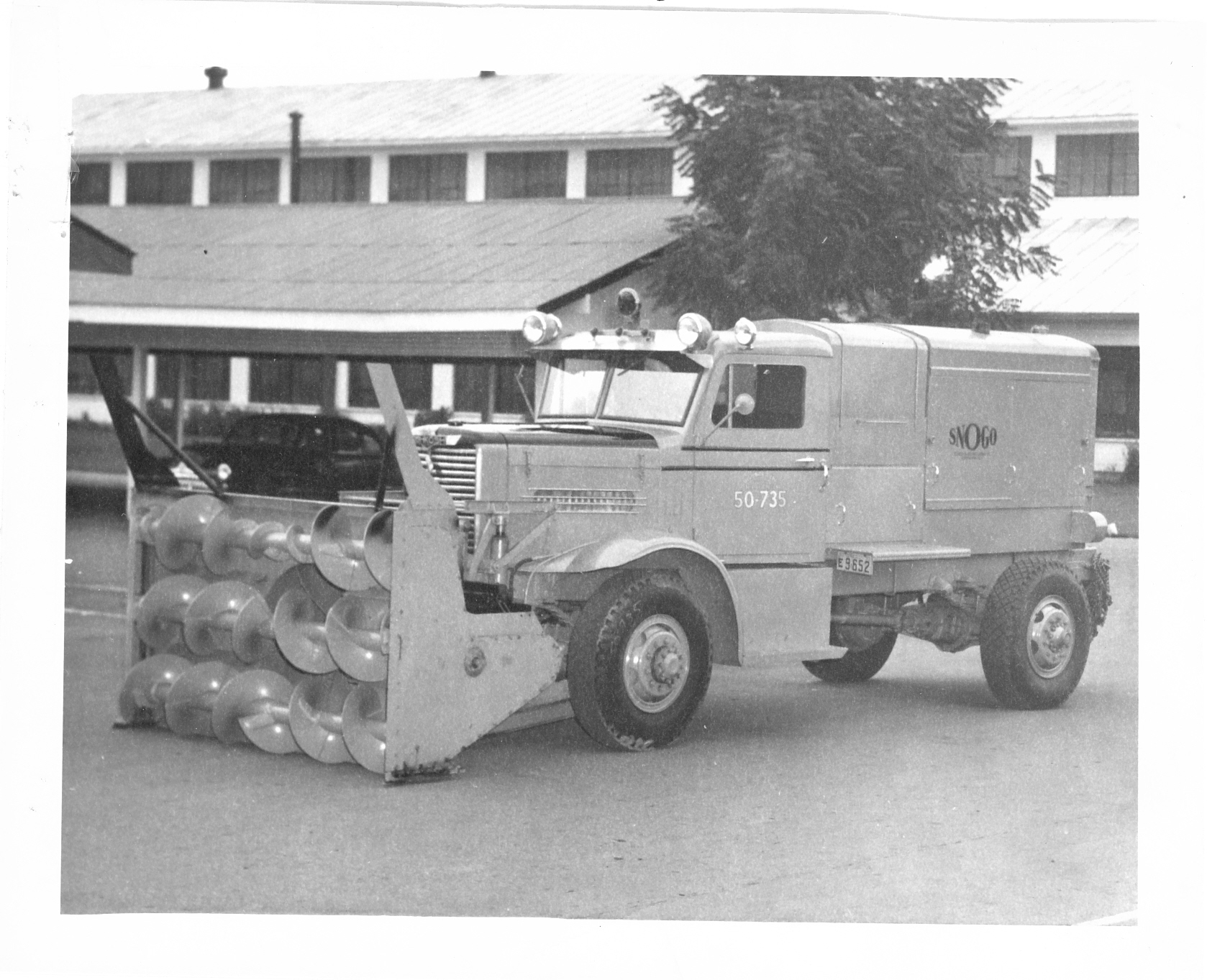
- SNOGO Snow Plow (1950)

- Location within Colorado Location within the United States
- Nearest city: Estes Park, Colorado
- Coordinates: 40°21′51″N 105°33′34″W
- Built: 1932
- Architect: Klauer Mfg. Co.
- NRHP reference No.: 06000934
- Added to NRHP: October 04, 2006

SnoGo Snow Blower is a brand of truck-mounted rotary snow blower originally produced by the Klauer Engineering Company of Dubuque, Iowa, in 1928 and initially styled as SNOGO. Wausau Equipment Company, Inc., purchased the line from Klauer, styled by then as SnoGo, in 2000; as of 2025 it continues to produce SnoGo brand snow removal equipment for both municipal and airport use.

A "revolution in snow removal", the original SNOGO's used motors as large as 400 hp to move up to 4,200 tons of snow per hour, and offered such advanced features as an enclosed cab, four wheel drive, and roll-up windows.

A 1932 SNOGO owned by the United States National Park Service, one of 39 made by Klauer during 1928-1934, is believed to be the oldest in existence. It was used on Trail Ridge Road in Rocky Mountain National Park, Colorado, until 1952.

The Park Service blower used a six-cylinder 1,188 cu in (19,470 cm^{3}) Climax Blue Streak gasoline engine, which developed 175 horsepower (130 kW) at 1,200 RPM. It had an eight-speed transmission allowing vehicle speed to be regulated between 1/4 to 25 miles per hour (0.40 to 40.23 km/h) when not moving snow. It was claimed to be capable of throwing snow 100 feet (30 m) to the side.

Similar blowers, used at Crater Lake and Yosemite National Parks, no longer exist. In 1943 the blower was loaned to Rapid City Air Base for use in keeping the airfield's runways clear, then returned in the spring. The National Park Service gave it to the city of Estes Park, Colorado in 1952, which used it until 1979, when it was damaged by water entering through the exhaust. The plow was returned to the park and put on display at the Beaver Meadows Visitor Center. As of 2009 the park planned to restore the plow to operating condition.

== Gallery ==
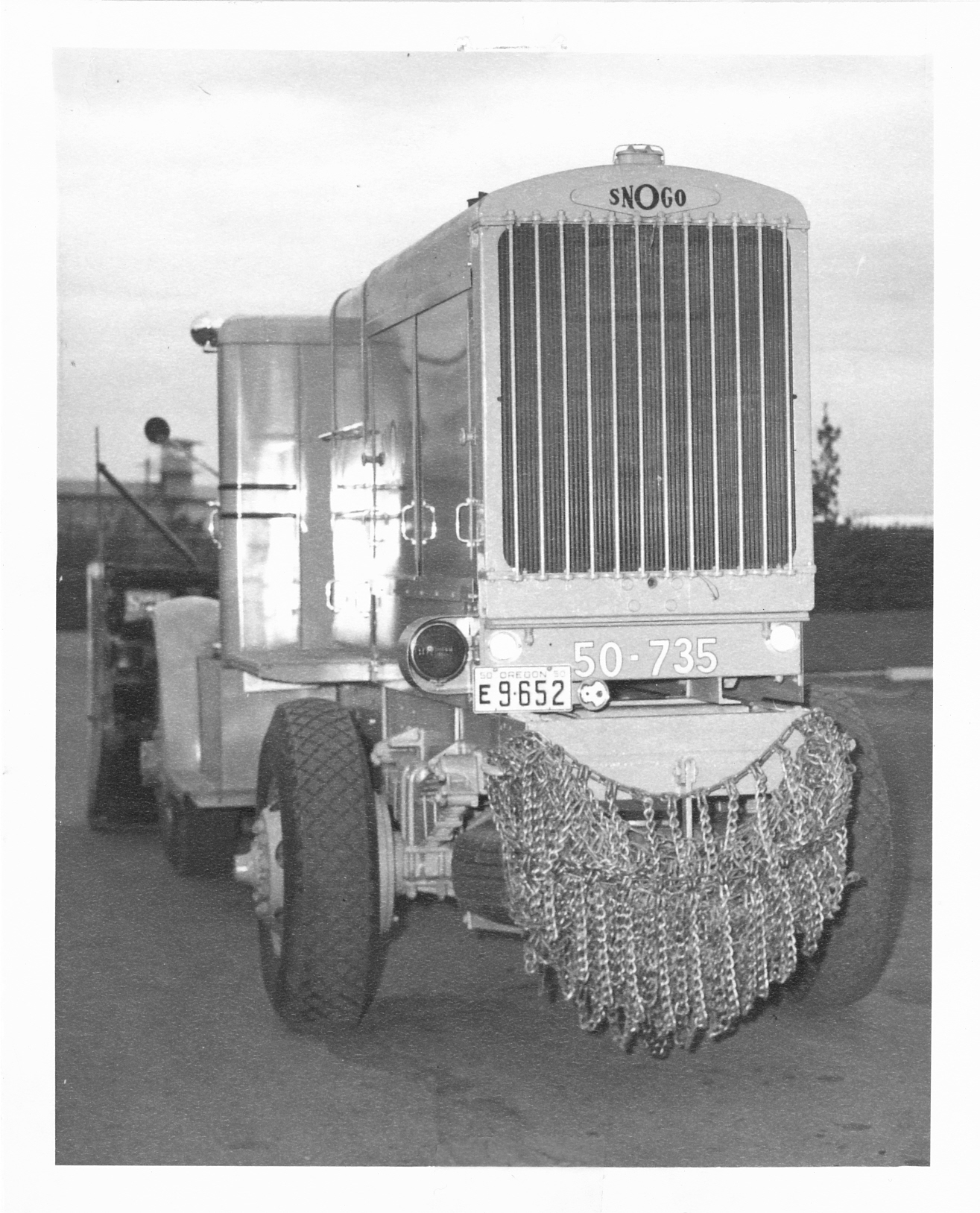
Oregon Highway Department SNOGO in 1950 (rear view)

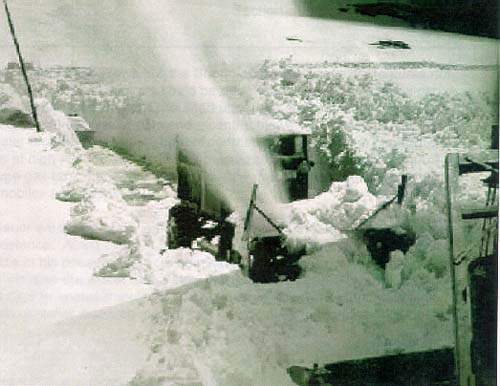
SNOGO snow blower in action

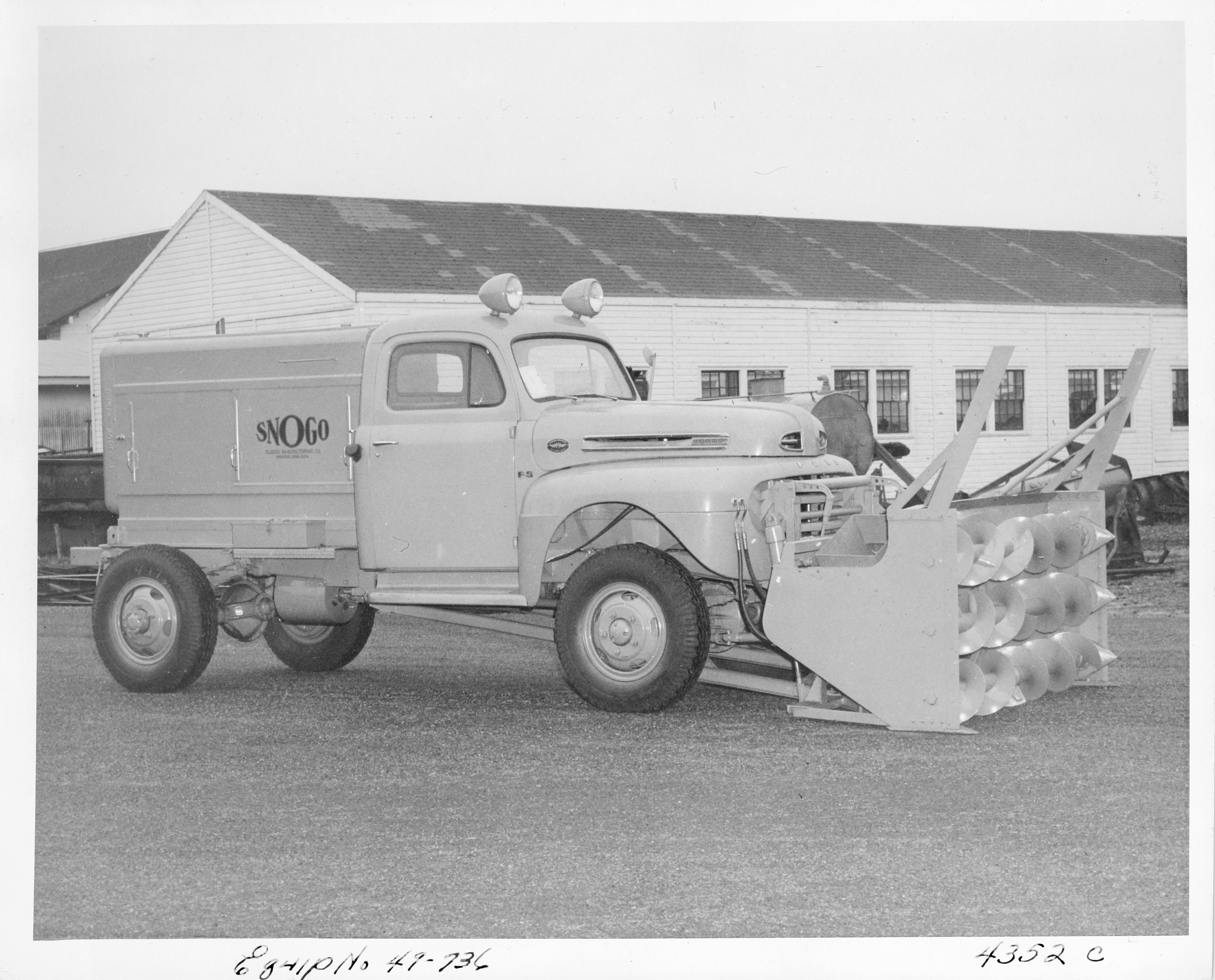
Oregon Highway Department SNOGO in 1949

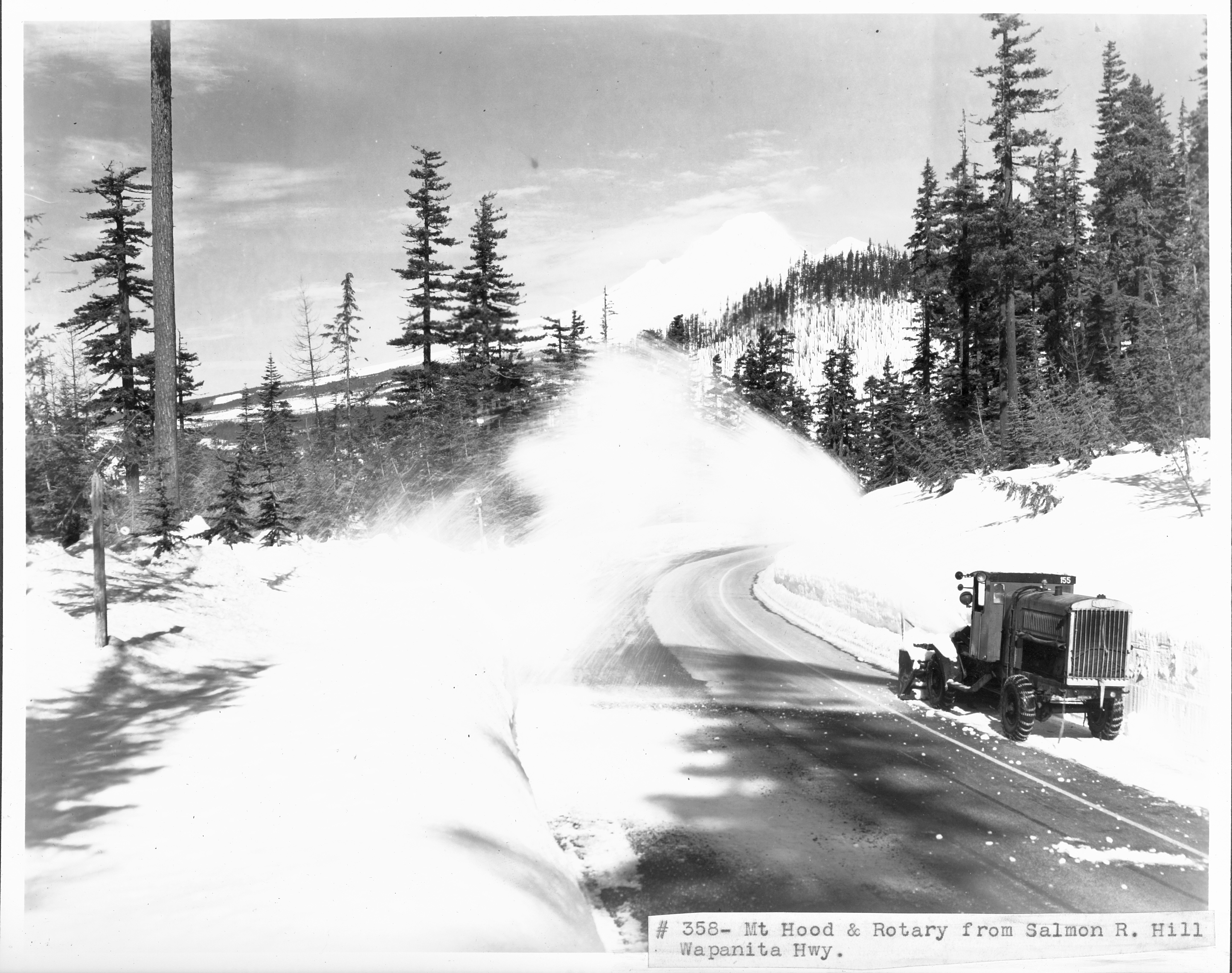
SNOGO clearing on Mount Hood in Oregon

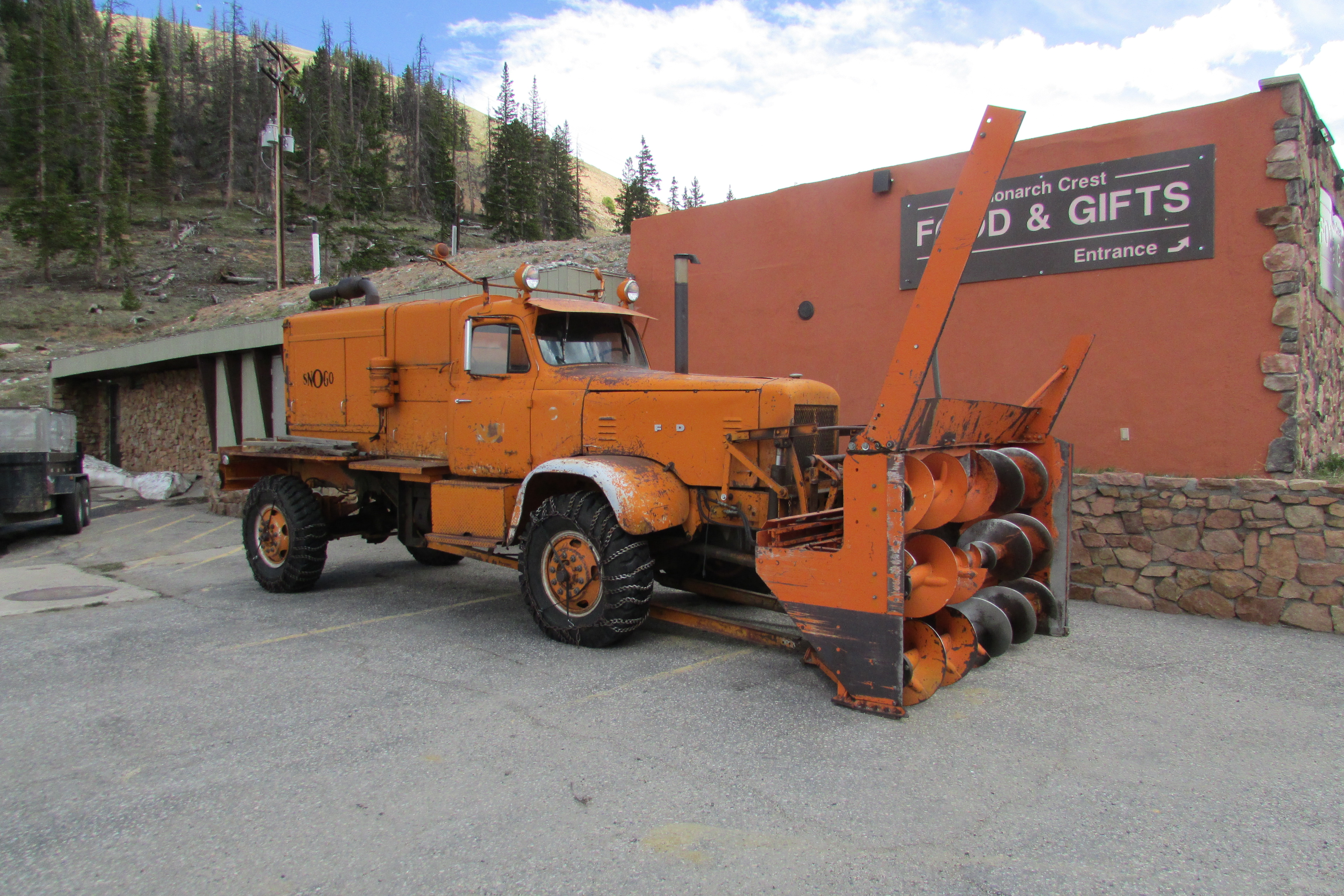
SNOGO ready with chains on at Monarch Crest on US Highway 50 in Colorado

== See also ==
- National Register of Historic Places listings in Larimer County, Colorado
