= Mount Harvard =

Mountain in Colorado, United States

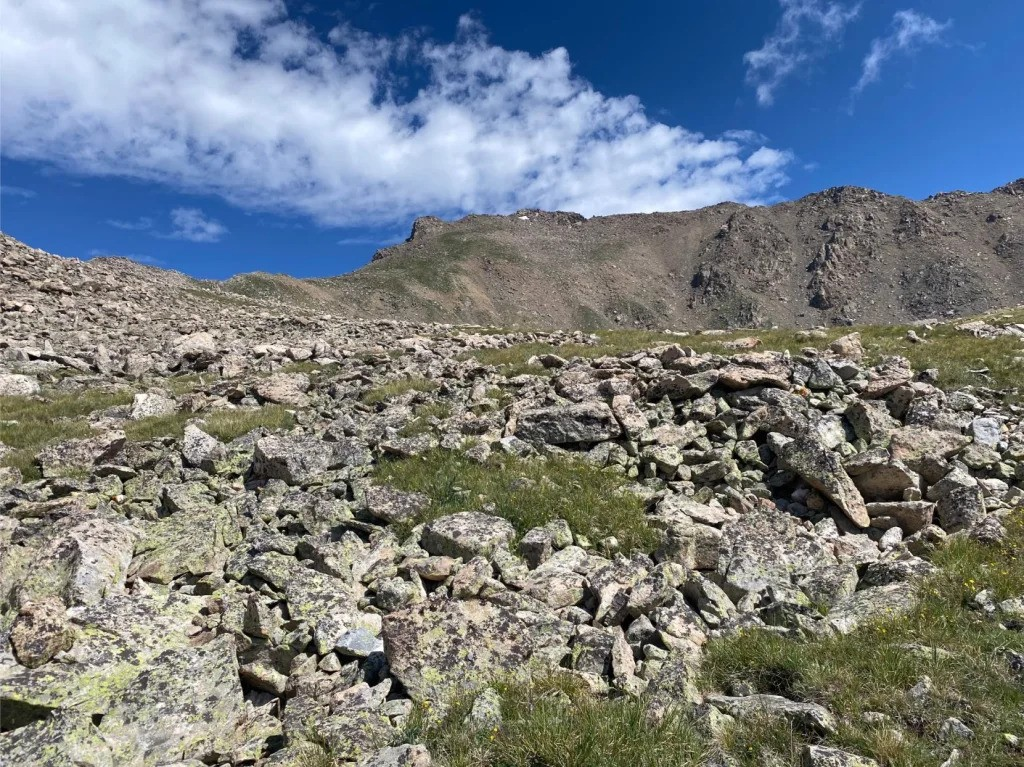
- Harvard as viewed from a boulder field in the Horn Fork Basin. The true summit is right above the snowfield seen roughly in the middle of the photo.

Highest point
- Elevation: 14,421 ft (4,396 m); NAVD88
- Prominence: 2360 ft (719 m)
- Isolation: 14.92 mi (24.0 km)
- Listing: North America highest peaks 29th; US highest major peaks 16th; Colorado fourteeners 3rd; Colorado county high points 2nd
- Coordinates: 38°55′28″N 106°19′15″W

Geography
- Location within Colorado
- Location: High point of Chaffee County, Colorado, United States
- Parent range: Sawatch Range, Highest summit of the Collegiate Peaks
- Topo map(s): USGS 7.5' topographic map Mount Harvard, Colorado

Climbing
- First ascent: August 19, 1869 (first recorded)
- Easiest route: South Slopes: Hike, class 2

Mount Harvard is the third highest summit of the Rocky Mountains of North America and the U.S. state of Colorado. The prominent 14,421-foot (4395.6 m) fourteener is the highest summit of the Collegiate Peaks and the fourth highest summit in the contiguous United States. Mount Harvard is located in the Collegiate Peaks Wilderness of San Isabel National Forest, 11.7 miles (18.9 km) northwest by west (bearing 304°) of the Town of Buena Vista in Chaffee County, Colorado, United States. The summit of Mount Harvard is the highest point in Chaffee County and is higher than any point in the United States east of its longitude. The mountain was named in honor of Harvard University. (Note: The elevation of Mount Harvard includes an adjustment of +2.084 m (+6.84 ft) from NGVD 29 to NAVD 88.)

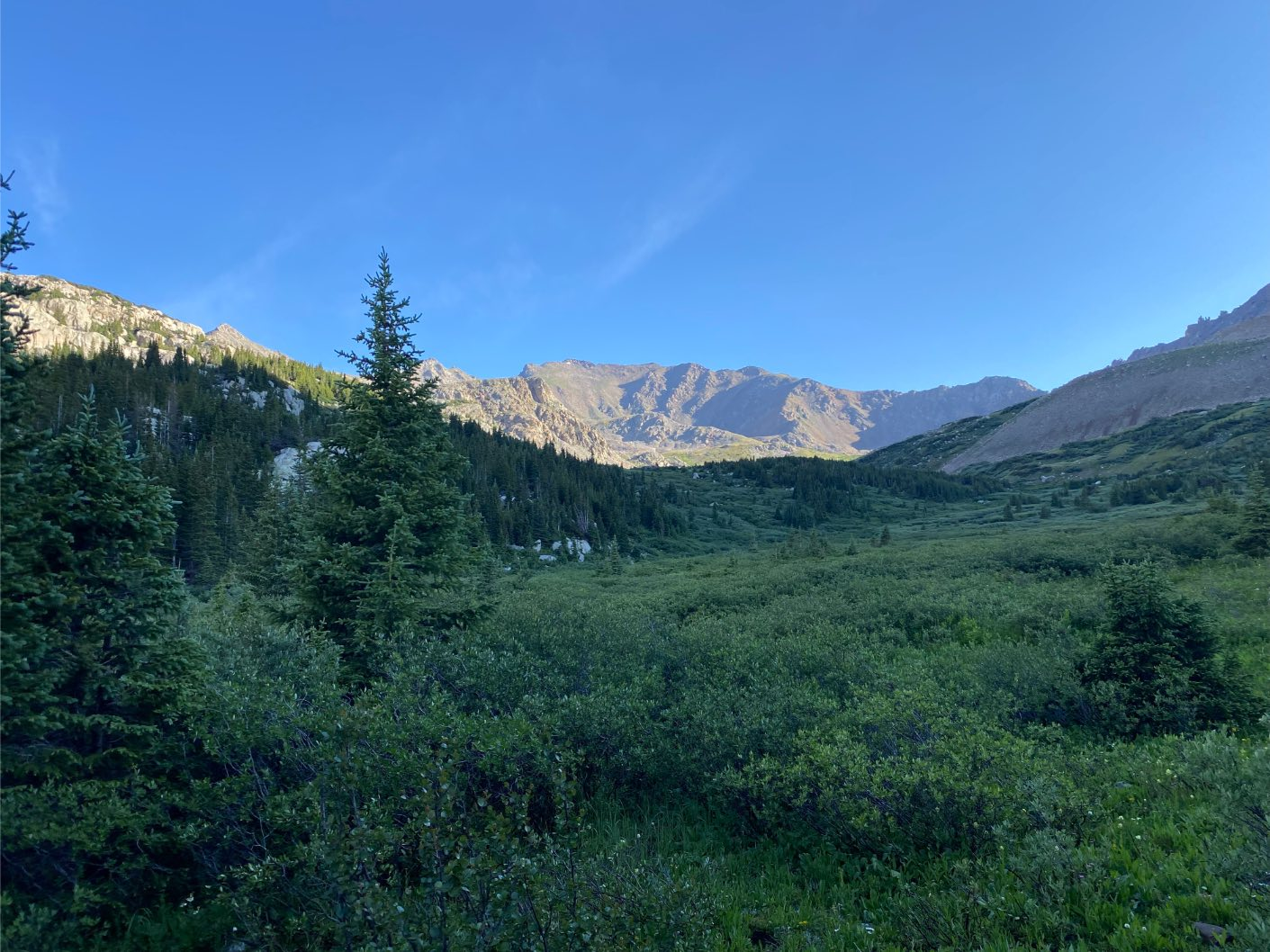
Harvard viewed from lower in the Horn Fork Basin

== History ==
Mount Harvard was named in 1869 by members of the first Harvard Mining School class, while on expedition with professor Josiah Dwight Whitney, the namesake of Mount Whitney. The same group named the peak next to Harvard Mount Yale, after Whitney's alma mater. The group climbed Yale first, and estimated that it was over 14,000 feet in height. On August 19, 1869, the first recorded ascent of Harvard was made by expedition members S. F. Sharpless and William M. Davis. Harvard and Yale were the first 14,000 foot mountains in the Sawatch range to be named after universities. Later, nearby mountains were named for Princeton, Columbia, and Oxford, leading to the name "Collegiate Peaks" for this part of the Sawatch Range.

=== The pole ===
In 1962, three Harvard men attempted to erect a fourteen-foot metal pole on the top of Harvard, with a sign that read "Mt. Harvard, 14,434. This sign erected at an altitude of 14,434 making it the second highest point in the contiguous United States." Before they could reach the top of the mountain darkness set in, and the group was forced to abandon the pole a few hundred yards short of the summit. The next year, two Harvard men (Tim Wirth, who later represented Colorado's Second Congressional District and then served a term in the U.S. Senate, and his brother John), along with a Cornell graduate carried the pole the extra distance, and completed the task. The pole sat on the mountain for roughly twenty years, until it disappeared at some time in the 1980s, most likely as part of an effort to clean up Colorado's fourteeners.

== Climbing ==
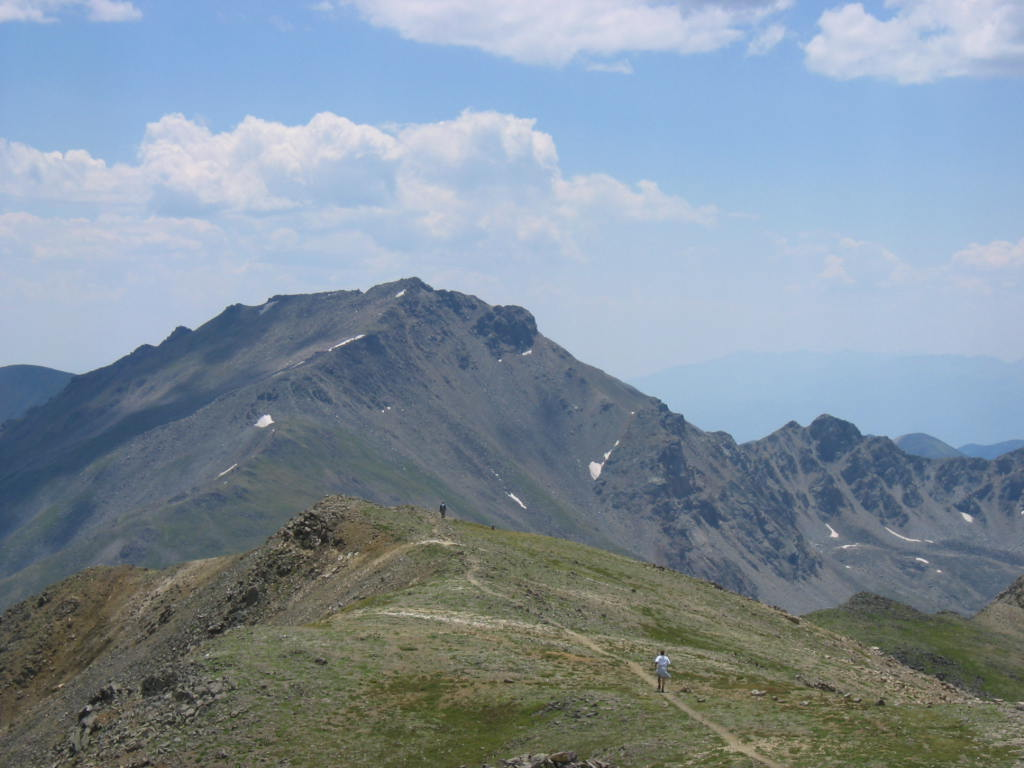
Mt. Harvard in 2006

The standard route on Mount Harvard is the South Slopes, which is a mostly class 1 hike, with class 2 scrambling sections near the summit. The hike is approximately 14 miles (22.5 km) round trip and 4,600 feet (1,402 m) of elevation gain. The trail begins at the North Cottonwood Creek Trailhead, at the end of Road 365. The route is often completed in one day, but primitive backcountry campsites are available as well. The hike is noted for sweeping views of the surrounding region. Also near the route is Bear Lake, an alpine lake noted for ample fishing opportunities.

Some hikers choose to do a "traverse" from the summit of Mount Harvard to nearby Mount Columbia as well, which follows a Ridgeline. Once on Mount Columbia, the West Slopes Route would be descended back down into the basin. This traverse is noted to be a long, strenuous, tedious undertaking and there is no trail along the ridge.

== Climate ==
Climate data for Mount Harvard (CO) 38.9270 N, 106.3170 W, Elevation: 13,970 ft (4,260 m) (1991–2020 normals)
Month	Jan	Feb	Mar	Apr	May	Jun	Jul	Aug	Sep	Oct	Nov	Dec	Year
Mean daily maximum °F (°C)	21.2 (−6.0)	20.5 (−6.4)	25.3 (−3.7)	30.4 (−0.9)	39.2 (4.0)	50.9 (10.5)	56.2 (13.4)	54.2 (12.3)	48.2 (9.0)	38.2 (3.4)	27.7 (−2.4)	21.5 (−5.8)	36.1 (2.3)
Daily mean °F (°C)	9.4 (−12.6)	8.4 (−13.1)	13.1 (−10.5)	17.4 (−8.1)	26.1 (−3.3)	36.6 (2.6)	42.0 (5.6)	40.6 (4.8)	34.8 (1.6)	25.4 (−3.7)	16.4 (−8.7)	10.0 (−12.2)	23.3 (−4.8)
Mean daily minimum °F (°C)	−2.4 (−19.1)	−3.7 (−19.8)	0.1 (−17.7)	4.4 (−15.3)	13.0 (−10.6)	22.2 (−5.4)	27.9 (−2.3)	27.1 (−2.7)	21.3 (−5.9)	12.7 (−10.7)	5.0 (−15.0)	−1.4 (−18.6)	10.5 (−11.9)
Average precipitation inches (mm)	3.17 (81)	3.32 (84)	3.81 (97)	4.36 (111)	3.07 (78)	1.40 (36)	2.78 (71)	3.02 (77)	2.35 (60)	2.69 (68)	3.12 (79)	3.16 (80)	36.25 (922)
Source: PRISM Climate Group

== See also ==
- List of mountain peaks of North America
  - List of mountain peaks of the United States
    - List of mountain peaks of Colorado
      - List of Colorado county high points
      - List of Colorado fourteeners
