= Mount Columbia (Colorado) =

Mountain in Colorado, United States

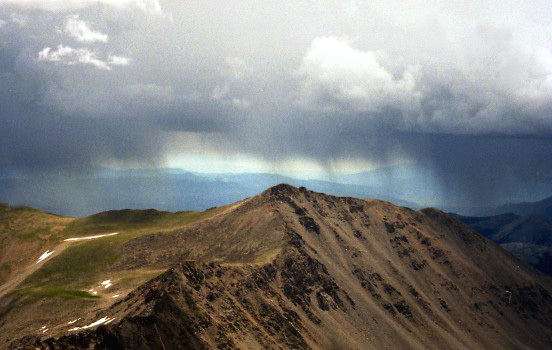
- Mount Columbia as seen from Mount Harvard

Highest point
- Elevation: 14,072.6 ft (4,289.3 m); NAPGD2022
- Prominence: 893 ft (272 m)
- Parent peak: Mount Harvard
- Isolation: 1.90 mi (3.06 km)
- Listing: Colorado Fourteener 35th
- Coordinates: 38°54′14″N 106°17′51″W

Geography
- Location within Colorado
- Location: Chaffee County, Colorado, U.S.
- Parent range: Sawatch Range, Collegiate Peaks
- Topo map(s): USGS 7.5' topographic map Mount Columbia, Colorado

Climbing
- First ascent: 1916 by Roger Toll
- Easiest route: West Slopes: Hike, class 2

Mount Columbia is a high mountain summit of the Collegiate Peaks in the Sawatch Range of the Rocky Mountains of North America. The 14,072.6-foot (4,289 m) fourteener is located in the Collegiate Peaks Wilderness of San Isabel National Forest, 9.9 miles (16.0 km) northwest by west (bearing 301°) of the Town of Buena Vista in Chaffee County, Colorado, United States. The mountain was named by Roger W. Toll in honor of his alma mater, Columbia University, and in commemoration of its rowing victory at the renowned Henley Royal Regatta in 1878.

== Mountain ==
Along with nearby Mount Harvard, Mount Yale, Mount Princeton, and Mount Oxford, Mount Columbia is one of five Collegiate Peaks named for prominent universities. The forest service recommends that hikers take the Horn Fork Basin Route, a 12-mile roundtrip that gains 4,200 feet in elevation. In 2021, the Colorado Fourteeners Initiative completed a new trail on Mount Columbia's west slopes, bypassing the old user-created trail through a notoriously eroded scree field.

== See also ==
- List of mountain peaks of Colorado
  - List of Colorado fourteeners
