= Monarch Mountain (ski area) =

Ski area in Colorado, United States

- Location in Colorado Monarch Mountain (the United States)
- Location: Chaffee County, Colorado, United States
- Nearest city: Salida, Colorado
- Coordinates: 38°30′45″N 106°19′57″W
- Top elevation: 11,960 feet (3,650 m)
- Base elevation: 10,790 feet (3,290 m)
- Skiable area: 800 acres (3.2 km^{2})
- Trails: 63 total 14% beginner 28% Intermediate; 27% Advanced; 31% Expert
- Longest run: 1 mile (1.6 km)
- Lift system: 7 total (1 quad chair, 1 triple chair, 4 double chairs, 1 surface lift)
- Terrain parks: 2
- Snowfall: 400 in/year (1016 cm/year)
- Snowmaking: no
- Night skiing: no
- Website: skimonarch.com

Monarch Mountain is a ski resort located in the state of Colorado. It is twenty miles (32 km) west of Salida, Colorado, on U.S. Highway 50.

The resort is situated on Monarch Pass at the continental divide. It has 54 trails, two terrain parks, and an extreme terrain area called Mirkwood. The Monarch Mountain Lodge is located three miles (4.8 km) east of the ski area in the town of Garfield, Colorado.

The resort is named after Monarch Pass and the associated Monarch Mountain. Monarch Pass and Monarch Mountain themselves are named after the 19th-century town of Monarch, which was razed by the CDOT to make way for US Route 50.

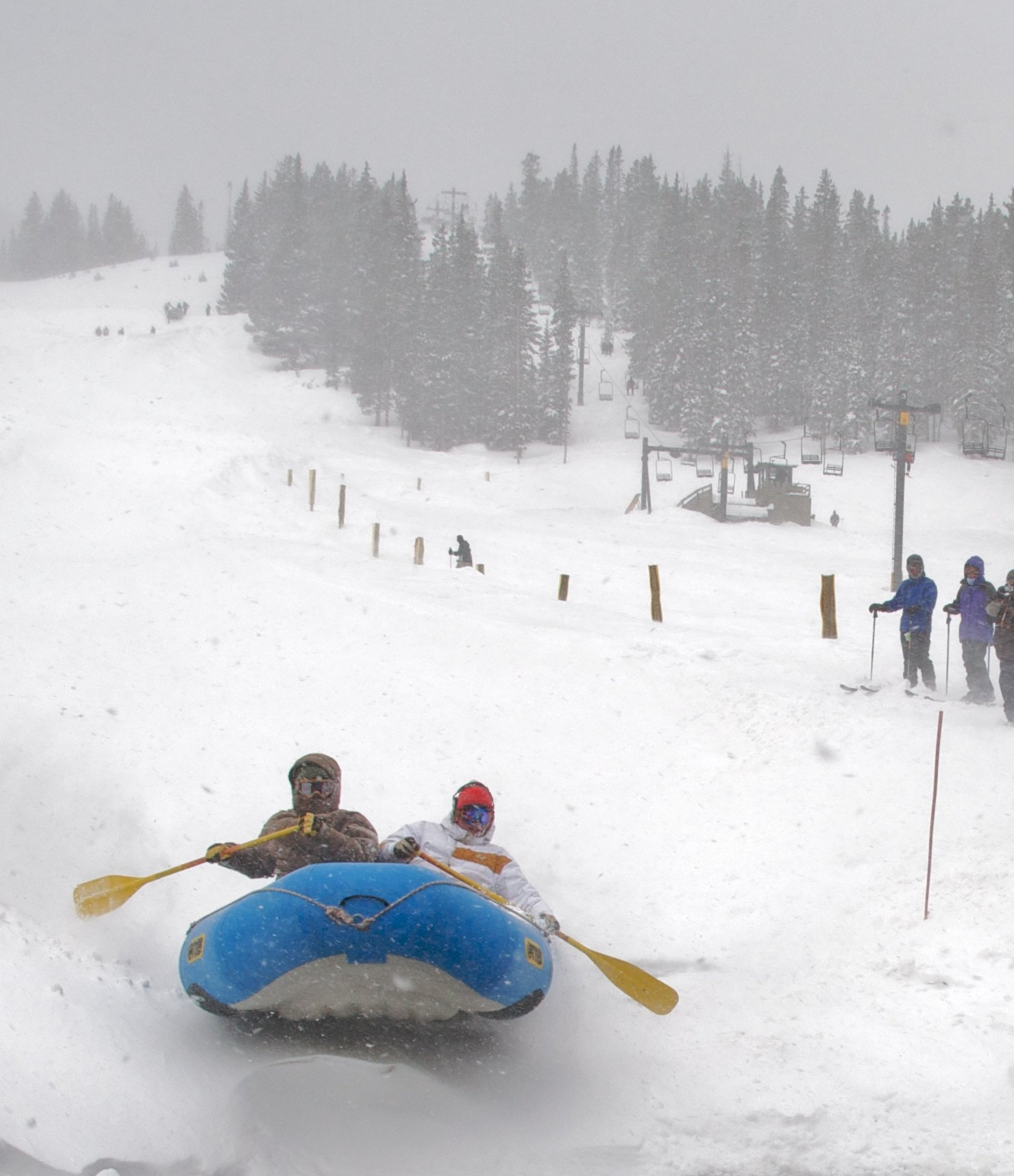
Snow rafting on Monarch Mountain

== History ==
In 1936, a gearbox from an old oil derrick and a Chevy truck engine were brought up Monarch Pass. With this machinery, James Kane along with the Salida Winter Sports Club powered a 500-foot rope-tow up what is now the Gunbarrel ski trail at Monarch Mountain. The cabin that first housed the lift machinery still stands at the base of the run today and the original pulley which the rope ran through still marks the top of the tow. Monarch first opened in 1939, with one rope tow running up the Gunbarrel trail: a steep narrow run with a northern aspect on the south side of the ski area.

The Gunbarrel trail was originally cut only halfway up the current trail. Skiing pioneers described the challenges of the early days: “We skied Gunbarrel for two years before we ever saw anyone who could turn on skis. The challenge was to make it to the bottom of the hill without falling, or falling into a creek during the early part of the season.” -(Gerald Berry, Salida resident and son of Ray Berry, former owner of Monarch Ski Resort). The run was (and is) an expert trail and because of its steepness, which at the time was skied with very long wooden skis most likely without metal edges and leather boots, was known as “Bloody Ridge” and became one of the most legendary runs in Colorado.

During the first inaugural ski season at Monarch during the winter of 1939–40, the Salida Winter Sports Club (SWSC) applied to the U.S. Forest Service for a permit to cut trails, construct a lodge, and build another rope tow called “Snowflake”. The Works Progress Administration (WPA) issued the initial construction grant during the Great Depression for $26,000. The town of Salida officially owned Monarch during the early days, and it was leased to the SWSC for a 10% cut of the profits. Season passes cost just $1, and 64 of them were sold. Additional lift revenue was brought in through the sale of 25-cent day tickets. Total day ticket sales for the 1939-40 ski season netted only $50.00

Monarch has been owned and sold many times and is currently owned by many separate parties, none owning more than 25%.

=== Expansion Into No Name Basin ===
As of July 8, 2024, Monarch Mountain has received approval by the US Forest Service to expand into No Name Basin. Previously accessed by Monarch's cat-skiing operation, it will feature 10 cut trails and an additional 75 acres of gladed terrain for skiers and snowboarders to explore. A fixed-grip triple chairlift, rising nearly 1,000 vertical feet, will serve the mostly intermediate and advanced terrain.

== Terrain parks ==
The run formerly known as Slo-Motion was developed into the K2 terrain park in 2008. It is composed of all-natural features, including logs, stumps, and jumps. The run can be used by anyone, even if they have no intent of using any of the features. It is next known as the Never Summer terrain park. As of 2021, it is now known as Steel City.

There is a small park at the base of the panorama double chairlift called Tilt.

== Snow Cat ==
Monarch Cat Skiing offers 1,635 acres of terrain, featuring wide-open bowls, steep chutes, glades, and tree skiing.
