= Monarch Pass =

Mountain pass in Colorado, USA

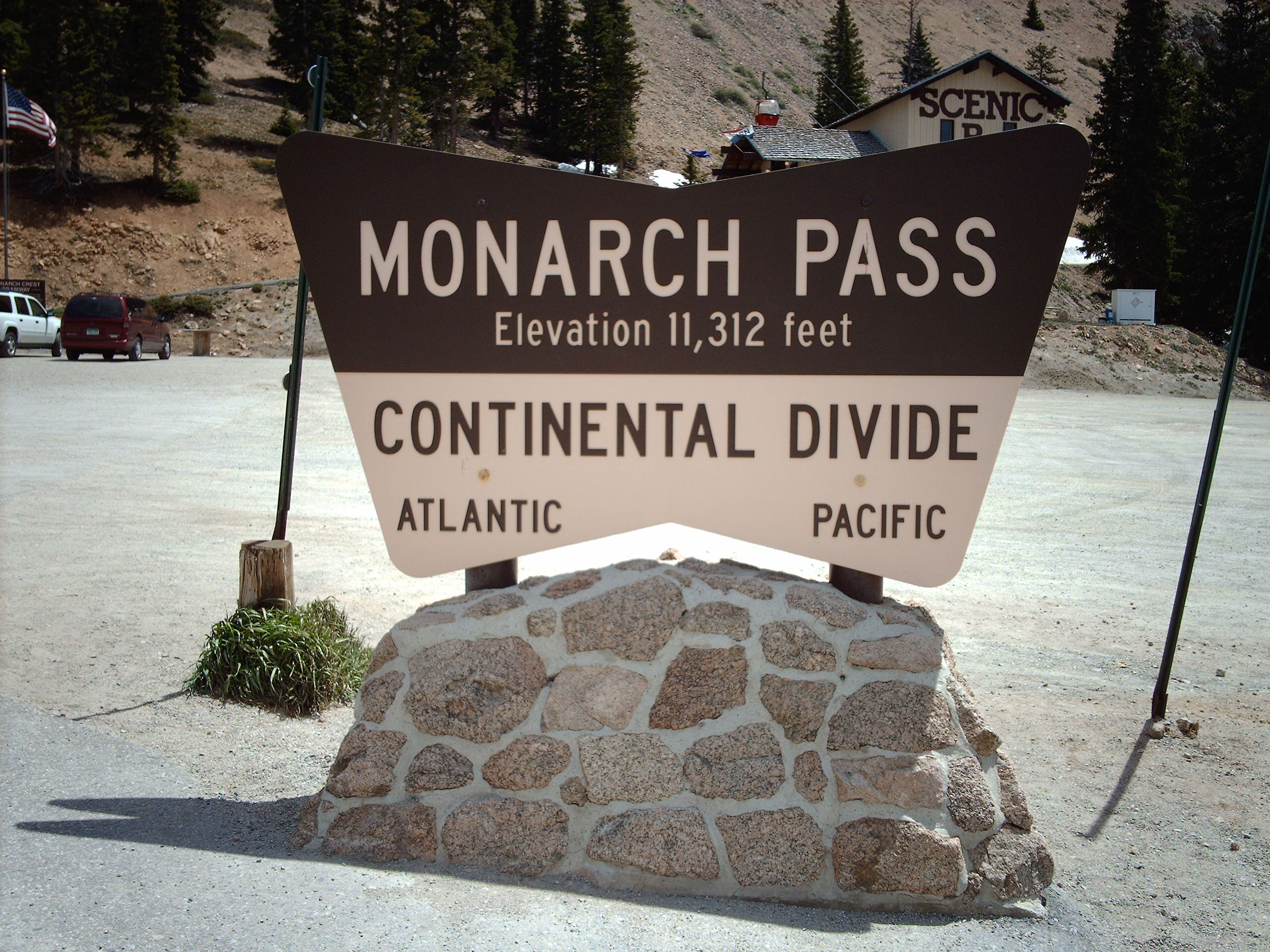
- Sign at the summit

- Location within Colorado
- Elevation: 11,312 feet (3,448 m)
- Traversed by: US 50

Third Approach
- Location: Chaffee / Gunnison counties, Colorado, U.S.
- Range: Sawatch Range
- Coordinates: 38°29′48″N 106°19′32″W
- Topo map: USGS Pahlone Peak

Monarch Pass (elevation 11,312 feet (3,448 m)) is a high mountain pass in the Rocky Mountains of central Colorado, United States.

== Description ==
The pass is located on the Continental Divide of the Americas of the western United States at the southern end of the Sawatch Range along the border between Gunnison and Chaffee counties, approximately 25 miles (40 km) west of the town of Salida. The pass carries U.S. Highway 50 over the Sawatch Range, providing a route between Tomichi Creek in the upper basin of the Gunnison River on the west and the South Arkansas River, a tributary of the Arkansas River, on the east. The pass can be traversed by all vehicles under most conditions and is generally open year-round; however, 7% grades exist, and the area is prone to heavy winter snowfall, often resulting in temporary closures during severe winter storms. Ramps for runaway trucks are located about halfway down both the eastern and western sides of the pass. Much of the highway over the pass is three-lane.

=== Speed advisories and grades ===
Ten curves have a 35 MPH advisory speed and one 30 MPH. The East Descent has a 6% grade for 10 miles. The West Descent has a 6% grade for 9 miles.

Downhill from the summit the maximum safe speed for trucks of a maximum of 50,000 pounds is 45 MPH; for trucks with a maximum weight of 80,000 pounds it is reduced to 15 MPH.

== Scenery ==
The pass is widely considered one of the most scenic in Colorado, offering a panoramic view of the southern end of the Sawatch Range from the summit. During the summer, an aerial tram from the parking lot at the summit carries visitors to the top of Monarch Ridge above the pass (at approximately 12,000 feet (3,700 m) above sea level), allowing a wider view of the surrounding peaks. During the winter, visitors enjoy skiing at Monarch ski area. Monarch Mountain Lodge is located about 5 miles from the summit of the pass.

== History ==
The current Monarch Pass is the third location on the Continental Divide to carry that name. The Original Monarch Pass is just 1.6 miles (2.6 km) northwest of the present pass. A road traversing this first Monarch Pass was constructed in 1880 and served as an important wagon and stage road connecting the town of South Arkansas City (later Salida) on the east side with booming mining camps and the city of Gunnison on the west side. In 1922, the road was improved and rerouted to better accommodate motor vehicles. The new road, today known as Old Monarch Pass, crossed the divide 0.6 miles (0.97 km) northwest of the present pass. It remained an important unpaved crossing of the divide until 1939, when yet another highway realignment was made to accommodate increased traffic.

During the 1930s, efforts were underway to complete the newly designated U.S. Route 50 across America. In Colorado, one of the more difficult challenges was the routing of the new highway over the Continental Divide. It was clear new road would need to be constructed, but there were three competing options for where to cross the divide. Marshall Pass and Cochetopa Pass, both to the south and at lower elevations, were under consideration as was Monarch Pass, the more direct route between Salida and Gunnison. In September 1938, state engineer Charles Vail decided to utilize the Monarch Pass route, but with significant reconstruction and rerouting to reduce grades, minimize tight curves, and keep the roadbed up on sunny slopes where winter snow would be easier to manage. To achieve these objectives, the road was rerouted over what was then called Agate Pass or Agate-Monarch Pass, which now serves as the third Monarch Pass.

The new U.S. Route 50 over the divide was completed, except for paving, in November 1939, and the new pass was initially designated ‘’Vail Pass’’. Area residents objected to the name, and in December 1939, Governor Ralph Carr officially designated the new pass as ‘’Monarch Pass.’’ Soon thereafter, a newly constructed pass on U.S. Route 6 crossing Colorado farther to the north was named Vail Pass.

== Weather station ==
The Federal Aviation Administration installed an automated weather station (AWOS) atop Monarch Pass, broadcasting at 124.175 MHz. It provides pilots of small aircraft access to real-time weather conditions near the summit. Aircraft accidents in the vicinity of Monarch Pass are frequent. The high terrain and frequent storms make this route difficult for light aircraft; the pass is steep and narrow, especially when approached from the east, with a sharp turn required at the summit. Many Colorado pilots therefore advise small aircraft to avoid Monarch in favor of the lower, flatter Marshall Pass just a few miles to the south.

On February 17, 2016 at 7:36 p.m. the weather station recorded a wind gust from the west of 148 mph, the highest official gust recorded to date in the state of Colorado by the National Weather Service (NWS). It broke the previous record of 147 mph from January 25, 1971 recorded by the Center for Atmospheric Research (NCAR). These measurements were confirmed by the Colorado Division of Aeronautics and the NWS office in Pueblo, Colorado.

=== Climate ===
Porphyry Creek SNOTEL is a weather station near the summit of Monarch Pass.

Climate data for Porphyry Creek, Colorado, 1991–2020 normals: 10760ft (3280m)
Month	Jan	Feb	Mar	Apr	May	Jun	Jul	Aug	Sep	Oct	Nov	Dec	Year
Mean daily maximum °F (°C)	27.7 (−2.4)	29.6 (−1.3)	36.3 (2.4)	43.3 (6.3)	52.0 (11.1)	62.3 (16.8)	67.0 (19.4)	64.2 (17.9)	58.0 (14.4)	47.2 (8.4)	34.7 (1.5)	26.8 (−2.9)	45.8 (7.6)
Daily mean °F (°C)	15.8 (−9.0)	17.3 (−8.2)	23.9 (−4.5)	30.2 (−1.0)	39.1 (3.9)	48.7 (9.3)	53.7 (12.1)	51.9 (11.1)	45.9 (7.7)	35.5 (1.9)	24.3 (−4.3)	15.3 (−9.3)	33.5 (0.8)
Mean daily minimum °F (°C)	3.9 (−15.6)	5.4 (−14.8)	11.2 (−11.6)	17.4 (−8.1)	26.2 (−3.2)	33.9 (1.1)	39.3 (4.1)	38.5 (3.6)	32.4 (0.2)	23.1 (−4.9)	11.9 (−11.2)	4.1 (−15.5)	20.6 (−6.3)
Average precipitation inches (mm)	2.76 (70)	2.62 (67)	2.83 (72)	3.09 (78)	2.04 (52)	0.83 (21)	1.87 (47)	2.05 (52)	1.68 (43)	1.76 (45)	2.01 (51)	2.42 (61)	25.96 (659)
Average snowfall inches (cm)	38.4 (98)	36.7 (93)	38.9 (99)	23.9 (61)	14.4 (37)	5.7 (14)	0.7 (1.8)	0.3 (0.76)	5.1 (13)	14.4 (37)	25.9 (66)	37.4 (95)	241.8 (615.56)
Source 1: XMACIS2
Source 2: NOAA (Precipitation)

== Gallery ==
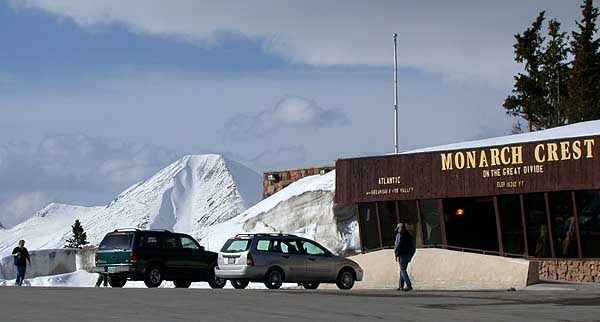
Summit of Monarch Pass in early May

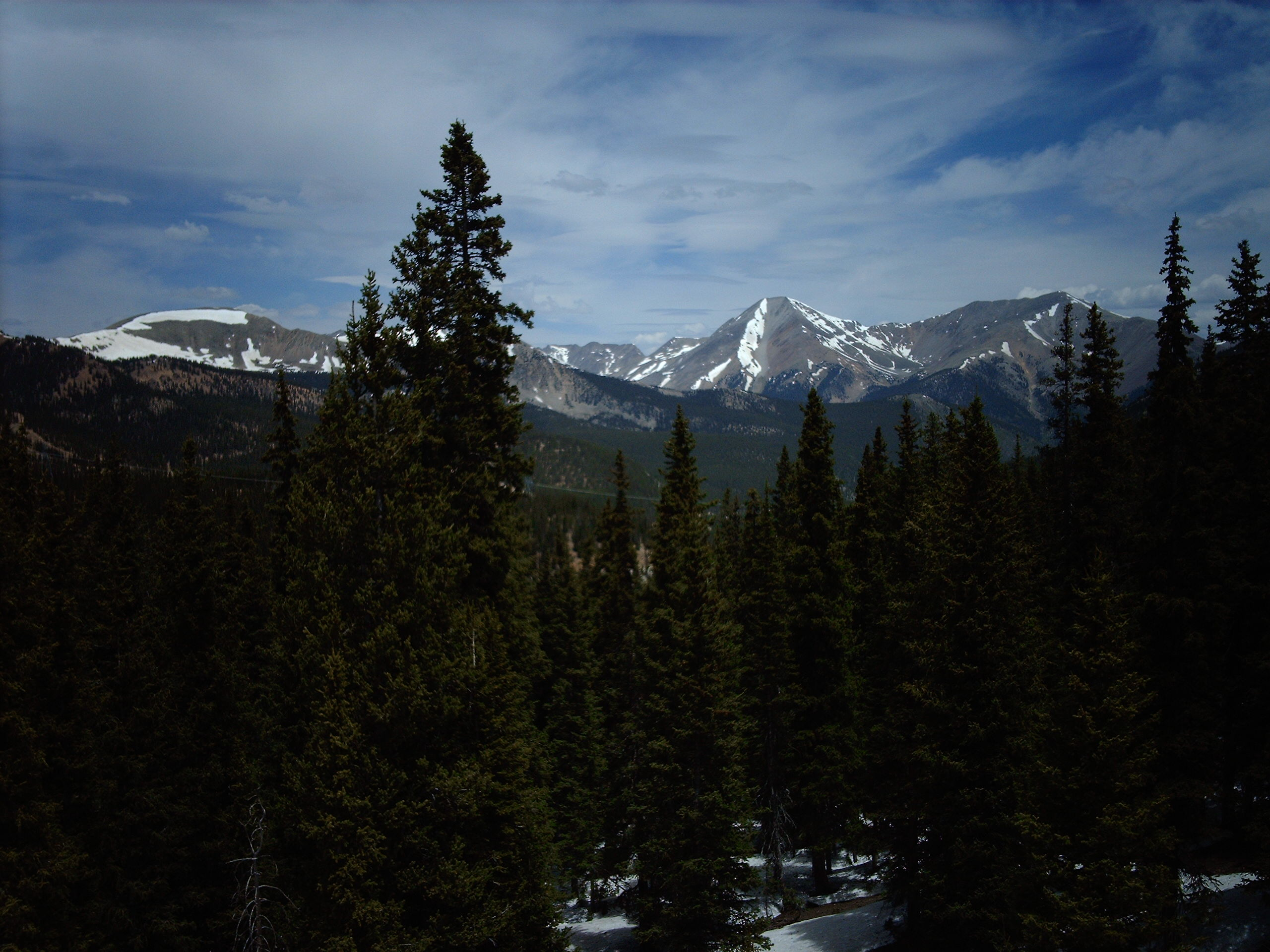
View of Mt. Aetna north of the pass

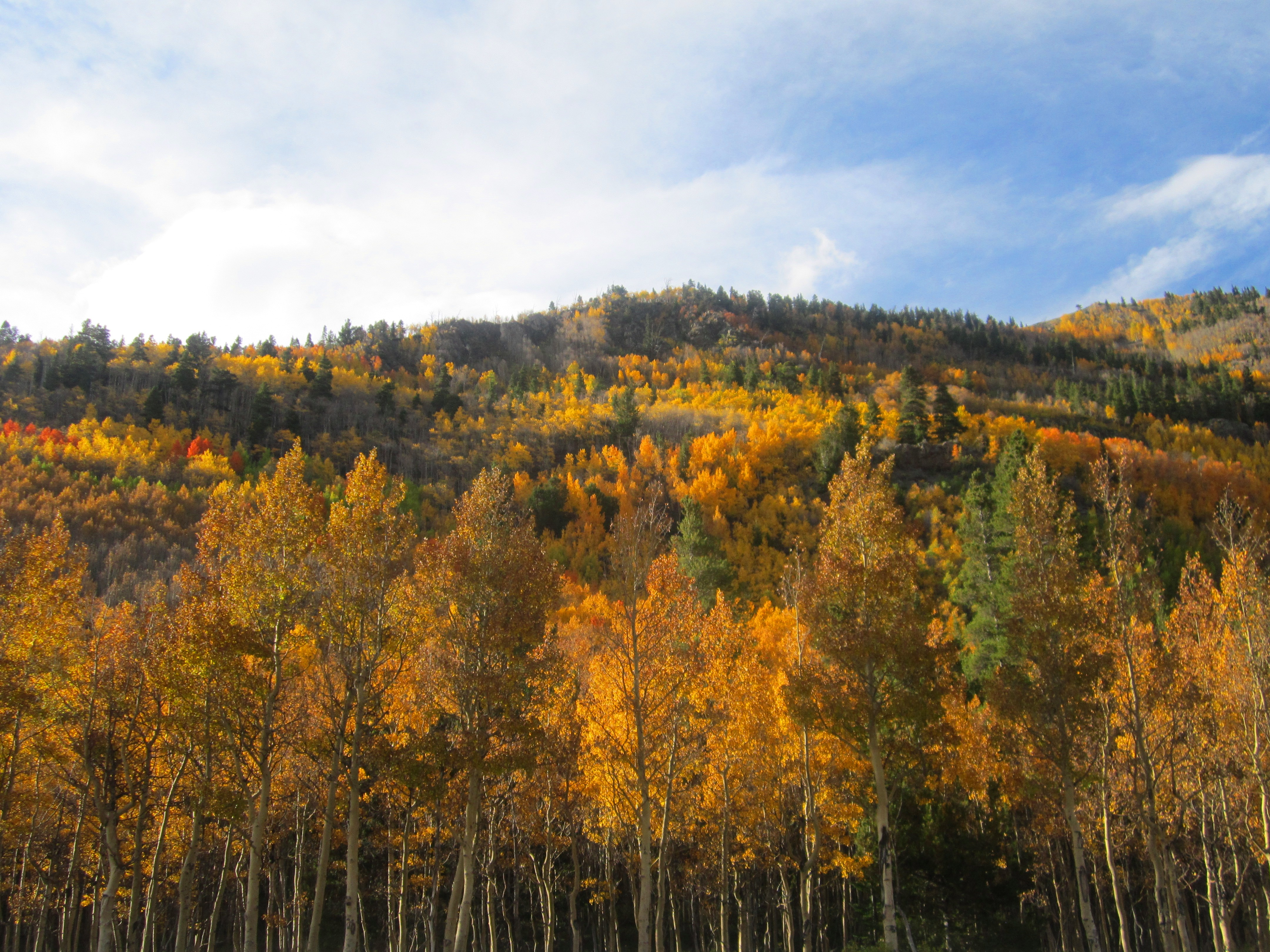
Fall colors along the pass in late September

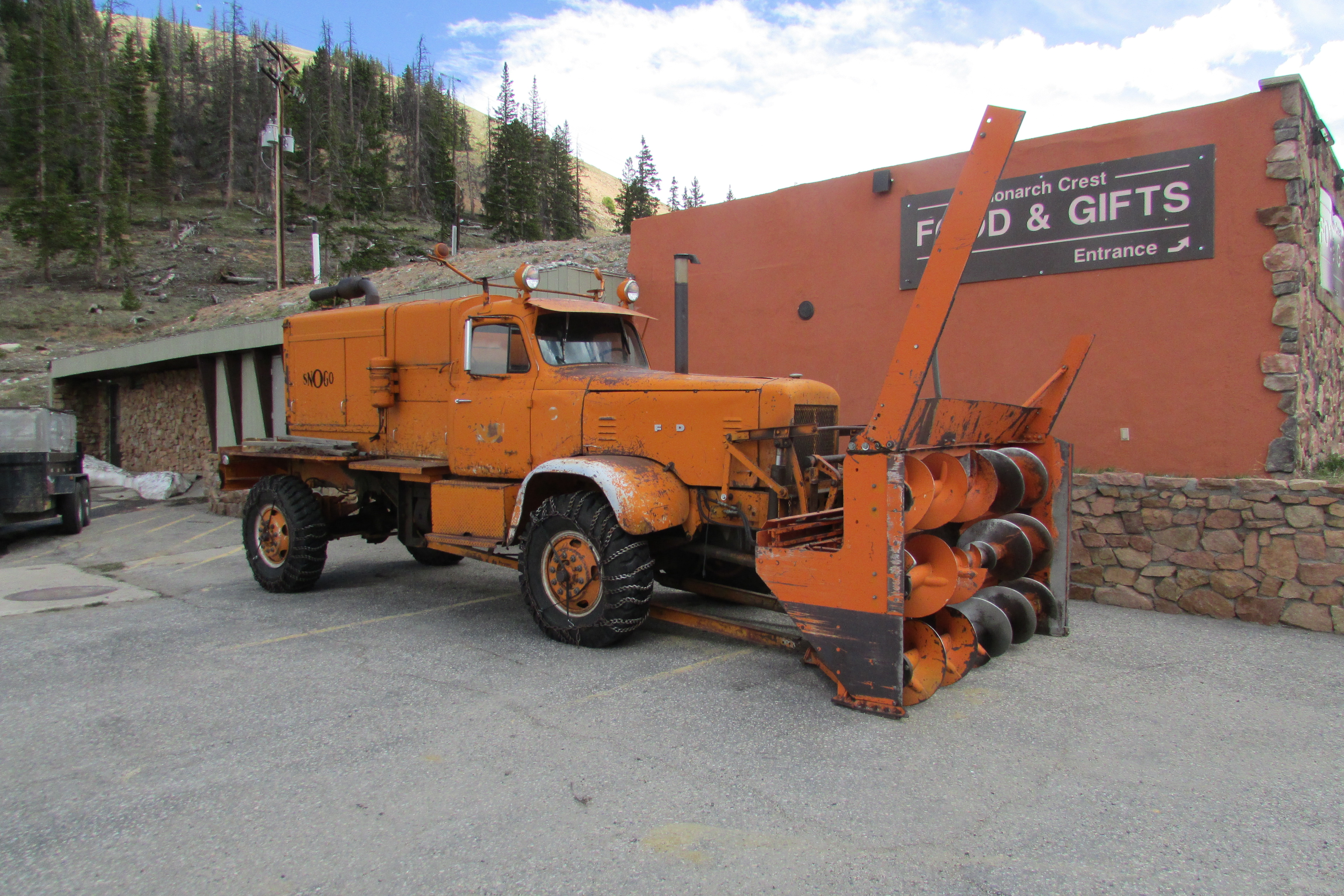
SNOGO ready with chains on at Monarch Crest

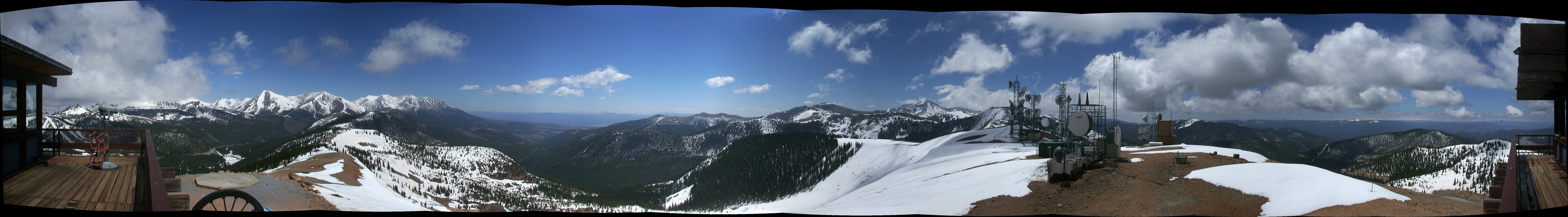
Panoramic View from the Summit
