= South Arkansas River =

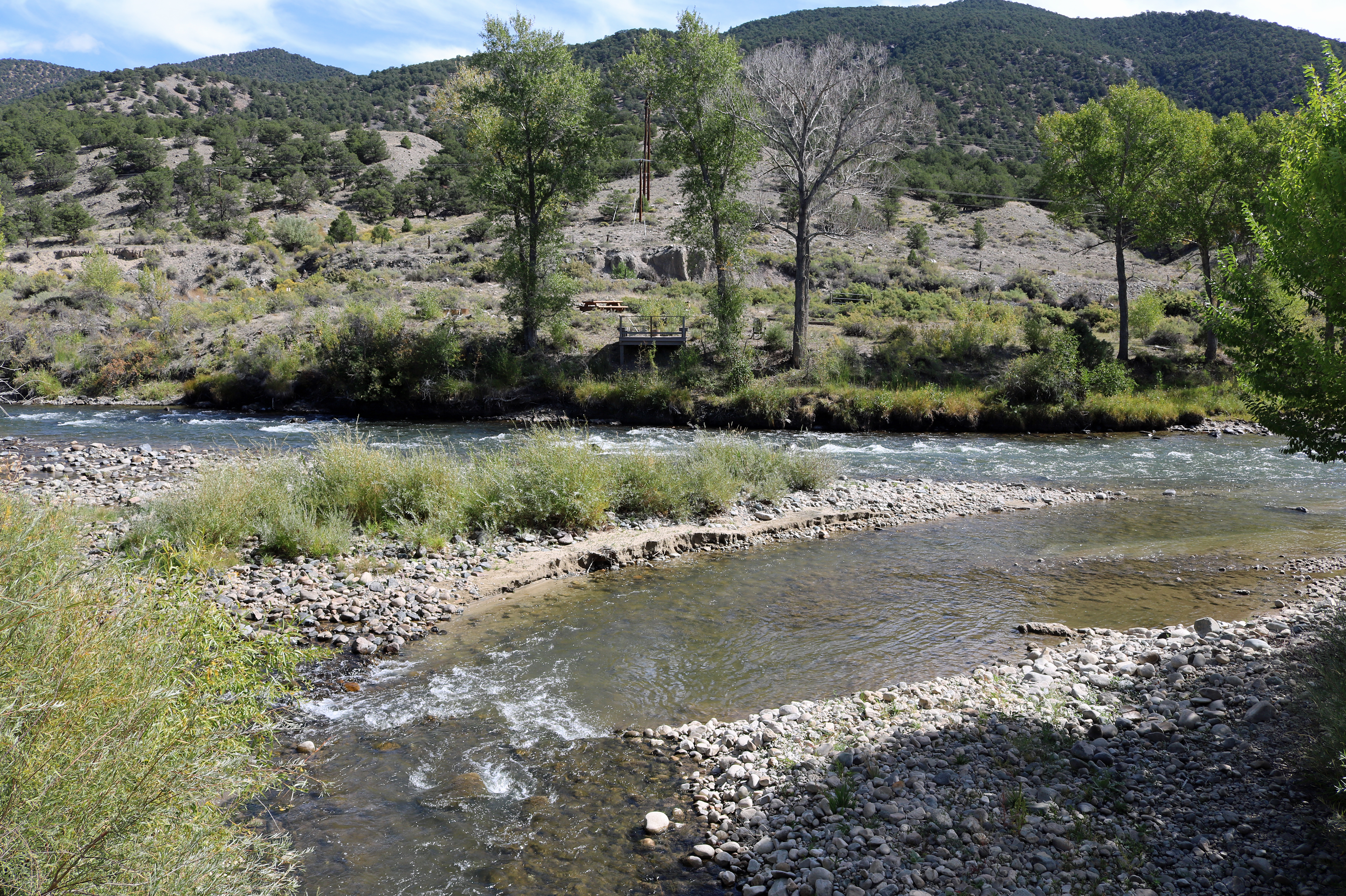
- The confluence of the South Arkansas River (bottom) with the Arkansas River.

Physical characteristics
- Source
  - coordinates: 38°29′53″N 106°19′53″W
- Mouth
  - location: Confluence with Arkansas
  - coordinates: 38°31′16″N 105°58′40″W
  - elevation: 7,001 ft (2,134 m)

Basin features
- Progression: Arkansas—Mississippi

South Arkansas River is a 24.5-mile-long (39.4 km) tributary of the Arkansas River that flows from a source near Monarch Pass in the Sawatch Range of southern Colorado. It joins the Arkansas just south of Salida, Colorado.

== See also ==
- List of rivers of Colorado
