= Sawatch Range =

Mountain range in Colorado, United States

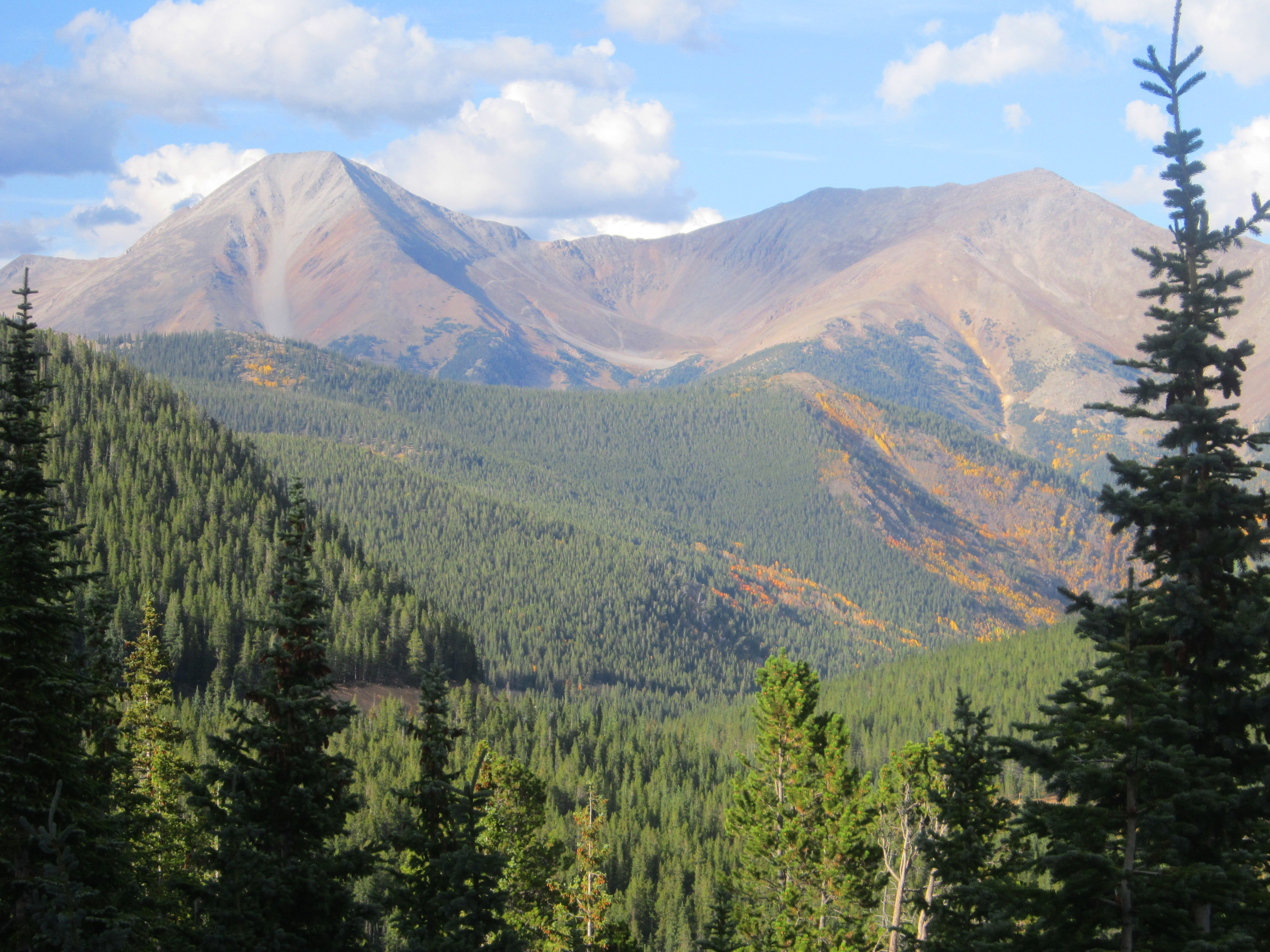
- Sawatch Range seen from Monarch Pass

Highest point
- Peak: Mount Elbert
- Elevation: 14,440 ft (4,401 m)
- Listing: Mountain ranges of Colorado
- Coordinates: 39°07′03.9″N 106°26′43.29″W

Dimensions
- Length: 80 mi (130 km) NW/SE

Geography
- Location within Colorado
- Country: United States
- State: Colorado
- Parent range: Rocky Mountains

The Sawatch Range /səˈwɑːtʃ/ or Saguache Range is a high and extensive mountain range in central Colorado which includes eight of the twenty highest peaks in the Rocky Mountains, including Mount Elbert, at 14,440 feet (4,401 m) elevation, the highest peak in the Rockies.

The range is oriented along a northwest–southeast axis, extending roughly 80 miles (130 km) from 39°37′36″N 106°32′13″W in the north to 38°5′51″N 106°3′48″W in the south. The range contains fifteen peaks in excess of 14,000 feet (4,267 m), also known as fourteeners. The range forms a part of the Continental Divide, and its eastern side drains into the headwaters of the Arkansas River. The western side of the range feeds the headwaters of the Roaring Fork River, the Eagle River, and the Gunnison River, tributaries of the Colorado River.

The Sawatch mountains in general are high, massive, and relatively gentle in contour. While some peaks are rugged enough to require technical climbing, most can be climbed by a simple, yet arduous hike. Notable summits include Mount Elbert, Mount Massive, La Plata Peak, Mount of the Holy Cross, and the Collegiate Peaks (Mounts Columbia, Harvard, Princeton, Yale, Belford, and Oxford).

State Highway 82 traverses the range at Independence Pass. It is also traversed by Cottonwood Pass, which connects the town of Buena Vista with Gunnison County. Both Independence Pass and Cottonwood Pass are over 12,000 feet (3,658 m), making them 2 of the highest passes in Colorado and are typically open only from late spring to mid autumn. Hagerman Pass is another pass to the north, connecting the Arkansas Headwaters near Leadville with the upper valley of the Fryingpan River. Hagerman Pass is traversable with four-wheel drive vehicles and on foot during summer and early autumn months. The range contains numerous hiking trails within the San Isabel National Forest and White River National Forest.

== Prominent peaks ==
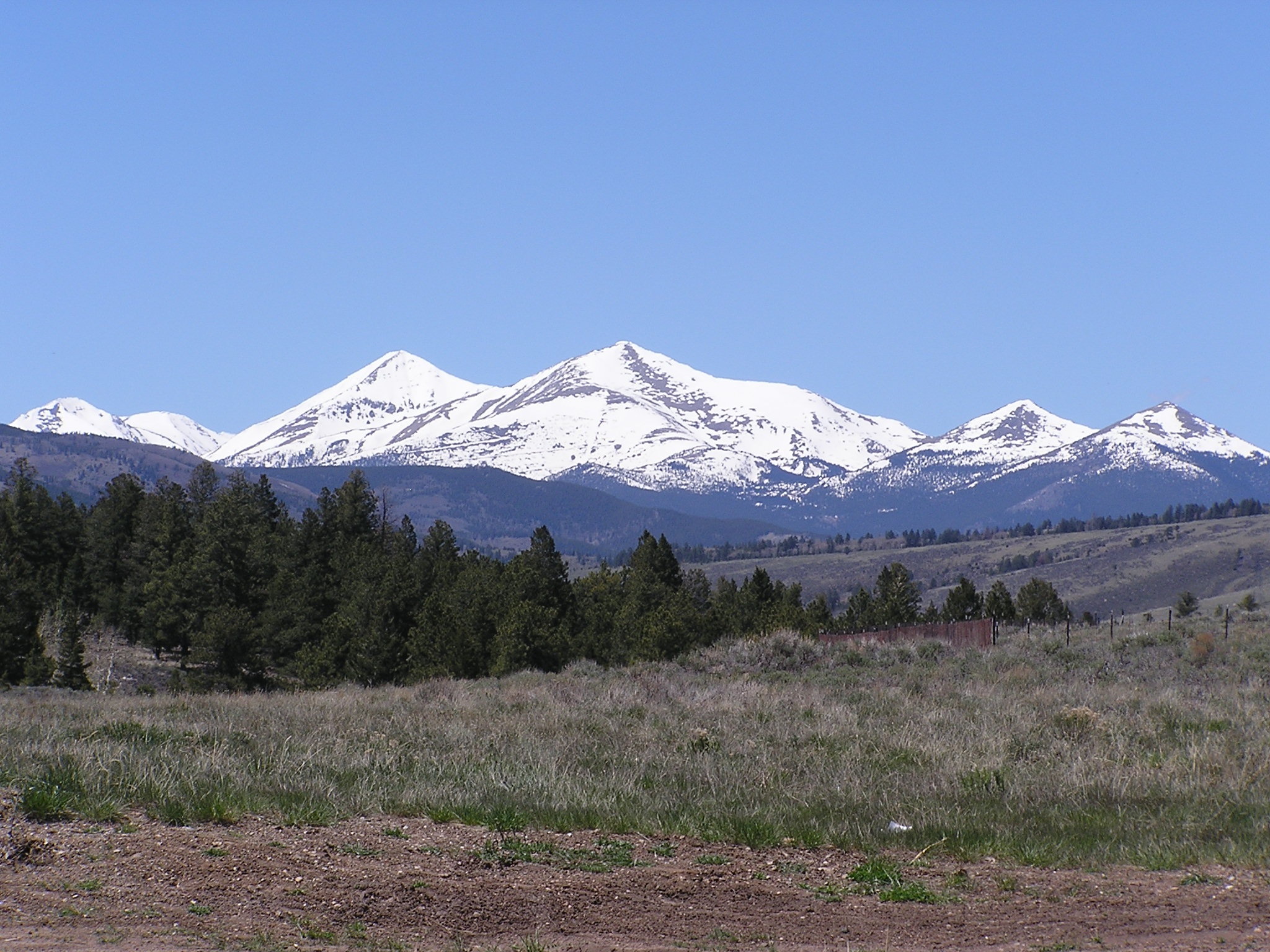
Mt. Aetna (13,746 feet (4,190 m)) and Taylor Mtn.

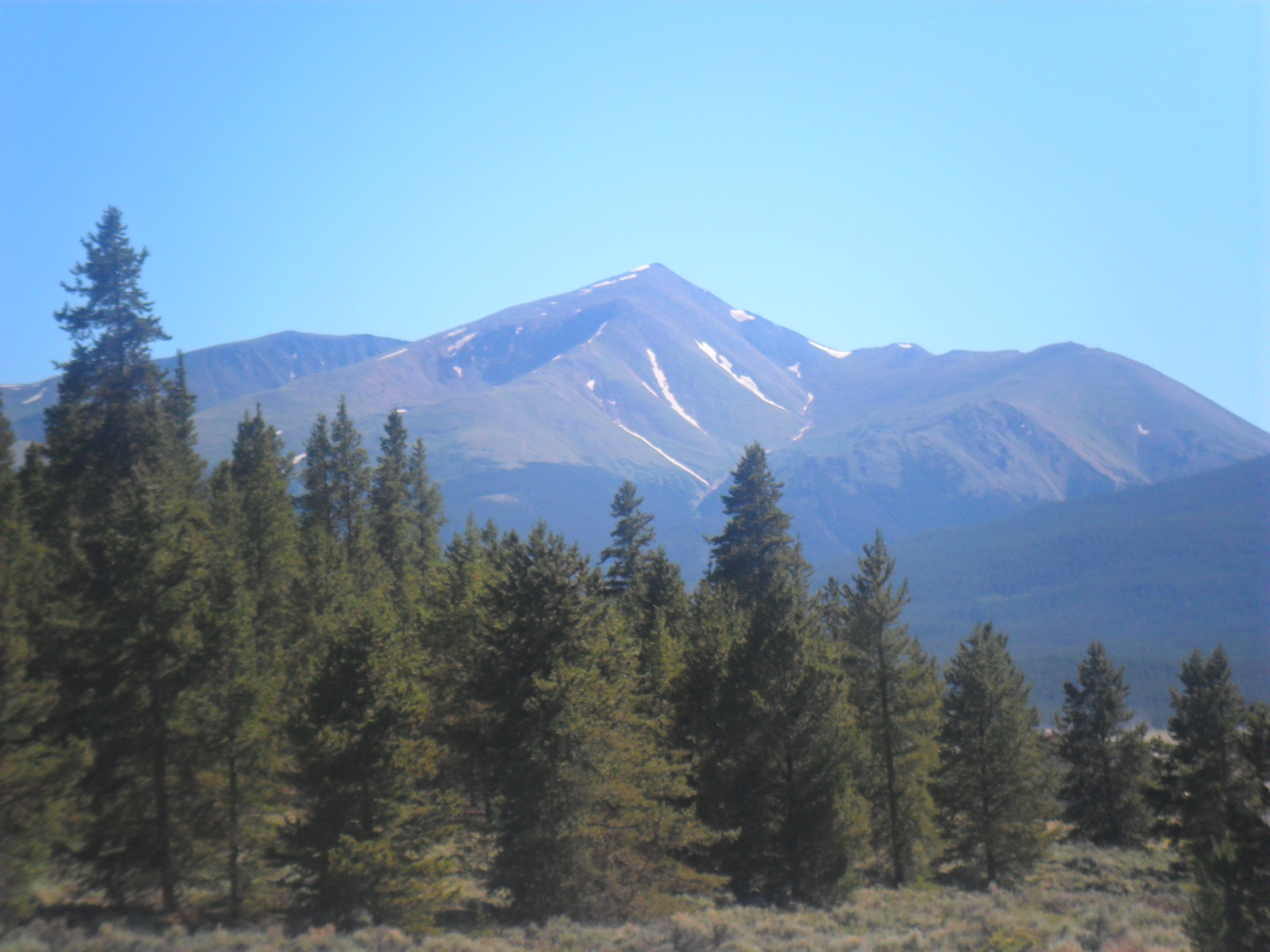
Mount Elbert, the highest peak in the Rocky Mountains.

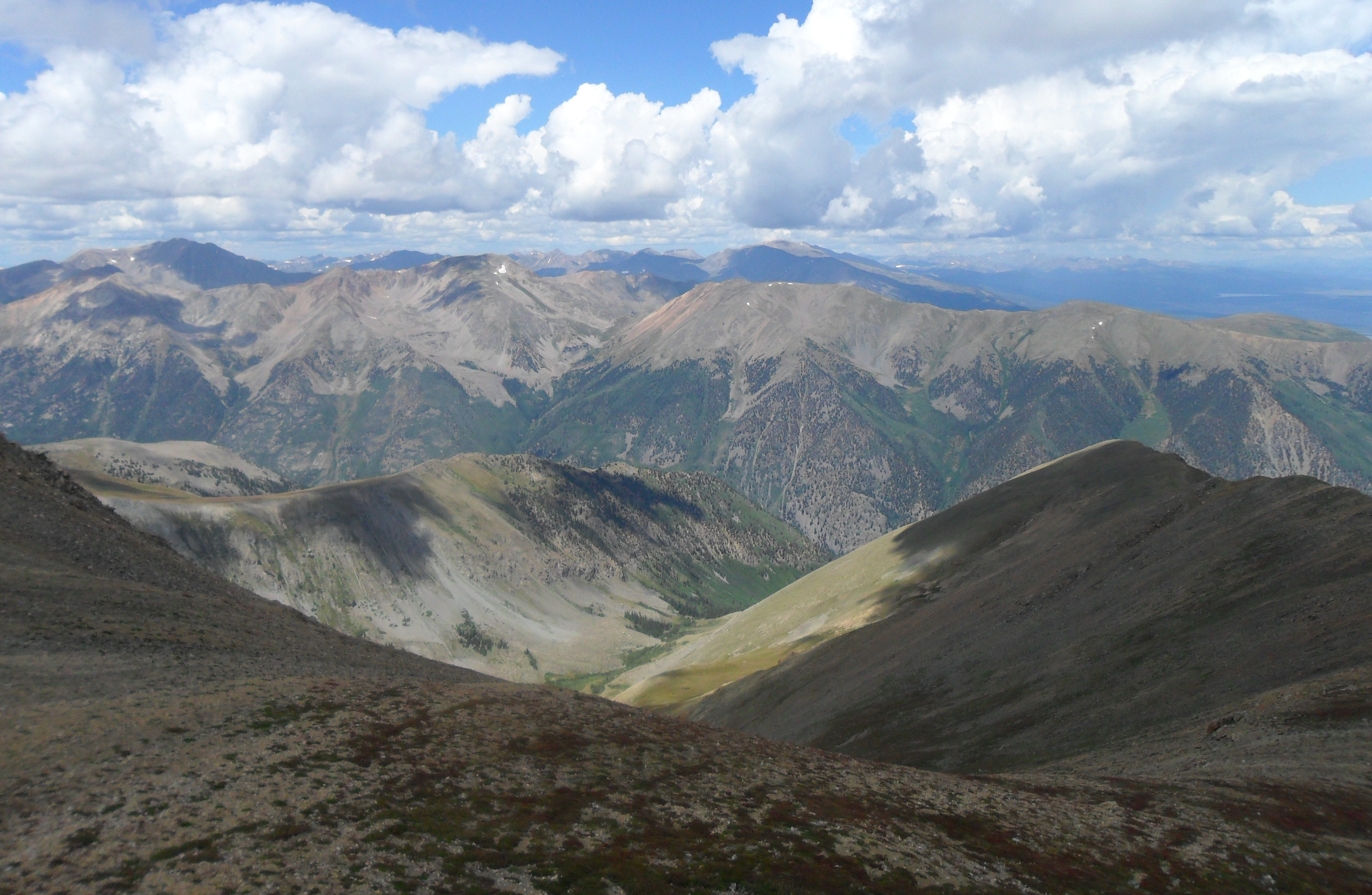
Sawatch Range near Buena Vista, Colorado.

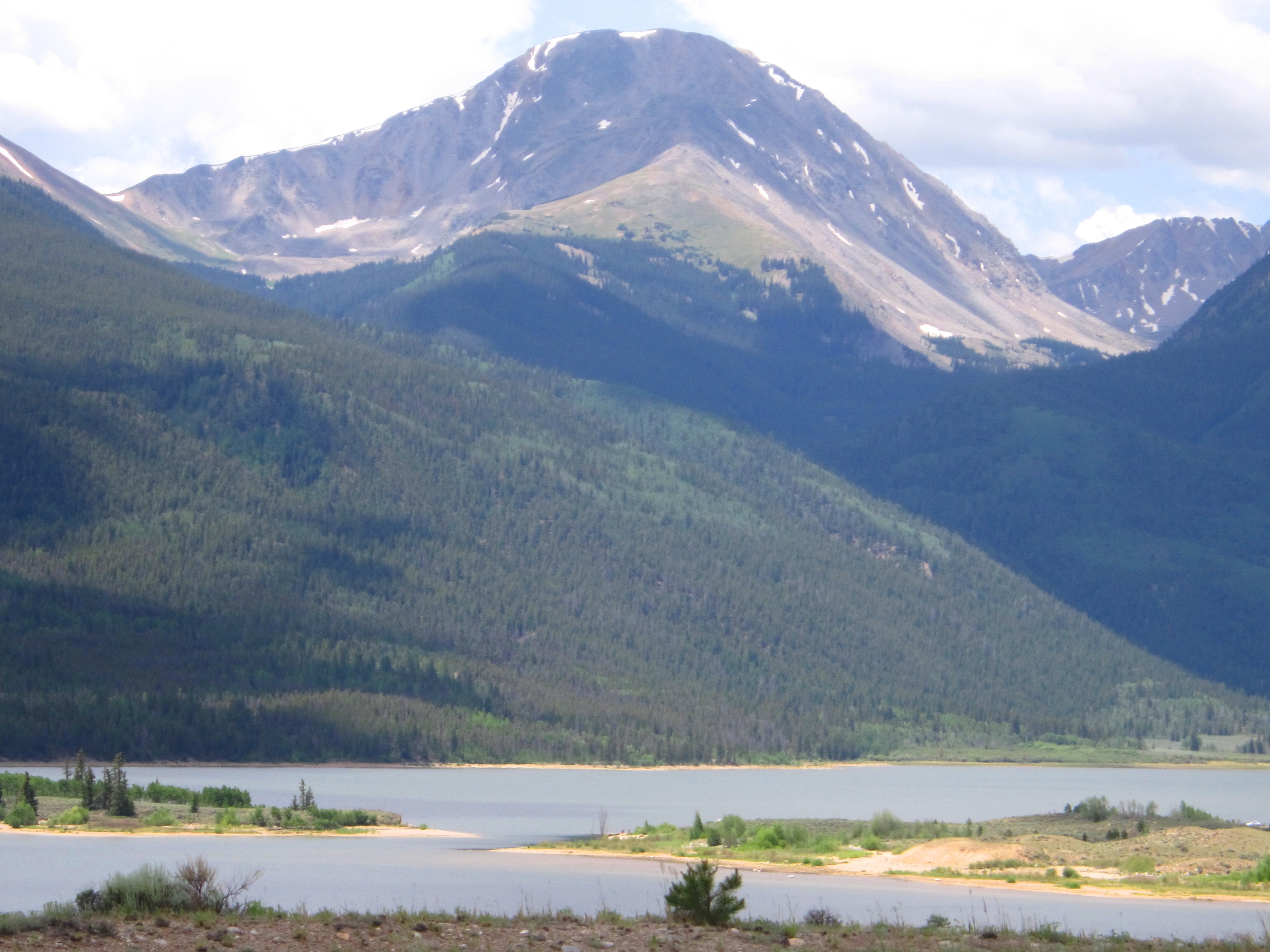
Sawatch Range near Twin Lakes.

The 18 Mountain Peaks of the Sawatch Range With At Least 500 Meters of Topographic Prominence
Rank	Mountain Peak	Elevation	Prominence	Isolation
1	Mount Elbert NGS	14,440 feet 4401 m	9,093 feet 2772 m	670.6 miles 1079.2 km
2	Mount Massive	14,428 feet 4398 m	1,941 feet 592 m	5.1 miles 8.2 km
3	Mount Harvard NGS	14,421 feet 4395 m	2,327 feet 709 m	14.9 miles 24.0 km
4	La Plata Peak	14,343 feet 4372 m	1,841 feet 561 m	6.3 miles 10.1 km
5	Mount Antero NGS	14,276 feet 4351 m	2,503 feet 763 m	17.7 miles 28.6 km
6	Mount Princeton NGS	14,204 feet 4329 m	2,177 feet 664 m	5.2 miles 8.4 km
7	Mount Yale NGS	14,202 feet 4329 m	1,876 feet 572 m	5.5 miles 8.9 km
8	Mount of the Holy Cross NGS	14,011 feet 4271 m	2,111 feet 643 m	18.5 miles 29.8 km
9	Grizzly Peak NGS	13,995 feet 4266 m	1,908 feet 582 m	6.8 miles 10.9 km
10	Mount Ouray NGS	13,961 feet 4255 m	2,659 feet 810 m	13.6 miles 21.9 km
11	Mount Jackson PB	13,676 feet 4169 m	1,810 feet 552 m	3.2 miles 5.2 km
12	Bill Williams Peak PB	13,389 feet 4081 m	1,682 feet 513 m	4.0 miles 6.5 km
13	Antora Peak PB	13,275 feet 4046 m	2,409 feet 734 m	6.7 miles 10.9 km
14	Henry Mountain PB	13,261 feet 4042 m	1,674 feet 510 m	11.5 miles 18.6 km
15	Park Cone PB	12,106 feet 3690 m	2,040 feet 622 m	3.4 miles 5.5 km
16	Red Table Mountain PB	12,043 feet 3671 m	2,017 feet 615 m	10.3 miles 16.6 km
17	Tomichi Dome PB	11,471 feet 3496 m	2,325 feet 709 m	13.3 miles 21.4 km
18	Castle Peak PB	11,285 feet 3440 m	3,040 feet 927 m	18.9 miles 30.5 km

== See also ==
- Southern Rocky Mountains
- Missouri Lakes Trail
- Collegiate Peaks
