= Timeline of Colorado history =

Coordinates: 38.9972°N 105.5478°W

This timeline is a chronology of significant events in the history of the U.S. State of Colorado and the historical area now occupied by the state.

Ancient 1500s 1600s 1700s 1800s Territory Statehood 1900s 2000s

== Ancient ==
- c. 11,500 BCE — During the Allerød oscillation, Paleoamericans from Beringia begin using the ice-free corridor east of the Rocky Mountains to migrate throughout North America. New research indicates the Colorado region may have been visited much earlier via the Pacific Ocean.
- c. 8670 BCE — Paleoamericans of the Folsom culture camp at the Lindenmeier site in present-day Larimer County.
- c. 4900 BCE — Paleoamericans camp at the Magic Mountain site near Golden.
- c. 2140 BCE — The Dotsero Volcano erupts, the most recent volcanic eruption in the future State of Colorado.
- c. 550 — Ancestral Puebloans move onto Mesa Verde.
- c. 1100 — Ancestral Puebloans begin construction of cliff houses on Mesa Verde.
- c. 1150 — The Slumgullion Earthflow dams the Lake Fork to form Lake San Cristobal, presently the second largest natural lake in Colorado.
- 1275–1300 — A prolonged drought on the Colorado Plateau forces many Ancestral Puebloans to migrate southeast into the Rio Grande Valley.
- 1300–1525 — Jicarilla Apache migrate to the southern extent of the Rocky Mountains from Alaska and Northwestern Canada.

== 1490s ==
- October 12, 1492 — Genoese seaman Christopher Columbus (Cristòffa Cómbo) lands on the Taíno island of Guanahani in the Bahamas which he renames San Salvador and claims for Queen Isabel I of Castile and the King Fernando II of Aragon. This begins the Spanish conquest of the Americas.
- May 4, 1493 — After receiving accounts of the voyage of Columbus, Pope Alexander VI (born Roderic de Borja in Valencia) issues the papal bull Inter Caetera that splits the non-Christian world into two halves for Christian exploration, conquest, conversion, and exploitation. The eastern half goes to the King of Portugal and the western half (including almost all of the Americas) goes to the Queen of Castile and the King of Aragon. The indigenous peoples of the Americas have no idea that any of these people exist.

== 1510s ==
- September 29, 1513 — Spanish conquistador Vasco Núñez de Balboa crosses the Isthmus of Panama and arrives on the shore of a sea that he names Mar del Sur (the South Sea, later named the Pacific Ocean). He claims the sea and all adjacent lands for the Queen of Castile. This includes the portion of the future State of Colorado west of the Continental Divide of the Americas.
- Autumn 1519 — A Spanish naval expedition along the northeastern coast of Mexico charts the mouths of several rivers including the Río de Nuestra Señora (Rio Grande).

== 1520s ==
- August 13, 1520 — Spanish conquistador Hernán Cortés defeats Aztec Emperor Cuauhtémoc, seizes Tenochtitlán, and proclaims the establishment of Nueva España (New Spain).

== 1540s ==
- 1540
  - February 23 — Francisco Vásquez de Coronado, Governor of Nueva Galicia, departs Compostela, México commanding a Spanish military expedition of 400 soldiers and 1,300 to 2,000 Mexican Indian allies in search of the Seven Cities of Cibola.
  - July 7 — The military expedition led by Francisco Vásquez de Coronado, reaches the Zuni pueblo of Hawikuh. The Zuni resist but are driven off by the Spanish soldiers.
  - autumn — The military expedition led by Francisco Vásquez de Coronado, reaches the Tiwa pueblos along the Río Bravo (Rio Grande). The expedition occupies several of the pueblos.
- 1541
  - spring — The Spanish military expedition led by Francisco Vásquez de Coronado leaves the Tiwa pueblos and searches the Great Plains for Quivira. The expedition may, or may not, have crossed the southeast corner of the present U.S. State of Colorado.
  - June 28 — A Spanish military expedition led by Hernando de Soto, Governor of Cuba, become the first Europeans to cross the Mississippi River.
  - winter — The Tiwa resist the occupation by the Coronado expedition, but hundreds are killed in the Tiguex War.

== 1590s ==
- July 12, 1598 — Don Juan de Oñate Salazar establishes the New Spain (Nueva España) colony of Santa Fe de Nuevo Méjico at the village of San Juan de los Caballeros adjacent to the Ohkay Owingeh Pueblo at the confluence of the Rio Grande (río Bravo) and the río Chama. At its greatest extent, the colony encompassed all of the present U.S. state of New Mexico and portions of Arizona, Utah, Colorado, Wyoming, Nebraska, Kansas, Oklahoma, Texas, and the Mexican state of Chihuahua. (Note: At its greatest territorial extent, the Spanish Empire claimed that the border of its colony of New Mexico (Santa Fe de Nuevo México) began where the 31st parallel north crossed 100th meridian west, thence north along the 100th meridian west to the 42nd parallel north, thence west along the 42nd parallel north to the Green River (río Español), thence down the Green River to its confluence with the Colorado River (río Colorado), thence down the Colorado River to its confluence with the Gila River (río Gila), thence up the Gila River up to its confluence with its East Fork and West Fork, thence south along the meridian 108°12′22″ west to the 31st parallel north, thence east along the 31st parallel north back to the 100th meridian west.)

== 1680s ==
- August 13, 1680 — Tewa shaman Popé of Ohkay Owingeh leads the Pueblo Revolt against the Spanish rulers of Santa Fe de Nuevo Méjico. The Spanish settlers flee down the Rio Grande to El Paso del Norte.
- April 9, 1682 — René-Robert Cavelier, Sieur de La Salle, claims the Mississippi River and its watershed for the Kingdom of France and names the region La Louisiane in honor of French King Louis XIV. The Mississippi Basin is later determined to be the fourth most extensive on Earth and includes lands inhabited by hundreds of thousands of native peoples and lands previously claimed by Spain, France, and England. The Louisiane claim includes all land in the future State of Colorado east of the Continental Divide of the Americas and the Sangre de Cristo Mountains. This will set up a rivalry among native peoples, France, Spain, and eventually the United States in the area.

== 1690s ==
- September 14, 1692 — Diego de Vargas Zapata y Luján Ponce de León y Contreras completes the reconquest of the Spanish colony of Santa Fe de Nuevo Méjico to end the Pueblo Revolt.

== 1700s ==
- May 1, 1707 — The Treaty of Union takes effect uniting the Kingdom of England and the Kingdom of Scotland as the Kingdom of Great Britain.

== 1720s ==
- August 6, 1720 — A Spanish expedition led by Don Pedro de Villasur seeking information about the French in the area reaches the South Platte River, called by the Spanish the Río Jesús María. They continued northeast into Nebraska where the expedition was largely destroyed in an attack by a group of Pawnee people on 14 August.

== 1730s ==
- July 5, 1739 — On a voyage up the Arkansas River to the confluence of the Purgatoire River (in the future State of Colorado), Pierre Antoine and Paul Mallet encounter an Arikara man who agrees to guide them to Santa Fe. This is the first contact between France and Spain in the Rocky Mountain region.

== 1760s ==
- 1762
  - November 23 — Fearing the loss of all his North American territories as a result of the Seven Years' War (the French and Indian War in North America), King Louis XV of France makes the secret Treaty of Fontainebleau transferring La Louisiane to his cousin King Carlos III of Spain.
- 1763
  - September 30 — The Treaty of Paris is signed ending the Seven Years' War and the French and Indian War. The Kingdom of Great Britain acquires the land east of the Mississippi River.
- 1764
  - September 30 — The secret Treaty of Fontainebleau is proclaimed. This ends the competition between France and Spain on the Great Plains.
- 1765
  - July — Governor Tomás Vélez Cachupin of Santa Fe de Nuevo México dispatches an expedition led by Juan Maria Antonio Rivera to explore the San Juan Mountains and the Colorado Plateau.

== 1770s ==
- 1776
  - July 4 — Representatives of the thirteen United States of America sign the Declaration of Independence from the Kingdom of Great Britain.
  - July 29 — A Spanish-Franciscan expedition led by Franciscan priests Francisco Atanasio Domínguez and Silvestre Vélez de Escalante sets out from La Villa Real de la Santa Fé de San Francisco de Asís (Santa Fe) in search of an overland route to the Presidio Reál de San Carlos de Monterey (Monterey). The expedition follows the 1765 route of Juan Rivera northwest across the Colorado Plateau. The expedition fails to reach Las Californias, but reaches the lower Paria River in the future State of Arizona before returning to Santa Fe.
- 1778 — Bernardo de Miera y Pacheco, cartographer for the Dominguez–Escalante Expedition, publishes his map of the expedition across the Colorado Plateau. His map becomes the foundation of a future trade route later known as the Old Spanish Trail.

== 1780s ==
- 1783
  - September 3 — The Treaty of Paris is signed in Paris by representatives of King George III of Great Britain and representatives of the United States of America. The treaty affirms the independence of the United States and sets the Mississippi River as its western boundary.
- 1789
  - March 4 — The new Constitution of the United States takes effect as the 1st United States Congress convenes.

== 1790s ==
- 1792
  - October 3 — French frontiersman Pierre "Pedro" Vial arrives in Saint-Louis from the Spanish settlement of Santa Fe. The route he followed will become the Cimarron Branch of the Santa Fe Trail.

== 1800s ==
- 1800
  - October 1 — Seeking to restore French presence in the Americas, French First Consul Napoléon Bonaparte pressures King Carlos IV of Spain to agree to the secret Third Treaty of San Ildefonso to transfer La Luisiana to the French Republic in exchange for French claims in Tuscany.
- 1801
  - March 21 — The French Republic and the Spanish Empire sign the Treaty of Aranjuez setting the terms for the "restoration of La Louisiane to France."
- 1803
  - April 30 — The United States and the French Republic sign the Louisiana Purchase Treaty. Wishing to guarantee American navigation rights on the Mississippi River, U.S. President Thomas Jefferson had offered to purchase the Mississippi River port of New Orleans from the French Republic. Concerned with the potential cost of future campaigns, French First Consul Napoléon Bonaparte countered with an offer to sell the entire territory of La Louisiane to the United States for 80 million French francs or $15 million U.S. dollars.
  - November 30 — Spanish Governor Juan Manuel de Salcedo transfers control of La Luisiana to French Governor Pierre Clement de Laussat in a ceremony at Nueva Orleans (New Orleans). This formal transfer of power was made solely to accommodate the Louisiana Purchase.
  - December 20 — French Governor Pierre Clement de Laussat transfers control of La Louisiane to U.S. Governor William Claiborne in a ceremony at La Nouvelle-Orléans (New Orleans) only 20 days after the transfer of Spanish control. The United States and Spain disagree over the western boundary of the territory. The United States maintains that Louisiana includes the Mississippi River and its entire western drainage basin. Spain maintains that its territory includes (1) all land west of the Continental Divide of the Americas including Alta California, and (2) all land south of the Arkansas River and west of the Medina River including Santa Fe de Nuevo México, and (3) all land south of the Red River and west of the Calcasieu River including Tejas. The area in dispute includes land in the future State of Colorado southwest of the Arkansas River but east of both the Continental Divide and the Sangre de Cristo Divide.
- 1804
  - March 26 — U.S. President Thomas Jefferson signs An Act erecting Louisiana into two territories, and providing for the temporary government thereof. The portion of the Louisiana Purchase north of the 33rd parallel north is designated the military District of Louisiana.
  - October 1 — The District of Louisiana is reorganized under the jurisdiction of the Territory of Indiana.
- 1805
  - March 3 — U.S. President Thomas Jefferson signs An Act further providing for the government of the district of Louisiana. The District of Louisiana is reorganized as the self-governing Territory of Louisiana. The Territory of Louisiana includes all land in the future State of Colorado in the Mississippi River watershed including the disputed area southwest of the Arkansas River.
- 1806
  - November 15 — A U.S. Army reconnaissance expedition led by Captain Zebulon Pike first sights the "great summit" of the "Mexican Mountains" that will later bear his name.
  - November 27 — Zebulon Pike abandons his attempt to climb the summit of the Mexican Mountains (Southern Rocky Mountains) now known as Pikes Peak. Pike will later write that the mountain "may be the highest on Earth". (Twenty-nine peaks are higher in Colorado alone.)
- 1807
  - February 26 — Spanish cavalrymen arrest the U.S. Army reconnaissance expedition led by Captain Zebulon Pike in the San Luis Valley. The reconnaissance party will be taken to Santa Fe, then Chihuahua, before being expelled from Nueva España on July 1, 1807.

== 1810s ==
- 1810
  - Zebulon Pike publishes The expeditions of Zebulon Montgomery Pike to Headwaters of the Mississippi River, through Louisiana Territory, and in New Spain, during the Years 1805-6-7. His journals will become a popular guide to the Upper Mississippi Basin, the Great Plains, and the Southern Rocky Mountains.
  - August 1 — Mexican priest Miguel Gregorio Antonio Ignacio Hidalgo-Costilla y Gallaga Mandarte Villaseñor (Hidalgo) proclaims the independence of Mexico from the Napoleonic Kingdom of Spain in the village of Dolores.
- 1812
  - June 4 — U.S. President James Madison signs An Act providing for the government of the territory of Missouri. The Territory of Louisiana is renamed the Territory of Missouri.
- 1819
  - February 22 — The United States and the restored Kingdom of Spain sign the Adams–Onís Treaty (Note: In Colorado, the border set by the Adams–Onís Treaty between the United States and the Spanish Empire extended up the Arkansas River to its headwaters, thence north along the meridian 106°20'35" west. The United States surrendered the area in the future state south and west of the Arkansas River and east of both the Continental Divide and the Sangre de Cristo Divide. North of the headwaters of the Arkansas River, the border was moved from the Continental Divide to the meridian 106°20'35" west. The Adams–Onís border was affirmed by the Treaty of Limits between the United States and the United Mexican States.) The United States relinquishes its claim to land west of the 100th meridian west of Greenwich and south and west of the Arkansas River and south of the 42nd parallel north. Spain relinquishes Florida and all claims to land north of the 42nd parallel in North America.
  - spring — Spanish Governor Facundo Melgares orders the construction of a military fort near Sangre de Cristo Pass to block a possible invasion of Santa Fe de Nuevo México from the United States. The fort becomes the only Spanish establishment in the future State of Colorado, only to be abandoned in 1821. The U.S. invasion of Nuevo México will not occur until 1846.

== 1820s ==
- 1820
  - March 6 — U.S. President James Monroe signs the Missouri Compromise. The bill allows Missouri to become a slave state, but prohibits slavery in the western territories north of the parallel 36°30? north.
  - July 14 — Edwin James and two other members of a U.S. Army expedition led by Major Stephen Long make the first recorded (White) ascent of Pikes Peak. Major Long names the mountain James Peak.
- 1821
  - February 22 — The Adams–Onís Treaty of 1819 takes effect. The United States relinquishes all land in the future State of Colorado southwest of the Arkansas River or west of the meridian 106°20'35" west. The rest of the future state remains part of the Territory of Missouri.
  - March 2 — U.S. President James Monroe signs An Act to authorize the people of the Missouri territory to form a constitution and state government, and for the admission of such state into the Union on an equal footing with the original states, and to prohibit slavery in certain territories.
  - August 10 — U.S. President James Monroe certified that the conditions for statehood had been fulfilled and issued Proclamation 28 — Admitting Missouri into the Union. The remaining northwestern portion of the Territory of Missouri becomes unorganized territory.
  - August 24 — The Spanish Empire signs the Treaty of Córdoba recognizing the independence of the Mexican Empire. The Spanish portion of the future state becomes part of the Mexican territory of Santa Fe de Nuevo México, although there is no permanent Mexican presence north of the 37th parallel north.
  - September 1 — William Becknell and a party of frontier traders leave New Franklin, Missouri bound for Santa Fe by way of the upper Arkansas and Purgatoire rivers. The Becknell route will become the Mountain Branch of the Santa Fe Trail.
  - December 26 — Spanish Governor Facundo Melgares receives orders that Santa Fe de Nuevo México is now an intendance of the Mexican Empire. Melgares swears fealty to the empire and becomes the first Mexican Governor of Santa Fe de Nuevo México.
- 1828
  - January 12 — The United States and the United Mexican States sign the Treaty of Limits, affirming the border established between the United States and the Spanish Empire by the Adams–Onís Treaty.

== 1830s ==
- 1833
  - spring — Frontier trader William Bent establishes Bent's Fort on the north bank of the Arkansas River, the United States-Mexico border. The fort serves fur traders and travelers on the Santa Fe Trail. The fort is the first American establishment in the future State of Colorado.
- 1835
  - spring — Frontier traders Louis Vasquez and Andrew Sublette establish Fort Vasquez on the South Platte River.
  - October 2 — The Texian Revolt begins with the Battle of Gonzales.
- 1836
  - spring — Frontier trader Lancaster Lupton establishes Fort Lancaster on the South Platte River 12 miles (19 km) upstream from Saint Vrain Creek.
  - March 2 — Texians, Anglo-American immigrants in the Mexican state of Coahuila y Tejas, declare their independence as the Republic of Texas.
  - May 14 — Texians force captured General Santa Anna to sign the coerced Treaties of Velasco recognizing the independence of the Republic of Texas. Mexico neither acknowledges nor ratifies these treaties. Based upon these treaties, the Republic of Texas claims as its eastern and northern border the Adams–Onís border with the United States and as its western and southern border the Rio Grande to its headwaters, thence north along meridian 107°32?35? west to the Adams–Onís border with the United States. (Note: The Republic of Texas claimed as its eastern and northern border the Adams–Onís border with the United States and as its western and southern border the Rio Grande to its headwaters, thence north along meridian 107°32?35? west to the Adams–Onís border with the United States. The western extent of this claim was dubious since the Republic of Texas never occupied any territory west of the 102nd meridian west. This claim included half of the Mexican province of Santa Fe de Nuevo México, established centuries before in 1598.) The disputed region will later become portions of the future U.S. states of Wyoming, Colorado, Kansas, Oklahoma, Texas, and New Mexico.
- 1837
  - spring — Frontier trader Ceran de Hault de Lassus de Saint Vrain establishes Fort Saint Vrain at the confluence of the South Platte River with Saint Vrain Creek.
  - spring — Frontier traders Peter A. Sarpy and Henry Fraeb establish Fort Jackson on the South Platte River for the American Fur Company.
  - March 6 — U.S. Secretary of State John Forsyth accepts the credentials of William H. Wharton as Republic of Texas Minister to the United States of America. Mexico protests the United States recognition of the Republic of Texas as a violation of the Treaty of Limits of 1828.
- 1838
  - October 6 — The American Fur Company closes Fort Jackson. The fort is destroyed to prevent its use by competitors.

== 1840s ==
- 1842
  - June 10 — U.S. Army Lieutenant John C. Frémont, guide Kit Carson, and cartographer Charles Preuss begin a two-year survey of the High Plains. Maps created by the survey will become guides for the South Platte Trail.
- 1845
  - December 29 — U.S. President James K. Polk signs the Joint resolution for the admission of the State of Texas into the Union. The Mexican Republic asserts that the annexation is a violation of the Treaty of Limits. This dispute will lead to the Mexican–American War.
- 1846
  - February 14 — The State of Texas cedes the territorial claims of the Republic of Texas to the United States. The boundaries of the State of Texas within that territory remain undefined. The United States now claims the Rio Grande as its border with Mexico.
  - April 25 — The Thornton Affair becomes the first skirmish of the Mexican–American War.
  - May 13 — U.S. President James K. Polk signs An act providing for the prosecution of the existing war between the United States and the Republic of Mexico.
  - July 31 — General Stephen Kearny stages troops of the Army of the West at Bent's Fort for an invasion of Santa Fe de Nuevo México.
  - August 18 — The 1,700 man Army of the West under the command of Brigadier General Stephen Kearny seizes the Nuevo México capital of Santa Fe with little resistance. General Kearny assumes command as the first U.S. military governor of New Mexico.
  - September 22 — General Stephen Kearny appoints Charles Bent as the first U.S. civilian governor of New Mexico.
  - September 25 — General Stephen Kearny and troops depart for California. Colonel Sterling Price assumes command as the second U.S. military governor of New Mexico.
- 1847
  - January 19 — U.S. civilian governor Charles Bent is killed by a band of insurgents at his home in Taos. First Secretary Donaciano Vigil assumes office as the second U.S. civilian governor of New Mexico.
- 1848
  - February 2 — The United States and United Mexican States sign the Treaty of Guadalupe Hidalgo to end the Mexican–American War. Mexico relinquishes all of its northern territories. All land in the future State of Colorado becomes unorganized United States territory.
  - December 22 — Ignoring a warning from guide Bill Williams, John C. Frémont's private expedition for a proposed St. Louis to San Francisco railroad along the 38th parallel north becomes mired in snow of the La Garita Mountains. Ten men and 160 mules will die in the debacle.
- 1849
  - March 10 — The Mormon settlers of the Great Salt Lake Valley form the Provisional Government of the State of Deseret. Brigham Young is elected Governor. Deseret encompasses almost all of the present U.S. states of Utah and Nevada, and portions of Oregon, Idaho, Wyoming, Colorado, New Mexico, Arizona, and California, although only the Wasatch Front was occupied. (Note: The Constitution of the State of Deseret states its boundaries as "commencing at the 33 degree of north latitude where it crosses the 108 degree of longitude west of Greenwich thence running south and west to and down the main channel of the Gila River on the northern line of Mexico and on the northern boundary of Lower California to the Pacific Ocean thence along the coast north westerly to 118 degrees 30 minutes of west longitude thence north to where said line intersects the dividing ridge of the Sierra Nevada mountains thence north along the summit of the Sierra Nevada mountains to the dividing range of mountains that separates the waters flowing into the Columbia River from the waters running into the Great Basin thence easterly along the dividing range of mountains that separates said waters flowing into the Columbia River on the north from the waters flowing into the Great Basin on the south to the summit of the Wind River chain of mountains thence south east and south by the dividing range of mountains that separate the waters flowing into the Gulf of Mexico from the waters flowing into the Gulf of California to the place of beginning as set forth in a map drawn by Charles Preuss and published by order of the Senate of the United States in 1848." This ambitious claim included the future cities of Las Vegas, Phoenix, San Diego, and Los Angeles.) Deseret served as the de facto government of the Wasatch Front until the Provisional State was dissolved on April 4, 1851.
  - March 14 — Ute warriors kill mountain man Bill Williams in the San Luis Valley following the Frémont expedition.
  - August 21 — Proprietor William Bent destroys Bent's Fort.

== 1850s ==
- 1850
  - June 22 — Georgia prospector Lewis Ralston pans about a quarter of a troy ounce (8 grams) of gold near the mouth of a creek (later named Ralston Creek) in northwestern Kansas Territory, the first recorded discovery of gold in the Rocky Mountain region. Unimpressed, his party hurries on to the California goldfields.
  - September 9 — The Territory of New Mexico and the Territory of Utah are established as part of the Compromise of 1850. U.S. President Millard Fillmore signs An Act proposing to the State of Texas the Establishment of her Northern and Western Boundaries, the Relinquishment by the said State of all Territory claimed by her exterior to said Boundaries, and of all her Claims upon the United States, and to establish a territorial Government for New Mexico. The Territory of New Mexico includes the southeastern portion of the future State of Colorado lying south of the 38th parallel north and east of the Continental Divide. President Fillmore also signs An Act to establish a Territorial Government for Utah. The Territory of Utah includes all of the future State of Colorado lying west of the Continental Divide.
- 1851
  - April 4 — The General Assembly of the State of Deseret dissolves the provisional government and yields to the Territory of Utah.
  - April 9 — The first permanent European-American settlement in the future State of Colorado is established at San Luis de la Culebra in the northern New Mexico Territory by settlers from the Taos area.
- 1852
  - January 9 — The new Territory of New Mexico creates nine original counties, including Taos County which extends into the future State of Colorado.
  - March 3 — The new Territory of Utah creates ten counties, including Great Salt Lake, Green River, Iron, Sanpete, Utah, and Washington counties which extend into the future State of Colorado.
  - June 22 — The U.S. Army establishes Fort Massachusetts in the San Luis Valley of northern New Mexico Territory, the first U.S. Army fort in the future State of Colorado.
- 1854
  - May 30 — U.S. President Franklin Pierce signs An Act to Organize the Territories of Nebraska and Kansas. This act supersedes the Missouri Compromise and provides for the voters of the territories to decide for themselves whether to permit slavery. The Territory of Kansas includes all of the future State of Colorado east of the Continental Divide and south of the 40th parallel north (the Baseline). The Territory of Nebraska includes all of the future State of Colorado east of the Continental Divide and north of the 40th parallel north. The Kansas–Nebraska Act will unwittingly lead to the American Civil War.
- 1855
  - August 25 — The Territory of Kansas creates Arapahoe County in the extreme western portion of the territory in what is now Colorado. Despite several attempts, the county is never organized.
- 1856
  - January 5 — The Territory of Utah creates Beaver County from a part of Iron County which extends into the future State of Colorado.
- 1857
  - summer — A party of Mexican-American prospectors from Taos County, New Mexico Territory dig for gold along the South Platte River below the mouth of Little Dry Creek in Arapahoe County, Kansas Territory.
- 1858
  - spring — The U.S. Army builds Fort Garland in the San Luis Valley to replace Fort Massachusetts six miles to the north.
  - spring — Antoine Janis establishes the town of Colona on the Cache la Poudre River in western Nebraska Territory.
  - July — Georgia prospectors Green Russell and Sam Bates discover a placer deposit yielding about 20 troy ounces (622 grams) of gold near the mouth of Little Dry Creek in Arapahoe County, Kansas Territory.
  - August — Prospectors from Lawrence, Kansas Territory establish the townsite of Montana City one mile (1.6 km) north of the Little Dry Creek Diggings in Arapahoe County, Kansas Territory.
  - August 26 — Gold dust from the Little Dry Creek Diggings arrives in Kansas City, precipitating the Pike's Peak Gold Rush.
  - September 24 — Prospectors from Montana City organize the St. Charles Town Company east of the Cherry Creek Diggings in Arapahoe County, Kansas Territory.
  - October 3 — A group of Georgia prospectors led by Green Russell establish the townsite of Auraria south of Cherry Creek near the Cherry Creek Diggings.
  - October 29 — Charles H. Blake and A.J. Williams open a mercantile business out of wagons in Auraria.
  - November 22 — A group of Kansas Territory speculators led by William Larimer organize the rival townsite of Denver City across Cherry Creek from Auraria on the property of the St. Charles Town Company.
- 1859
  - January 18 — The Auraria, Kansas Territory post office opens.
  - January 18 — The Saint Vrain, Nebraska Territory post office opens.
  - February 7 — The Territory of Kansas splits Arapahoe County into the six counties of Arapahoe, Broderick, El Paso, Fremont, Montana, and Oro, and creates the new Peketon County farther east and south. The counties are never organized.
  - April 15 — Ten delegates from six communities in the Pike's Peak Country meet in convention at Dick Wooton's store in Auraria to pass resolutions to organize a proposed Provisional State of Jefferson.
  - April 22 — The Boulder, Nebraska Territory post office opens.
  - April 23 — William Byers publishes the first edition of the Rocky Mountain News, the Rocky Mountain region's first newspaper, at Auraria.
  - May 6 — John H. Gregory discovers the first hard rock gold in the Rocky Mountains, a rich gold-bearing vein at Gregory Gulch, 28 miles (45 km) west of Denver City.
  - May 7 — The first stagecoach arrives in Denver City from Leavenworth, Kansas Territory.
  - June 16 — Golden City is established 13 miles (21 km) west of Denver City in northwestern Kansas Territory.
  - September 24 — Voters of the Pike's Peak Country reject the proposal to create a Provisional State of Jefferson.
  - October 24 — Voters of the Pike's Peak Country approve the establishment of the Provisional Government of the Territory of Jefferson by a vote of 1,852 to 280 and elect Robert Williamson Steele the first (and only) Governor of the Territory of Jefferson. The Jefferson Territory extended from the 102nd meridian west to the 110th meridian west and from the 37th parallel north to the 43rd parallel north, and encompassed all of the present U.S. state of Colorado and portions of Utah, Wyoming, Nebraska, and Kansas. (Note: The Constitution of the Provisional Government of the Territory of Jefferson states its boundaries as "Commencing at a point where the 37th degree of north latitude, crosses the 102nd degree of west longitude, and running north on said meridian to the 43d degree of north latitude; thence west on said parallel to the 110th degree of west longitude; thence south on said meridian to the 37th degree of north latitude; thence east on the said parallel to the place of beginning.") The Jefferson Territory served as the de facto government of the region until Governor Steele proclaimed the government disbanded on June 6, 1861.
  - November 7 — The first session of the Jefferson General Assembly convenes in Denver City.
  - November 28 — The Jefferson General Assembly creates 12 counties: Arrappahoe, Cheyenne, El Paso, Fountain, Heele, Jackson, Jefferson, Mountain, North, Park, St. Vrain, and Saratoga County.
  - December — Frederick Salomon opens the Rocky Mountain Brewery in Denver City, the first brewery in the Jefferson Territory.
  - December 3 — The Jefferson General Assembly grants a charter to the consolidated City of Denver, Auraria, and Highland, more commonly known as Denver City, as the territorial capital and seat of Arrappahoe County.

== 1860s ==
- 1860
  - January 1 — At the behest of the Jefferson General Assembly, Samuel Beall requests that the U.S. Congress approve the new Territory of Jefferson. Congress does not respond.
  - January 23 — The second session of the Jefferson General Assembly convenes in Denver City, the seat of Arrappahoe County.
  - February 1 — The Territory of New Mexico creates Mora County from parts of Taos County and San Miguel County. The new county extends into the southern portion of the Jefferson Territory and the future State of Colorado.
  - April 1 — The 1860 United States census enumerates the population of the Pike's Peak Country, later determined to be 34,277. Most of the miners in the backcountry prospecting for gold could not be counted, so there may have been a substantial undercount.
  - August 7 — A proclamation by Territorial Governor Steele proposes a merger of the Jefferson Territory with the Kansas Territory. Bleeding Kansas rejects the proposal outright.
  - November 6 — Abraham Lincoln is elected President of the United States. Seven slave states will secede from the United States of America before February 8, 1861.
  - November 13 — The Jefferson General Assembly moves from Denver City to Golden City, the new seat of Jefferson County.
- 1861
  - January 29 — U.S. President James Buchanan signs An Act for the Admission of Kansas into the Union, creating the free State of Kansas from the eastern portion of the Territory of Kansas. The western portion of the Kansas Territory becomes unorganized territory, although the Provisional Government of the Territory of Jefferson continues to act as the de facto government.
  - February 8 — Seven secessionist slave states create the Confederate States of America.
  - February 28 — U.S. President James Buchanan signs An Act to provide a temporary Government for the Territory of Colorado, creating the free Territory of Colorado. The new territory is created from the unorganized territory previously part of the Territory of Kansas, the northern portion of the Territory of New Mexico, the eastern portion of the Territory of Utah, and the southwestern portion of the Territory of Nebraska. The new name is chosen because the Colorado River is thought to originate somewhere in the Territory. The new territory is 41% smaller than the provisional Territory of Jefferson. The boundaries of the Colorado Territory are essentially the same as the present State of Colorado.
  - March 4 — Abraham Lincoln assumes office as the 16th President of the United States.
  - March 25 — U.S. President Abraham Lincoln appoints William Gilpin of Missouri to be the first Governor of the Territory of Colorado.
  - April 12 — The American Civil War begins with the Battle of Fort Sumter.
  - May 27 — Governor William Gilpin arrives in Denver City.
  - June 6 — Jefferson Territorial Governor Robert Williamson Steele proclaims the Territory of Jefferson officially disbanded after meeting with Colorado Territorial Governor William Gilpin.
  - September 9 — The first session of Colorado General Assembly convenes in Denver City. The legislature reenacts many of the laws of the Provisional Government of the Territory of Jefferson.
  - November 1 — The Colorado General Assembly creates 17 original counties: Arapahoe, Boulder, Clear Creek, Costilla, Douglas, El Paso, Fremont, Gilpin, Guadaloupe, Huerfano, Jefferson, Lake, Larimer, Park, Pueblo, Summit, and Weld County.
  - November 5 — The Colorado General Assembly votes to move the territorial capital from Denver City to Colorado City, the seat of El Paso County.
  - November 7 — The Colorado General Assembly reincorporates the City of Denver, Auraria, and Highland as the City of Denver (still commonly known as Denver City), the seat of Arapahoe County.
  - November 7 — The Colorado General Assembly renames Guadaloupe County as Conejos County after only six days.
- 1862
  - February 9 — Alferd Packer and five companions leave the camp of Ouray on the Uncompahgre River bound for the Cochetopa Hills.
  - March 10 — Texas cavalry under the command of Brigadier General Henry Hopkins Sibley occupy Santa Fe in the Confederate New Mexico Campaign.
  - March 26 — U.S. President Abraham Lincoln appoints John Evans of Illinois to be the second Governor of the Territory of Colorado.
  - March 28 — Colorado volunteers under the command of Colonel John P. Slough repulse Texas cavalry under the command of Lieutenant Colonel William Read Scurry at the Battle of Glorieta Pass. The battle effectively ends the Confederate New Mexico Campaign.
  - April 6 — Alferd Packer arrives at the Los Pinos Indian Agency in the Cochetopa Hills with no trace of his five companions. Upon questioning, Packer admits that he ate his companions.
  - May 20 — U.S. President Abraham Lincoln signs the Homestead Act of 1862.
  - July 11 — Unable to find adequate accommodations in Colorado City, the Colorado General Assembly votes to adjourn and reconvene in Denver City on July 16.
  - July 22 — The Union Army establishes Camp Collins near Colona.
  - July 7 — The second session of the Colorado General Assembly convenes in Colorado City.
  - August 14 — The Colorado General Assembly votes to move the territorial capital from Colorado City to Golden City, the seat of Jefferson County.
  - December 6 — The Black Hawk Point post office opens.
- 1863
  - January 2 — The Boonville post office opens.
- 1864
  - March 3 — Governor John Evans and the Reverend John Chivington found Colorado Seminary in Denver City. The seminary will close in 1868, but reopen in 1880 as the University of Denver.
  - May 19 — A flash flood on Cherry Creek sweeps away many low-lying structures of Denver City and separates many residents from their local saloons and brothels.
  - June 11 — In the Hungate massacre, Nathan Hungate, his wife, and his two daughters are murdered near Elizabeth in Elbert County, presumably by Native Americans. Public outrage following the killings leads to the Sand Creek Massacre in November.
  - October 22 — The Union Army moves Camp Collins downstream to the present site of Fort Collins.
  - November 29 — Colonel (and the Reverend) John Chivington orders the murder of hundreds of Cheyenne and Arapaho people in the Sand Creek Massacre.
- 1865
  - January 7 — The Battle of Julesburg, a skirmish between one thousand Cheyenne, Arapaho, and Lakota Indians and about sixty U.S. army soldiers along with forty to fifty civilians, takes place at Julesburg..
  - April 15 — U.S. Vice President Andrew Johnson assumes office as the 17th President of the United States upon the assassination of Abraham Lincoln.
  - May 9 — U.S. President Andrew Johnson proclaims the end of the American Civil War.
  - July 18 — U.S. President Andrew Johnson demands that John Evans resign as the Governor of the Territory of Colorado following an investigation of the Sand Creek Massacre.
  - August 1 — John Evans resigns as Governor of the Territory of Colorado. There will be no territorial governor until October 17, 1865.
  - September — The (White male) voters of the Territory defeat a referendum for universal male suffrage by a vote of 476 to 4,192, denying the vote to Indians, Negros, Asians, as well as women.
  - October 17 — U.S. President Andrew Johnson appoints Alexander Cummings of Pennsylvania to be the third Governor of the Territory of Colorado.
- 1866
  - February 9 — The Colorado General Assembly creates Las Animas County from a portion of Huerfano County.
  - February 13 — The City of Denver City shortens its name to the City of Denver.
  - March 6 — Brigadier General Kit Carson takes command of Fort Garland in the San Luis Valley in an effort to make peace with the Ute Nation.
  - December 29 — The Colorado General Assembly creates Saguache County from portions of Lake and Costilla counties.
- 1867
  - April 24 — U.S. President Andrew Johnson appoints Alexander Cameron Hunt to be the fourth Governor of the Territory of Colorado.
  - November 18 — The Union Pacific Railroad reaches Julesburg and eventually will have 9 miles (14 km) of mainline in the Colorado Territory.
  - December 9 — The Colorado General Assembly votes to move the territorial capital from Golden City to Denver, the seat of Arapahoe County.
- 1868
  - January 10 — The Territory of Colorado incorporates the Town of Georgetown. The Town of Georgetown is the only Colorado municipality still operating under its original charter from the Territory of Colorado.
  - May 23 — Brigadier General Kit Carson dies at new Fort Lyon at age 58.
  - July 9 — The Fourteenth Amendment to the United States Constitution is ratified.
  - August 23 — A party led by John Wesley Powell makes the first recorded (White) ascent of Longs Peak.
- 1869
  - Surveyor O.N. Chaffee determines the eastern boundary of the Colorado Territory beginning from Julesburg.
  - March 4 — Commanding General of the United States Army Ulysses S. Grant assumes office as the 18th President of the United States.
  - June 14 — U.S. President Ulysses S. Grant appoints Edward M. McCook to be the fifth Governor of the Territory of Colorado.
  - July 4 — Deer Trail hosts the world's first organized rodeo.
  - July 11 — The Battle of Summit Springs, an armed conflict between the United States Army and a group of Cheyenne Dog Soldiers, takes place in Washington County.
  - November 13 — The Denver Gas Company incorporates in Denver.
  - August 19 — S.F. Sharpless and William M. Davis make the first recorded ascent of Mount Harvard, highest of the Collegiate Peaks.
  - December 14 — Nathan Meeker, agricultural editor of the New York Tribune, appeals to readers of high moral character to help him build a utopian farming community between the Cache La Poudre River and the South Platte River in the Territory of Colorado. Meeker will name the community Greeley in honor of his publisher, Horace Greeley.

== 1870s ==
- 1870
  - February 11 — The Territory of Colorado creates Bent and Greenwood counties from expropriated Cheyenne and Arapaho tribal land and portions of Huerfano County.
  - April 1 — The 1870 United States census enumerates the population of the Territory of Colorado, later determined to be 39,864, an increase of 16% since the 1860 United States census. Colorado becomes the 3rd most populous of the nine U.S. territories.
  - May 2 — Episcopal Bishop George Maxwell Randall begins construction of the Territorial School of Mines at Golden City.
  - June 21 — The Denver Pacific Railroad reaches Denver from the Union Pacific mainline at Cheyenne, Wyoming Territory.
  - August 15 — The Kansas Pacific Railroad reaches Denver from Kansas City, Missouri, creating the first all-rail transcontinental route.
  - September 22 — The Colorado Central Railroad reaches Golden from Denver.
  - October 27 — The Denver and Rio Grande Railway incorporates in Denver. The company plans to build a narrow gauge railway from Denver south to Santa Fe, New Mexico Territory; El Paso, Texas; and on to Mexico City.
- 1871
  - January 2 — The City of Golden incorporates. Golden City is the former territorial capital and the seat of Jefferson County.
  - October 27 — The Denver and Rio Grande Railway is completed from Denver to the new town of Colorado Springs, bypassing Colorado City 5 mi (8.0 km) to the west.
  - November 4 — The City of Boulder incorporates. Boulder City is the seat of Boulder County.
- 1872
  - February 11 — The Territory of Colorado creates Platte County from the eastern portion of Weld County.
  - April 3 — The Town of Cañon City incorporates. Cañon City (also spelled Canyon City and Canon City) is the seat of Fremont County.
  - June 15 — The Denver and Rio Grande Railway reaches Pueblo.
  - October 2 — The Denver, South Park and Pacific Railroad incorporates in Denver to build a narrow gauge railway through South Park to the Gunnison River and the Utah Territory.
  - October 9 — The first Southern Colorado Agricultural and Industrial Exposition is held in Pueblo. The exposition will become the Colorado State Fair.
  - November 15 — The Town of Fairplay incorporates. Fairplay is the seat of Park County.
  - December 15 — The Colorado Central Railroad reaches Black Hawk.
- 1873
  - April 4 — U.S. President Ulysses S. Grant appoints Samuel Hitt Elbert to be the sixth Governor of the Territory of Colorado.
  - June 16 — The Town of Walsenburg incorporates. Walsenburg is the seat of Huerfano County.
  - September 17 — The Denver and Boulder Valley Railroad reaches Boulder.
  - December 2 — The Town of Alma incorporates.
- 1874
  - February 3 — |The Territory of Colorado creates Elbert County from a portion of Douglas County, and Grand County from a portion of Summit County.
  - February 6 — The Territory of Colorado abolishes Greenwood County and divides its territory between Elbert County and Bent County.
  - February 9 — The Territory of Colorado abolishes Platte County after organizers fail to secure voter approval. The territory of the county is returned to Weld County.
  - February 9 — The Territory of Colorado purchases the Territorial School of Mines in Golden from the Episcopal Church for $5,000.
  - February 10 — The Territory of Colorado creates Hinsdale, La Plata, and Rio Grande counties from portions of Conejos, Costilla, and Lake counties.
  - April 24 — Congress approves the Brunot Agreement removing the Ute people from the San Juan Mountains and opening the region to mining.
  - June 19 — U.S. President Ulysses S. Grant appoints Edward M. McCook a second time to be the seventh Governor of the Territory of Colorado.
  - July 6 — The Denver and Rio Grande Railway reaches Cañon City.
  - August 14 — Members of the Wheeler Survey make the first recorded ascent of Blanca Peak in the San Luis Valley.
- 1875
  - March 3 — U.S. President Ulysses S. Grant signs An Act to enable the people of Colorado to form a constitution and State government, and for the admission of the said State into the Union on an equal footing with the original States.
  - March 3 — U.S. President Ulysses S. Grant signs the Page Act limiting the immigration of Asians into the United States.
  - March 29 — U.S. President Ulysses S. Grant appoints John Long Routt to be the eighth (and last) Governor of the Territory of Colorado.
  - October 5 — Ulysses S. Grant becomes the first President of the United States to visit the Colorado Territory.
  - October 25 — The Colorado Constitutional Convention convenes in Denver to write a state constitution.
- 1876
  - January 31 — The Territory of Colorado creates San Juan County from a portion of Lake County.
  - February 29 — The Atchison, Topeka and Santa Fe Railroad reaches Pueblo.
  - March 14 — The Territory of Colorado establishes the University of Colorado at Boulder.
  - March 14 — The Colorado Constitutional Convention adopts the proposed Constitution of the State of Colorado
  - July 1 — Voters of the Territory of Colorado approve the proposed Constitution of the State of Colorado by a vote of 15,443 to 4,039.
  - July 4 — The Territory of Colorado celebrates the Centennial of the United States of America while still reeling from the defeat of Lieutenant Colonel George Armstrong Custer and the 7th Cavalry Regiment at the Battle of the Little Bighorn on June 26.
  - August 1 — U.S. President Ulysses S. Grant certifies that the conditions of the Colorado Enabling Act have been fulfilled and issues Proclamation 230 — Admission of Colorado into the Union. The Territory of Colorado becomes the State of Colorado, the 38th U.S. state.
  - October 3 — Voters of the new State of Colorado elect Territorial Governor John Long Routt as their first State Governor, Henry Moore Teller and Jerome Bunty Chaffee as their first U.S. Senators, and James Burns Belford as their first U.S. Representative.
  - November 1 — The Colorado General Assembly convenes for the first time.
- 1877
  - January 18 — The State of Colorado creates Ouray County from portions of Hinsdale and Lake counties.
  - January 29 — The State of Colorado creates Routt County from a portion of Grand County.
  - March 9 — The State of Colorado creates Custer County from a portion of Fremont County, and Gunnison County from a portion of Lake County.
  - August 13 — The Colorado Central Railroad reaches Georgetown.
  - September — David May, Jacob Holcombe, and Thomas Dean open a dry goods store in Leadville. The store will become the first component of The May Department Stores Company.
  - September 16 — The Solid Muldoon is uncovered on Muldoon Hill near Beulah.
- 1878
  - January 1 — David May opens The Great Western Auction House and Clothing Store in Leadville.
  - April 19 — The Royal Gorge War begins as a construction crew of the Atchison, Topeka and Santa Fe Railroad blocks a crew of the Denver and Rio Grande Railway from building into the Royal Gorge.
  - May 22 — The Colorado Central Railroad reaches Central City.
  - June 26 — The Denver and Rio Grande Railway reaches Alamosa.
  - August 12 — The Town of Alamosa incorporates.
  - December 7 — The Atchison, Topeka and Santa Fe Railroad reaches Raton Pass on the Santa Fe Trail, blocking the Denver and Rio Grande Railway's route to Santa Fe.
- 1879
  - January 14 — Frederick Walker Pitkin assumes office as the second Governor of the State of Colorado.
  - February 8 — The Colorado General Assembly renames Lake County as Carbonate County.
  - February 10 — The Colorado General Assembly abolishes Carbonate County after two days and splits its territory between a new Chaffee County and a renamed Lake County.
  - February 24 — The Denver Telephone Dispatch Company opens for business.
  - April 21 — The United States Supreme Court rules in the Royal Gorge War between the Denver and Rio Grande Railway and the Atchison, Topeka, and Santa Fe Railroad.
  - May 7 — The first passenger train passes through the Royal Gorge.
  - July — The Colorado Historical Society is founded in Denver.
  - September 1 — Colorado Agricultural College opens to students. The land-grant college is renamed Colorado State College of Agriculture and Mechanic Arts in 1935, and renamed Colorado State University in 1957.
  - November 8 — The Town of Buena Vista incorporates.

== 1880s ==
- 1880
  - March 3 — The Town of Breckenridge incorporates.
  - March 3 — The Denver, South Park and Pacific Railroad reaches Buena Vista.
  - March 27 — The Denver and Rio Grande Railway reaches a legal accommodation with the Atchison, Topeka and Santa Fe Railroad known as the Treaty of Boston.
  - April 1 — The 1880 United States census enumerates the population of the State of Colorado, later determined to be 194,327, an increase of 387% since the 1870 United States census. Colorado becomes the 35th most populous of the 38 U.S. states.
  - June 1 — The Denver and Rio Grande Railroad reaches the Colorado-New Mexico Territory border south of Antonito.
  - July 15 — The Town of Crested Butte incorporates.
  - July 22 — The Denver and Rio Grande Railroad reaches Leadville. The first passenger train to Leadville carries former President Ulysses Grant, the man who brought Colorado statehood.
  - December 3 — The Town of Frisco incorporates.
- 1881
  - January 13 — The Town of Bonanza City incorporates.
  - February 21 — The Colorado Electric Company incorporates in Denver.
  - February 23 — The State of Colorado creates Pitkin County from a portion of Gunnison County.
  - March 4 — The State of Colorado creates Dolores County from a portion of Ouray County.
  - April 1 — The Town of Aspen incorporates.
  - April 27 — The Town of Durango incorporates.
  - May 17 — The Town of Castle Rock incorporates.
  - June 1 — Denver Union Station opens.
  - July 27 — The Denver and Rio Grande Railroad reaches Durango.
  - August 8 — The Denver and Rio Grande Railroad reaches Gunnison.
  - August 26 — The Town of Crystal City incorporates.
  - November 8 — The City of Denver is made the permanent capital of the State of Colorado by a state referendum.
  - November 24 — The Denver and Rio Grande Railroad reaches Crested Butte.
- 1882
  - February 11 — The Town of Coal Creek incorporates.
  - April 12 — The Town of Empire incorporates.
  - April 13 — Oscar Wilde visits Leadville and later writes, "They afterwards took me to a dancing saloon where I saw the only rational method of art criticism I have ever come across. Over the piano was printed a notice : — PLEASE DO NOT SHOOT THE PIANIST. HE IS DOING HIS BEST."
  - April 18 — U.S. President Chester A. Arthur appoints Henry Moore Teller as U.S. Secretary of the Interior. Teller is the first Coloradan to serve in the Cabinet of the United States..
  - May 6 — U.S. President Chester A. Arthur signs the Chinese Exclusion Act banning Chinese immigration to the United States and denying citizenship to all persons of Chinese ancestry. Many Chinese miners leave Colorado mines.
  - May 7 — The Denver and New Orleans Railroad begins service between Denver and Pueblo.
  - June 26 — The Chicago, Burlington and Quincy Railroad reaches Denver.
  - July 8 — The Denver and Rio Grande Railroad reaches Silverton.
  - September 6 — The Denver, South Park and Pacific Railroad reaches Gunnison via the Alpine Tunnel under the Continental Divide of the Americas.
  - September 8 — The Denver and Rio Grande Railroad reaches Montrose.
  - October 24 — The Town of Delta incorporates.
  - November 7 — An earthquake estimated at 6.2 M_{fa} affects the Denver area with a maximum Mercalli intensity of VII (Very strong). The quake causes minor damage in Colorado and southern Wyoming and is the most intense in Colorado recorded history.
  - November 21 — The Denver and Rio Grande Railroad reaches Grand Junction.
  - December 19 — The Denver and Rio Grande Railroad reaches the Colorado-Utah Territory border west of Grand Junction.
- 1883
  - January 9 — James Benton Grant assumes office as the third Governor of the State of Colorado.
  - January 26 — The Town of Dillon incorporates.
  - February 10 — The State of Colorado creates Garfield County from a portion of Summit County.
  - February 11 — The State of Colorado creates Eagle County from a portion of Summit County, and Delta and Montrose counties from portions of Gunnison County.
  - February 12 — |The Town of Fort Collins incorporates. Fort Collins is the seat of Larimer County.
  - February 14 — |The State of Colorado creates Mesa County from a portion of Gunnison County.
  - February 27 — The Colorado General Assembly renames Ouray County as Uncompahgre County.
  - March 1 — U.S. Senator Horace Tabor of Colorado marries Elizabeth "Baby Doe" McCourt in Washington, D.C.
  - March 2 — The State of Colorado creates San Miguel County from a portion of San Juan County, and reverts the name of Uncompahgre County back to Ouray County.
- 1884
  - April — The Georgetown, Breckenridge and Leadville Railway reaches SilverPlume via the Georgetown Loop.
  - November 24 — The Town of Brush incorporates.
- 1885
  - January 13 — Benjamin Harrison Eaton assumes office as the fourth Governor of the State of Colorado.
  - April 14 — The State of Colorado creates Archuleta County from a portion of Conejos County.
  - November 15 — The Town of Erie incorporates.
  - November 15 — The Town of Evans incorporates.
  - November 15 — The Town of Greeley incorporates. Greeley is the seat of Weld County.
  - November 15 — The Town of Pueblo incorporates. Pueblo is the seat of Pueblo County.
  - November 15 — The Town of Silverton incorporates. Silverton is the seat of San Juan County.
- 1886
  - June 12 — The City of Central incorporates. Central City is the seat of Gilpin County.
  - June 19 — The Town of Colorado Springs incorporates. Colorado Springs is the seat of El Paso County.
  - July 12 — The City of Blackhawk incorporates.
- 1887
  - January 11 — Alva Adams assumes office as the fifth Governor of the State of Colorado.
  - February 9 — The State of Colorado creates Washington County from a portion of Weld County.
  - February 25 — The State of Colorado creates Logan County from a portion of Weld County.
  - June 15 — The Town of Fort Morgan incorporates.
  - September 1 — The Town of Brighton incorporates.
  - September 3 — The Colorado Midland Railroad begins service between Colorado City and Leadville via Buena Vista and Hagerman Tunnel under the Continental Divide of the Americas.
  - September 13 — The Town of Florence incorporates.
  - September 22 — The Town of Akron incorporates.
  - October 6 — The Denver and Rio Grande Railroad reaches Glenwood Springs via Glenwood Canyon.
  - October 28 — The Denver and Rio Grande Railroad reaches Aspen.
  - October 31 — The United States Army establishes Fort Logan southwest of Denver (transferred from the Army Air Service Command to the Veterans Administration in May 1946.)
  - November 5 — The Atchison, Topeka and Santa Fe Railroad reaches Denver.
  - November 8 — John Henry "Doc" Holliday, dentist, gambler, and gunfighter, dies of tuberculosis in Glenwood Springs at age 36.
- 1888
  - January 1 — The Missouri Pacific Railroad begins service between Pueblo, Kansas City, and Saint Louis.
  - January 12 — The Town of Burlington incorporates.
  - April 9 — The Denver, Texas and Fort Worth Railroad begins service between Denver and Fort Worth.
  - April 26 — The Town of Carbondale incorporates.
  - August 28 — The Town of Berthoud incorporates.
  - December 18 — Richard Wetherill and Charlie Mason find the Cliff Palace on Mesa Verde.
- 1889
  - January 8 — Job Adams Cooper assumes office as the sixth Governor of the State of Colorado.
  - February 19 — The State of Colorado creates Morgan County from a portion of Weld County.
  - March 15 — The State of Colorado creates Yuma County from a portion of Washington County.
  - March 25 — The State of Colorado creates Cheyenne County from portions of Elbert and Bent counties, Otero County from a portion of Bent County, and Rio Blanco County from a portion of Garfield County.
  - March 27 — The State of Colorado creates Phillips County from a portion of Logan County.
  - April 9 — The State of Colorado creates Sedgwick County from a portion of Logan County.
  - April 11 — The State of Colorado creates Kiowa, Kit Carson, Lincoln, and Prowers counties from portions of Bent and Elbert counties.
  - April 16 — The State of Colorado creates Baca County from a portion of Las Animas County, and Montezuma County from a portion of La Plata County.
  - June — The City of Denver establishes the Denver Public Library.
  - June 24 — The Denver and Rio Grande Railroad reaches Lake City.
  - December 29 — The Town of Antonito incorporates.

== 1890s ==
- 1890
  - January 15 — The Town of Fort Lupton incorporates.
  - January 18 — The Town of De Beque incorporates.
  - April 1 — The 1890 United States census enumerates the population of the State of Colorado, later determined to be 413,249, an increase of 112.66% since the 1880 United States census. Colorado becomes the 31st most populous of the 44 U.S. states and will gain a 2nd Congressional District.
  - May 14 — The Town of Cheyenne Wells incorporates.
  - July 4 — The Colorado State Capitol cornerstone is placed for the new building on Brown's Bluff in Denver.
  - October 9 — The Town of Elizabeth incorporates.
  - October 20 — Rancher Robert Miller Womack discovers a rich gold lode along Cripple Creek near Pikes Peak. The Cripple Creek Mining District will produce more than 730 tonnes of gold, the most of any Rocky Mountain district.
  - October 22 — The Manitou and Pike's Peak Railway completes the rack and pinion line to the 14,115-foot (4,302 m)?summit of Pikes Peak.
- 1891
  - January 13 — John Long Routt assumes office as the seventh Governor of the State of Colorado.
  - March 3 — U.S. President Benjamin Harrison signs An act to repeal timber-culture laws, and for other purposes, also known as the Forest Reserve Act of 1891, giving the President of the United States the authority to create protected national forests on federal lands.
  - July 1 — The Broadmoor Casino opens near Colorado Springs.
  - October 16 — The Denver and Rio Grande Railroad reaches Creede.
  - October 16 — U.S. President Benjamin Harrison issues a proclamation creating the White River Plateau Timber Land Reserve, the second United States National Forest.
- 1892
  - — Henry Perky of Denver develops a machine for making "little whole wheat mattresses", later called shredded wheat.
  - February 11 — U.S. President Benjamin Harrison issues a proclamation creating the Pikes Peak Timber Land Reserve.
  - May 19 — The Town of Creede incorporates.
  - June 9 — The Town of Cripple Creek incorporates.
  - June 23 — U.S. President Benjamin Harrison issues a proclamation creating the Plum Creek Timber Land Reserve.
  - August — Political supporters of Grover Cleveland found the Evening Post in Denver with $50,000.
  - December 5 — The Town of Eaton incorporates.
  - December 9 — U.S. President Benjamin Harrison issues a proclamation creating the South Platte Forest Reserve.
  - December 24 — U.S. President Benjamin Harrison issues a proclamation creating the Battlement Mesa Forest Reserve.
- 1893
  - January 10 — Davis Hanson Waite assumes office as the eighth Governor of the State of Colorado.
  - March 27 — The State of Colorado creates Mineral County from portions of Hinsdale, Rio Grande, and Saguache counties.
  - July 22 — Katharine Lee Bates visits the summit of Pikes Peak and writes the poem America the Beautiful.
  - November 1 — U.S. President Grover Cleveland signs the Repeal of the Sherman Silver Purchase Act (enacted July 14, 1890), but the repeal fails to halt the Panic of 1893 and plunges Colorado into a massive economic depression.
  - November 7 — Colorado becomes the second U.S. state to grant women suffrage and the first state where the men voted to give women the right to vote.
- 1894
  - January 10 — The Town of Aguilar incorporates.
  - February 7 — The City of Denver annexes the Town of South Denver.
  - March 14 — The Denver City Police and Arapahoe County Deputy Sheriffs barricade Denver City Hall to prevent the Colorado State Infantry from seizing the building in the City Hall War of 1894.
  - March 18 — Denver Union Station is extensively damaged by fire.
  - April 18 — The Town of Fruita incorporates.
  - July 1 — The Florence and Cripple Creek Railroad reaches Cripple Creek.
- 1895
  - January 8 — Albert McIntire assumes office as the ninth Governor of the State of Colorado.
  - February 20 — The City of Denver annexes the Town of Harman.
  - October 28 — Harry Heye Tammen and Frederick Gilmer Bonfils purchase the Evening Post of Denver for $12,500 (renamed Denver Evening Post November 3, The Denver Post January 1, 1901).
  - November 15 — The Town of Del Norte incorporates.
- 1896
  - July 24 — The City of Denver annexes the Town of Highlands.
  - September 6 — The City of Denver annexes the Town of Barnum.
  - November 7 — The Denver Zoo opens.
- 1897
  - January 12 — Alva Adams assumes office again as the tenth Governor of the State of Colorado.
  - June 23 — The City of Denver annexes the Town of Colfax.
- 1898
  - April 19 — U.S. Senator Henry M. Teller of Colorado offers the Teller Amendment to a Joint Resolution of Congress to ensure that the United States will not establish permanent control over Cuba after any conflict with Spain.
  - April 23 — The Kingdom of Spain declares war on the United States of America. The United States declares war on Spain two days later.
  - August 12 — The United States of America and the Kingdom of Spain sign a Protocol of Peace.
  - December 10 — The United States of America and the Kingdom of Spain sign the Treaty of Paris of 1898 to end the Spanish–American War.
- 1899
  - January 10 — Charles Spalding Thomas assumes office as the eleventh Governor of the State of Colorado.
  - March 23 — The State of Colorado creates Teller County from portions of El Paso and Fremont counties.
  - June 1 — Nikola Tesla begins research on the wireless transmission of power at his new laboratory in Colorado Springs.

== 1900s ==
- 1900
  - April 1 — The 1900 United States census enumerates the population of the State of Colorado, later determined to be 539,700, an increase of 30.60% since the 1890 United States census. Colorado becomes the 31st most populous of the 45 U.S. states and will gain a 3rd Congressional seat.
  - July 19 — The Town of Dolores incorporates.
  - August 25 — The Town of Fowler incorporates.
  - December 6 — The Colorado Museum of Natural History in Breckenridge is incorporated.
- 1901
  - January 8 — James Bradley Orman assumes office as the twelfth Governor of the State of Colorado.
  - August 26 — The Town of Basalt incorporates.
- 1902
  - January 24 — The Town of Crestone incorporates.
  - April 11 — U.S. President Theodore Roosevelt issues a proclamation creating the San Isabel Forest Reserve.
  - June 28 — U.S. President Theodore Roosevelt issues a proclamation creating the White River Forest Reserve.
  - July 18 — The Denver, Northwestern and Pacific Railway incorporates in Denver to construct a direct rail line to Salt Lake City via a tunnel under the Continental Divide.
  - November 10 — The Town of Cortez incorporates.
  - November 15 — After a prolonged court battle, the State of Colorado splits Arapahoe County into three new counties: the City and County of Denver, South Arapahoe County, and Adams County.
  - December 1 — The City and County of Denver begins operation and officially annexes the enclosed towns of Argo, Berkeley, Elyria, Globeville, Montclair, and Valverde.
- 1903
  - January 13 — James Hamilton Peabody assumes office as the thirteenth Governor of the State of Colorado.
  - April 11 — The State of Colorado changes the name of South Arapahoe County back to Arapahoe County.
  - April 23 — The Town of Fountain incorporates.
  - May 5 — The Town of Fletcher incorporates. Changes name to the Town of Aurora on March 4, 1907.
  - May 9 — The Town of Englewood incorporates.
- 1904
  - April 11 — The Town of Bergdorf incorporates.
  - June 1 — Robert W. Speer assumes office as the Mayor of the City and County of Denver.
  - August 24 — The Town of Arvada incorporates.
  - November 5 — The Town of Edgewater incorporates.
- 1905
  - January 10 — Alva Adams assumes office again as the fourteenth Governor of the State of Colorado.
  - January 19 — The armored cruiser USS Colorado (ACR-7) is commissioned at Philadelphia.
  - March 17 — March 17 becomes Colorado's day with three governors as Alva Adams, James Hamilton Peabody, and Jesse Fuller McDonald sequentially serve as the Governor of the State of Colorado.
  - April 5 — The Town of Eagle incorporates.
  - May 9 — The first water flows over the spillway of the new Cheesman Dam on the South Platte River in Jefferson and Douglas counties. The dam is the world's tallest at 221 feet (67.3 m).
  - May 12 — U.S. President Theodore Roosevelt issues proclamations creating the Gunnison Forest Reserve, the Leadville Forest Reserve, and the Pikes Peak Forest Reserve.
  - June 3 — U.S. President Theodore Roosevelt issues a proclamation creating the San Juan Forest Reserve.
  - June 12 — U.S. President Theodore Roosevelt issues proclamations creating the Park Range Forest Reserve and the Wet Mountains Forest Reserve.
  - June 13 — U.S. President Theodore Roosevelt issues proclamations creating the Cochetopa Forest Reserve and the Montezuma Forest Reserve.
  - June 14 — U.S. President Theodore Roosevelt issues a proclamation creating the Uncompahgre Forest Reserve.
  - July 27 — The Town of Genoa incorporates.
  - August 25 — U.S. President Theodore Roosevelt issues a proclamation creating the Holy Cross Forest Reserve.
- 1906
  - January 25 — U.S. President Theodore Roosevelt issues a proclamation creating the La Sal Forest Reserve.
  - January 29 — The first Western Livestock Show opens in Denver. The show will become the National Western Stock Show, Rodeo and Horse Show.
  - February 24 — U.S. President Theodore Roosevelt issues a proclamation creating the Fruita Forest Reserve.
  - June 8 — U.S. President Theodore Roosevelt signs An Act For the preservation of American antiquities, also known as the Antiquities Act of 1906, giving the President of the United States the authority to create national monuments on federal lands to protect significant natural, cultural, or scientific features.
  - June 29 — U.S. President Theodore Roosevelt signs An Act Creating the Mesa Verde National Park.
  - August 1 — The Argentine Central Railway reaches the 13,587-foot (4141 m) summit of Mount McClellan.
  - August 18 — The Town of Bayfield incorporates.
- 1907
  - January 8 — Henry Augustus Buchtel assumes office as the seventeenth Governor of the State of Colorado.
  - January 18 — The Town of Center incorporates.
  - February 2 — U.S. President Theodore Roosevelt issues a proclamation creating the Ouray Forest Reserve.
  - March 1 — U.S. President Theodore Roosevelt issues a proclamation creating the Las Animas Forest Reserve.
  - March 4 — The Town of Fletcher changes its name to the Town of Aurora.
  - May 2 — The Town of Cedaredge incorporates.
- 1908
  - June 25 — U.S. President Theodore Roosevelt issues executive orders creating Routt National Forest and Hayden National Forest.
  - July 1 — The Colorado Museum of Natural History opens its new building in Denver City Park.
  - July 1 — U.S. President Theodore Roosevelt issues executive orders creating Rio Grande National Forest, Pike National Forest, Cochetopa National Forest, Arapaho National Forest, and Battlement National Forest.
  - July 10 — The Democratic National Convention meeting in Denver nominates William Jennings Bryan for President of the United States
  - July 15 — The Town of Craig incorporates.
  - July 22 — The Town of Collbran incorporates.
  - September 9 — The Town of Frederick incorporates.
  - September 23 — The Town of Dacono incorporates.
  - October 8 — The Town of Firestone incorporates.
  - December 7 — U.S. President Theodore Roosevelt issues a proclamation creating Wheeler National Monument, the first Colorado National Monument. (Abolished August 3, 1950.)
- 1909
  - January 12 — John F. Shafroth assumes office as the eighteenth Governor of the State of Colorado.
  - January 19 — The Denver, Northwestern and Pacific Railway reaches Steamboat Springs.
  - March 4 — Edward T. Taylor takes his seat in the United States House of Representatives. Congressman Taylor will represent Colorado in the U.S. House for more than 32 years.
  - May 5 — The State of Colorado creates Jackson County from the western portion of Larimer County.
  - March 16 — U.S. President William Howard Taft issues executive orders creating La Sal National Forest.
  - April 26 — U.S. President William Howard Taft issues executive orders creating Sopris National Forest.
  - July 17 — The Shoshone Hydroelectric Generating Station begins transmitting electricity from Glenwood Canyon to the Denver area over the Shoshone Transmission Line.

== 1910s ==
- 1910
  - February 15 — The Denver Public Library dedicates its new library building.
  - April 1 — The 1910 United States census enumerates the population of the State of Colorado, later determined to be 799,024, an increase of 48.05% since the 1900 United States census. Colorado becomes the 32nd most populous of the 46 U.S. states and will gain a 4th Congressional seat.
  - May 18 — The Town of Blanca incorporates.
  - July 1 — U.S. President William Howard Taft signs an executive order creating Colorado National Forest (renamed Roosevelt National Forest on March 28, 1932.)
  - December 19 — The Town of Crawford incorporates.
- 1911
  - February 27 — The State of Colorado creates Moffat County from a portion of Routt County.
  - May 10 — Scottish operatic soprano Mary Garden sings in concert at the Park of the Red Rocks near Morrison.
  - May 24 — U.S. President William Howard Taft issues a proclamation creating Colorado National Monument.
  - May 29 — The State of Colorado creates Crowley County from a portion of Otero County.
  - June 29 — U.S. President William Howard Taft issues a proclamation creating Durango National Forest.
  - July 17 — The Mountain States Telephone and Telegraph Company is formed in Denver.
  - November — The Daniels & Fisher Tower opens in Denver.
- 1912
  - March 18 — The Town of Gilcrest incorporates.
  - April 15 — The RMS Titanic strikes an iceberg and sinks. Margaret Brown of Denver is hailed as a heroine by survivors.
  - April 26 — The Colorado Mountain Club is founded in Denver.
- 1913
  - January 14 — Elias M. Ammons assumes office as the nineteenth Governor of the State of Colorado.
  - March 8 — The State of Colorado creates Alamosa County from portions of Costilla and Conejos counties.
  - December 1 — Denver's greatest snowfall ever begins. Denver receives a five-day accumulation of 45.7 inches (1161 mm), while Georgetown gets 86 inches (2184 mm).
- 1914
  - April 20 — The Ludlow Massacre by the Colorado National Guard kills striking coal miners, 2 women, and 11 children.
  - April 28-29 — The Battle of Walsenburg is fought between strikers and the Colorado National Guard as part of the violence stemming from the Ludlow Massacre and Colorado Coalfield War.
- 1915
  - January 12 — George Alfred Carlson assumes office as the twentieth Governor of the State of Colorado.
  - January 26 — U.S. President Woodrow Wilson signs An Act to establish the Rocky Mountain National Park in the State of Colorado, and for other purposes.
  - March 4 — Colorado creates its 3rd Congressional District and its 4th Congressional District to replace its two At-large Congressional seats. These two congressional districts remain to the present.
  - October 4 — U.S. President Woodrow Wilson issues a proclamation creating Dinosaur National Monument.
- 1916
  - January 1 — State prohibition law comes into effect.
  - January 29 — The Town of Eads incorporates.
  - July 1 — Lieutenant Dwight D. Eisenhower marries Mamie Doud in Denver.
  - August 25 — U.S. President Woodrow Wilson signs An Act To establish a National Park Service, and for other purposes.
  - November 2 — The Town of Flagler incorporates.
- 1917
  - January 9 — Julius Caldeen Gunter assumes office as the twenty-first Governor of the State of Colorado.
  - January 10 — William Frederick "Buffalo Bill" Cody dies in Denver at age 70.
  - April 6 — The United States declares war on the German Empire and enters the Great War.
  - April 17 — The Town of Cheraw incorporates.
  - April 17 — The Town of Estes Park incorporates.
  - May 5 — The Town of Fleming incorporates.
- 1918
  - Spring — Construction of Army Hospital 21 begins in Aurora (named Fitzsimons Army Hospital in 1920, Fitzsimons Army Medical Center in 1974, closed 1999.)
  - May 14 — Denver Mayor Robert W. Speer dies at home in Denver at age 62.
  - June 29 — The Broadmoor resort opens near Colorado Springs at the site of the Broadmoor Casino and adjacent to the c. 1900 Broadmoor Shooting Grounds.
  - August 29 — The Town of Arriba incorporates.
  - September 23 — The Town of Crook incorporates.
  - Autumn — The Denver Art Association becomes the Denver Art Museum.
  - November 11 — An armistice halts the Great War.
- 1919
  - June 10 — The Town of Calhan incorporates.
  - July 4 — Jack Dempsey of Manassa defeats Jess Willard in a bout at Toledo, Ohio for the World Heavyweight Boxing Championship.
  - October 2 — U.S. President Woodrow Wilson suffers a severe stroke after giving a speech in Pueblo. The stroke will leave the President incapacitated for the rest of his life.
  - December 19 — U.S. President Woodrow Wilson (guided by First Lady Ellen Axson Wilson) issues a proclamation creating Yucca House National Monument.

== 1920s ==
- 1920
  - February 3 — The Town of Deer Trail incorporates.
  - April 1 — The 1920 United States census enumerates the population of the State of Colorado, later determined to be 939,629, an increase of 17.60% since the 1910 United States census. Colorado becomes the 33rd most populous of the 48 U.S. states.
  - June 15 — The Town of Eckley incorporates.
  - July — The United States Army renames Army Hospital 21 in Aurora as Fitzsimons Army Hospital.
  - December 5 — Douglas Fairbanks becomes the first Coloradan to star in a major motion picture: silent film The Mark of Zorro.
- 1921
  - March 26 — The Town of Branson incorporates.
  - June 3 — Flash floods on the Arkansas River and Fountain Creek kill 1500 people and inflict over $20 million of damage around Pueblo.
  - July 25 — U.S. President Warren G. Harding signs House Joint Resolution 32 - To change the name of the Grand River in Colorado and Utah to the Colorado River, despite the objections of the congressional delegations of the states of Wyoming and Utah. The headwaters of the Colorado River are now officially in Rocky Mountain National Park. Grand River namesakes (e.g., Grand County, Grand Hogback, City of Grand Junction, Grand Lake, Town of Grand Lake, Grand Mesa, and Grand Valley) remain unchanged.
  - October 10 — The Town of Crowley incorporates.
- 1922
  - March 10 — Denver radio station 9ZAF receives a commercial license as KLZ (AM 560 kHz), the first commercial radio station in Colorado.
- 1923
  - January 9 — William Ellery Sweet assumes office as the twenty-third Governor of the State of Colorado.
  - March 2 — U.S. President Warren G. Harding issues a proclamation creating Hovenweep National Monument.
  - August 30 — The battleship USS Colorado (BB-45) is commissioned in New York Harbor.
- 1924
  - March 11 — U.S. President Calvin Coolidge issues an executive order creating Grand Mesa National Forest.
  - June 2 — U.S. President Calvin Coolidge signs An Act To authorize the Secretary of the Interior to issue certificates of citizenship to Indians, also known as the Indian Citizenship Act of 1924, finally granting full United States Citizenship to all Native Americans born in the United States.
- 1925
  - January 13 — Clarence Morley assumes office as the twenty-fourth Governor of the State of Colorado.
  - June — Adams State Normal School opens in Alamosa (named Adams State University in 2012).
- 1926
  - Spencer Penrose establishes his Cheyenne Mountain Zoo near the BRO^{A}DMOOR.
- 1927
  - January 11 — Billy Adams assumes office as the twenty-fifth Governor of the State of Colorado.
- 1928
  - February 26 — The 6.2 mile (10.0 km) long Moffat Tunnel under the Continental Divide of the Americas opens as the world's longest railway tunnel.
  - July 10 — The Town of Bethune incorporates.
- 1929
  - May 11 — U.S. President Herbert Hoover issues a proclamation creating Holy Cross National Monument. (Abolished August 3, 1950.)
  - October 17 — Denver Municipal Airport opens (renamed Stapleton Airfield in 1944, Stapleton International Airport in 1964).
  - November — The City of Cañon City completes the Royal Gorge Bridge over the Arkansas River.

== 1930s ==
- 1930
  - January 22 — The Town of Bennett incorporates.
  - April 1 — The 1930 United States census enumerates the population of the State of Colorado, later determined to be 1,035,791, an increase of 10.23% since the 1920 United States census. Colorado remains the 33rd most populous of the 48 U.S. states.
- 1932
  - March 17 — U.S. President Herbert Hoover issues a proclamation creating Great Sand Dunes National Monument.
  - March 28 — U.S. President Herbert Hoover issues an executive order creating Roosevelt National Forest.
- 1933
  - January 10 — Ed Johnson assumes office as the twenty-sixth Governor of the State of Colorado.
  - March 2 — U.S. President Herbert Hoover issues a proclamation creating Black Canyon of the Gunnison National Monument.
- 1934
  - May 17 — The Dotsero Cutoff of 38.1 miles (61.3 km) in Colorado reduces the Denver-Salt Lake City railroad route by 173 miles (278 km).
- 1935
  - March 7 — The body of Elizabeth "Baby Doe" Tabor is found frozen to death in her cabin near the Matchless Mine in Lake County.
- 1936
  - May 9 — Members of Civilian Conservation Corps (CCC) Company 1848 at Morrison Camp SP-13-C in Red Rocks Park cease work on all other projects in preparation for the construction of Red Rocks Amphitheatre.
  - September 14 — The Town of Garden City incorporates.
- 1937
  - January 1 — Lieutenant Governor Ray Herbert Talbot assumes office as the twenty-seventh Governor of Colorado upon the resignation of Governor Ed Johnson to serve in the United States Senate.
  - January 3 — Ed Johnson takes his seat in the United States Senate. He will serve as a U.S. Senator from Colorado for 18 years.
  - January 12 — Teller Ammons assumes office as the twenty-eighth Governor of the State of Colorado.
  - February 7 — A donated rope tow begins operation at Berthoud Pass, creating Colorado's first public tow-assisted alpine skiing. Unfortunately, two skiers are killed in an avalanche the same day.
  - July 22 — U.S. President Franklin D. Roosevelt signs An Act to create the Farmers' Home Corporation, to promote more secure occupancy of farms and farm homes, to correct the economic instability resulting from some present forms of farm tenancy, and for other purposes, also known as the Bankhead-Jones Farm Tenant Act.
  - September 6 — The Will Rogers Shrine of the Sun is dedicated along the 1925 Cheyenne Mountain Highway.
  - October 4 — Lowry Field construction begins with Works Progress Administration conversion of the Agnes Stipps Memorial Sanitorium for an Air Corps training base east of Denver (renamed Lowry AFB June 24, 1948.)
- 1938
  - July 14 — U.S. President Franklin D. Roosevelt signs an executive order greatly enlarging Dinosaur National Monument.
  - December 2 — U.S. President Franklin D. Roosevelt signs an executive order creating Colorado State Forest.
- 1939
  - January 10 — Ralph Carr assumes office as the twenty-ninth Governor of the State of Colorado.
  - June 15 — The Town of Dove Creek incorporates.

== 1940 ==
- 1940
  - April 1 — The 1940 United States census enumerates the population of the State of Colorado, later determined to be 1,123,296, an increase of 8.45% since the 1930 United States census. Colorado remains the 33rd most populous of the 48 U.S. states.
  - May 19 — The Town of Federal Heights incorporates.
- 1941
  - January 3 — Colorado's 2nd congressional district representative (William S. Hill) and Colorado's 3rd congressional district representative (John Chenoweth) are seated in the United States House of Representatives.
  - March — Denver Ordnance Plant construction begins after a 1940 land purchase and January 1941 contract with Remington Arms Company (cf. February 1942 construction of the Pueblo Ordnance Depot).
  - April 14 — The Town of East Cañon incorporates.
  - June 15 — Rotary International celebrates the Grand Opening of Red Rocks Amphitheatre with 10,000 in attendance during their annual convention. An "informal dedication" was held the week before.
  - December 8 — The United States declares war on the Empire of Japan and enters World War II.
  - December 11 — The United States declares war on the German Reich and the Italian Empire
- 1942
  - January 6 — The United States Army announces the selection of Colorado Springs as the site of a major Army base (designated Camp Carson a few weeks later, Fort Carson on August 27, 1954).
  - February 19 — U.S. President Franklin D. Roosevelt issues Executive Order 9066 to relocate alien enemies (Japanese Americans) to War Relocation (Internment) Camps.
  - February 29 — Governor Ralph Carr publicly opposes the President Roosevelt's Executive Order 9066 and offers to provide temporary refuge for Japanese Americans in Colorado.
  - April — Lowry Field Number 2 construction begins east of Aurora—cantonment construction begins May 5, 1942 (later designated Buckley Field, Buckley Air National Guard Base in 1960, Buckley AFB in 2000).
  - April — The United States Army begins construction of Camp Hale near Tennessee Pass.
  - April 28 — The United States Army opens the Army Air Base at the Colorado Springs Municipal Airport (the shared airfield is later designated Peterson Field).
  - June 30 — Rocky Mountain Arsenal construction begins near Denver for World War II chemical weapons.
  - August 27 — The Granada War Relocation Center (Camp Amache) opens for Japanese-American internees.
  - December 31 — The City and County of Denver annexes the Town of MountainView Park.
- 1945
  - January 12 — John Charles Vivian assumes office as the thirtieth Governor of the State of Colorado.
  - spring — The Colorado Springs Tent Camp was established between the east edge of Colorado Springs and Peterson Field. ("Ent Air Force Base" in 1949, "Ent Annex" in 1975).
  - May 8 — The war in Europe ends as the Greater German Empire formally surrenders.
  - July 19 — The Town of Cherry Hills Village incorporates.
  - July 19 — The battleship USS Colorado (BB-45) steams into Tokyo Bay for the invasion of Honshu.
  - September 2 — World War II ends as the Empire of Japan formally surrenders.
  - September 10 — Mike the Headless Chicken survives an assassination attempt but loses his head near Fruita.
- 1946
  - December 14 — The Ajax Mountain Ski Area opens at Aspen with the world's longest chairlift.
- 1947
  - January 14 — William Lee Knous assumes office as the thirty-first Governor of the State of Colorado.
  - December 9 — The Town of Artesia incorporates.
  - November — Lloyd J. King opens first location of the grocery chain King Soopers in Arvada, Colorado.
  - Denver FM radio station KLZ-FM begins commercial broadcasting at 106.7 MHz in the new U.S. FM broadcast band.
- 1948
  - March 15 — The Town of Cokedale incorporates.
  - August — Construction begins on the Valley Highway in Denver. The Valley Highway will be incorporated into Interstate Highway I-25.
- 1949
  - January 3 — Wayne N. Aspinall of Palisade takes his seat in the United States House of Representatives. Congressman Aspinall will represent Colorado's 4th congressional district for 24 years.
  - Construction begins on the Pueblo Freeway in Pueblo. The Pueblo Freeway will be incorporated into Interstate Highway I-25.

== 1950s ==
- 1950
  - February 13 — Aspen hosts the FIS Alpine World Ski Championships 1950 at Ajax Mountain Ski Resort, the first World Ski Championships held outside Europe.
  - March 6 — The Town of Campo incorporates.
  - April 1 — The 1950 United States census enumerates the population of the State of Colorado, later determined to be 1,325,089, an increase of 17.96% since the 1940 United States census. Colorado becomes the 34th most populous of the 48 U.S. states.
  - April 15 — Lieutenant Governor Walter Johnson assumes office as the thirty-second Governor of Colorado upon the resignation of Governor Bill Knous to serve as a federal judge.
  - August 3 — U.S. President Harry S. Truman signs An Act to abolish the Holy Cross National Monument, in the State of Colorado, and to provide for the administration of the lands contained therein as a part of the national forest within which such national monument is situated, and for other purposes. The monument reverts to White River National Forest, and will become a part of the Holy Cross Wilderness.
  - August 3 — U.S. President Harry S. Truman signs An Act to abolish the Wheeler National Monument, in the State of Colorado, and to provide for the administration of the lands contained therein as a part of the national forest within which such national monument is situated, and for other purposes. The monument becomes the Wheeler Geologic Area of Rio Grande National Forest, and will become a part of the La Garita Wilderness.
  - August 28 — U.S. President Harry S. Truman issues a Public Land Order creating Manti-La Sal National Forest.
- 1951
  - January 3 — Byron G. Rogers of Denver takes his seat in the United States House of Representatives. Congressman Rogers will represent Colorado's 1st congressional district for 20 years.
  - January 9 — Dan Thornton assumes office as the thirty-third Governor of the State of Colorado.
  - July 10 — Construction of the United States Atomic Energy Commission Rocky Flats Plant begins 15 miles (24 km) northwest of Denver.
  - August 1 — The United States Post Office issues the Colorado 75th anniversary of statehood 3-cent postage stamp at the Minturn Post Office to commemorate Colorado statehood of August 1, 1776.
- 1952
  - January 19 — The Denver-Boulder Turnpike opens to traffic.
  - May 19 — The Town of Glendale incorporates.
  - July 18 — Denver television station KFEL-TV (analog channel 2) begins the first television broadcasts in Colorado.
  - September 3 — The United States Fish and Wildlife Service establishes the Monte Vista National Wildlife Refuge.
  - December 18 — The Town of Commerce incorporates.
- 1953
  - spring — The Summer White House for U.S. President Dwight Eisenhower is established at Lowry Air Force Base through 1955.
  - June 15 — The Town of Fraser incorporates.
- 1954
  - June 24 — The United States Air Force selects an area north of Colorado Springs as the site for the United States Air Force Academy.
- 1955
  - January 3 — Gordon L. Allott takes his seat in the United States Senate. He will serve as a U.S. Senator from Colorado for 18 years.
  - January 11 — Ed Johnson assumes office again as the thirty-fourth Governor of the State of Colorado.
  - July 11 — The first class of 306 cadets of the United States Air Force Academy are sworn in at Lowry Air Force Base in Denver.
  - September 11 — Sharon Kay Ritchie is the first Miss Colorado crowned Miss America (cf. Marilyn Van Derbur in 1957, Rebecca Ann King in 1973).
  - September 24 — U.S. President Dwight Eisenhower suffers an acute myocardial infarction in Denver. The President is treated at Fitzsimons Army Hospital in Aurora for several weeks.
  - November 1 — United Air Lines Flight 629 explodes over Weld County killing all 44 passengers and crew members. A Denver man will be convicted on May 5, 1956, of planting a dynamite bomb in his mother's luggage in an effort to collect her life insurance.
  - November — Monument Valley Freeway construction begins in Colorado Springs (later incorporated as part of I-25).
- 1956
  - July 7 — The Douglas Moore opera The Ballad of Baby Doe premieres at the Central City Opera.
  - September 22 — The Town of Boone incorporates.
  - October 15 — The Denver Public Library dedicates the new central library at the Denver Civic Center
  - November 10 — Professor George Gamow (Георгий Антонович Гамов) of the University of Colorado is awarded the 1956 UNESCO Kalinga Prize.
- 1957
  - January 8 — Steve McNichols assumes office as the thirty-fifth Governor of the State of Colorado.
  - September 11 — A plutonium fire in Building 71 of the Atomic Energy Commission Rocky Flats Plant contaminates the plant and releases radioactive plutonium into the air near Denver.
  - October 18 — United States Secretary of Commerce Sinclair Weeks announces a 547-mile (880 km) western extension of Interstate 70 from Interstate 25 in Denver to Interstate 15 in Utah. The highway extension will require burrowing under the Continental Divide of the Americas.
- 1958
  - May 12 — Canada and the United States establish the North American Air Defense Command (NORAD) to be headquartered at Ent Air Force Base.
  - August — Construction of Interstate Highway I-80S begins in northeastern Colorado (designated I-76 on August 1, 1974)
  - August — The Town of Bow Mar incorporates.
  - December 10 — Edward Lawrie Tatum is the first Colorado native to win the Nobel Prize for his 1937 metabolism work at Stanford University with George Wells Beadle.
- 1959
  - January 22 — The Adolf Coors Company of Golden introduces the aluminum beer can.
  - September 1 — Lowry Missile Site Number 1 construction begins southeast of Denver for a Titan I launch complex--Martin Missile Test Site 1 construction at Waterton Canyon had begun in April (alert status ended on March 26, 1965).
  - June 3 — The first class of the United States Air Force Academy graduates.
  - July 2 — The Town of Columbine Valley incorporates.

== 1960s ==
- 1960
  - February 9 — Brewer Adolph Coors III is murdered in a foiled kidnap attempt near his home in Bear Creek Canyon west of Denver.
  - April 1 — The 1960 United States census enumerates the population of the State of Colorado, later determined to be 1,753,947, an increase of 32.36% since the 1950 United States census. Colorado becomes the 33rd most populous of the 50 U.S. states.
  - spring — Interstate 70 in Colorado construction begins near Idaho Springs.
  - June 3 — U.S. President Dwight D. Eisenhower signs An Act Authorizing the establishment of a national historic site at Bent's Old Fort, near La Junta, Colorado, creating Bent's Old Fort National Historic Site.
  - August 3 — Dave Rearick and Bob Kamps become the first climbers to surmount The Diamond on the east face of Longs Peak.
  - September 9 — The Denver Broncos defeat the Boston Patriots 13 to 10 in the very first American Football League game.
  - November 3 — The Meredith Willson musical The Unsinkable Molly Brown opens at the Winter Garden Theatre.
- 1961
  - June — The Town of Broomfield incorporates.
  - July 20 — Tunneling begins for the NORAD bunker (the plan for a Denver Sector bunker had been cancelled in 1959, and the SAC bunker near Cripple Creek planned for 1965 was cancelled in 1963.)
- 1962
  - April 16 — United States Deputy Attorney General Byron White is appointed the 83rd Associate Justice of the Supreme Court of the United States. White will serve on the court for 31 years.
  - April 24 — The first of a series of minor earthquakes emanating from a region below the United States Army Rocky Mountain Arsenal near Denver is recorded. The earthquakes are later tied to the injection of toxic fluids into a hazardous waste disposal well at the chemical weapons plant.
  - May 24 — Astronaut Scott Carpenter from Boulder becomes the fourth person to orbit the Earth.
  - November 15 — Three Atlas missile sites of Warren Air Force Base begin operation in Colorado (eventually 8 sites at Keoto, 5 at Padroni, 8 at Peetz, 8 at Stoneham, etc.)
- 1963
  - January 8 — John Love assumes office as the thirty-sixth Governor of the State of Colorado.
  - March 1 — Dr. Thomas Starzl performs the world's first liver transplant at the University of Colorado Hospital in Denver.
  - July 25 — The United States Fish and Wildlife Service establishes the Alamosa National Wildlife Refuge.
  - September — Eminent nuclear physicist Edward Condon joins the faculty of the University of Colorado.
  - December — Dillon Dam on the Blue River in Summit County is completed.
- 1964
  - Stapleton Airfield in Denver is renamed Stapleton International Airport.
  - May — Construction of Interstate Highway I-225 begins in Aurora.
  - June 11 — The musical film The Unsinkable Molly Brown premieres in Denver.
  - July 3 — The Robert Ward opera The Lady from Colorado premieres at the Central City Opera.
  - August 26 — The British band The Beatles perform at Red Rocks Amphitheatre near Morrison.
- 1965
  - February 6 — The National Park Service creates the Curecanti National Recreation Area.
  - March 26 — The last Titan I ICBM of the former Lowry Bombing and Gunnery Range was taken off alert status (all Titan 1s were in storage by April 18).
  - June 16 — A flash flood on the South Platte River kills 28 people and inflicts over $500 million in damage.
  - July 25 — The United States Fish and Wildlife Service establishes the Browns Park National Wildlife Refuge.
  - December 12 — Interstate Highway I-270 construction begins in Denver.
- 1966
  - January 1 — Air Force Systems Command turned the Cheyenne Mountain Combat Operations Center over to NORAD.
  - October 19 — Blue Mesa Dam on the Gunnison River in Gunnison County is completed.
- 1967
  - August 5 — The Denver Broncos defeat the Detroit Lions 13 to 7 to become the first American Football League team to defeat a National Football League team.
  - September 5 — The United States Fish and Wildlife Service establishes the Arapaho National Wildlife Refuge.
  - September 17 — The Denver-Boulder Turnpike becomes the first public toll road in the United States to pay for itself and becomes a freeway. The turnpike becomes a portion of the westward extension of federal highway route US-36 from Denver to Estes Park.
  - October 15 — The Denver Rockets defeat the Anaheim Amigos 110 to 105 in their first game in the new American Basketball Association.
- 1968
  - February 10 — Peggy Fleming wins the Olympic gold medal in Women's Figure Skating at the X Olympic Winter Games in Grenoble.
  - March 15 — Construction begins on the first bore of the Straight Creek Tunnel designed to route Interstate Highway I-70 under the Continental Divide.
  - December 2 — U.S. President Lyndon B. Johnson signs An Act to establish a national trails system, and for other purposes, creating the National Trails System.
  - December 13 — United States Secretary of Transportation Alan Boyd announces the selection of 1,472.5 miles (2369.8 km) of additional highway routes for the Interstate Highway System, including the 5.6-mile (9.0 km) extension of Interstate Highway I-80S from I-25 to I-70.
  - December 31 — Deputy Major William H. McNichols, Jr. assumes office as the 40th Mayor of the City and County of Denver replacing Tom Currigan.
- 1969
  - March 15 — Historian Thomas Riha (Tomáš Ondřej Karel Říha) mysteriously disappears in Boulder. No trace will be found.
  - May 11 — A plutonium fire in Building 776/777 of the Atomic Energy Commission Rocky Flats Plant contaminates the plant near Arvada in the most expensive U.S. industrial accident to date.
  - May 12 — The International Olympic Committee selects Denver to host the XII Olympic Winter Games in 1976.
  - May 27 — The United States Department of Agriculture creates Comanche National Grassland and Pawnee National Grassland.
  - June 24 — The City of Lakewood in eastern Jefferson County incorporates.
  - July 1 — The Colorado General Assembly creates the Regional Transportation District to promote public transportation in the Denver metropolitan area.
  - August 20 — The City of Wheat Ridge in eastern Jefferson County incorporates.
  - August 20 — U.S. President Richard Nixon signs An Act to provide for the establishment of the Florissant Fossil Beds National Monument in the State of Colorado.
  - September 10 — The United States Atomic Energy Commission detonates the first nuclear explosion in Colorado. Project Rulison used the underground blast, equivalent to 40,000 tonnes of TNT, to determine if nuclear explosions could be used to extract natural gas from shale gas deposits.
  - September 21 — The final 21-mile (34 km) segment of Interstate Highway I-25 south of Walsenburg opens to traffic, completing the entire 305.040-mile (490.914 km) length of I-25 in Colorado.
  - October — The John Denver debut album Rhymes & Reasons is released.
  - December 14 — The Denver Broncos defeat the Cincinnati Bengals 27 to 16 in their last game as an American Football League franchise. The Broncos finish the ten AFL seasons with a record of 39 wins, 97 losses, and 4 ties.

== 1970s ==
- 1970
  - April 1 — The 1970 United States census enumerates the population of the State of Colorado, later determined to be 2,207,259, an increase of 25.85% since the 1960 United States census. Colorado becomes the 30th most populous of the 50 U.S. states and will gain a 5th Congressional District.
  - April 13 — An oxygen tank exploded on the Apollo 13 space flight to the Moon. The three-man crew, including Command Module Pilot Jack Swigert of Denver, managed to fly safely back to Earth four days later.
  - September 20 — The Denver Broncos defeat the Buffalo Bills 25 to 10 in their first game as a National Football League franchise.
  - October 23 — The final segment of I-270 is opened, completing the 5.2-mile (8.4 km) Interstate Highway I-270.
- 1971
  - May 19 — The Denver Art Museum opens its Gio Ponti designed North Tower.
  - October 3 — The United States Department of Transportation opens the High Speed Ground Test Center east of Pueblo.
- 1972
  - September 10 — Frank Shorter of Boulder wins the Men's Marathon at the Games of the XX Olympiad in Munich.
  - November 7 — Colorado voters reject a $5 million bond issue to fund the 1976 Winter Olympics.
  - November 15 — Denver withdraws its offer to host the 1976 Winter Olympics, the first and only host city to reject an awarded Olympic Games.
- 1973
  - January 3 — Pat Schroeder of Denver takes her seat in the United States House of Representatives as Colorado's first woman delegate to the U.S. Congress. Congresswoman Schroeder will represent Colorado's 1st congressional district for 24 years.
  - March 8 — Governor John Love dedicates the first bore of the Eisenhower Tunnel taking Interstate 70 under the Continental Divide of the Americas, the highest point on the Interstate Highway System.
  - May 17 — The United States Atomic Energy Commission detonates three underground nuclear explosions in Colorado. Project Rio Blanco used the three nearly simultaneous blasts, each equivalent to 33,000 tonnes of TNT, to determine if nuclear explosions could be used to extract natural gas from sandstone deposits.
  - June 21 — The United States Supreme Court orders the complete desegregation of the Denver Public Schools in Keyes v. School District No. 1.
  - July 16 — Lieutenant Governor John Vanderhoof assumes office as the thirty-seventh Governor of the State of Colorado upon the resignation of Governor John Love to serve as Director of the United States Office of Energy Policy.
  - September 8 — Rebecca Ann King of Denver is crowned Miss America.
  - December 9 — The Denver Broncos defeat the San Diego Chargers 42 to 28 to assure their first winning season in their 14th year of play.
- 1974
  - March — Reprise Records releases the Bob Seger album Seven including the song "Get out of Denver".
  - April — The City of Cañon City annexes the Town of East Cañon.
  - Chogyam Trungpa establishes the Naropa Institute in Boulder.
  - The United States Army renames Fitzsimons Army Hospital in Aurora as Fitzsimons Army Medical Center.
  - August 1 — Interstate highway I-80S is redesignated I-76. Over 500 route markers will be replaced in Colorado over the next two years.
  - October 16 — The Denver Nuggets lose to the Kentucky Colonels 117 to 99 in their first game since the team name was changed from the Denver Rockets.
  - December 21 — The first Telluride Film Festival begins.
- 1975
  - January 14 — Dick Lamm assumes office as the thirty-eighth Governor of the State of Colorado.
  - April 1 — Ent Air Force Base is downgraded to the Ent Annex of the Cheyenne Mountain Air Force Station.
  - August 18 — Construction of the second bore of the Eisenhower Tunnel begins.
- 1976
  - February 23 — The United States Postal Service issues the 50 American Bicentennial State Flag postage stamps. The Colorado state flag 13-cent postage stamp features the Colorado state flag.
  - March 1 — The United States Air Force renames Peterson Field in Colorado Springs as Peterson Air Force Base.
  - May 13 — The New York Nets defeat the Denver Nuggets 112 to 106 in the last American Basketball Association game ever played. The Denver Rockets/Nuggets finish their nine seasons in the ABA with a record of 474 wins and 432 losses.
  - May 21 — The final segment of I-225 is opened in Denver, completing the entire 11.959-mile (19.246 km) length of Interstate Highway I-225.
  - July 4 — The State of Colorado celebrates the Bicentennial of the United States of America.
  - July 31 — A flash flood in Big Thompson Canyon kills 143 people just hours before the Colorado State Centennial.
  - August 1 — A somber State of Colorado observes its statehood centennial as it assesses the damage from the Big Thompson Flood the previous evening.
  - October 1 — Ent Air Force Base closes in Colorado Springs.
  - October 5 — The Colorado Rockies defeat the Toronto Maple Leafs 4 to 2 in their first National Hockey League game since relocation.
  - October 22 — The Denver Nuggets defeat the Indiana Pacers 123 to 110 in their first game as a National Basketball Association franchise.
- 1977
  - May 21 — The United States Postal Service issues the Colorado statehood centennial postage stamp at the Denver Post Office eight months after the Colorado statehood centennial on August 1, 1976.
  - June — The United States Olympic Training Center the Ent Air Force Base in Colorado Springs opens to athletes.
  - July 5 — The United States Department of Energy opens the Solar Energy Research Institute (SERI) in Golden.
  - July 28 — Governor Dick Lamm requests that the proposed 26.3-mile (42.3 km) Colorado Interstate Highway I-470 be withdrawn from the Interstate Highway System.
  - September 30 — Proposed Colorado Interstate Highway I-470 is withdrawn from the Interstate Highway System.
- 1978
  - January 1 — The Denver Broncos defeat the Oakland Raiders 20 to 17 to win their first American Football Conference Championship.
  - January 15 — The Dallas Cowboys defeat the Denver Broncos 20 to 17 in Super Bowl XII.
  - February 26 — Boettcher Concert Hall of the Denver Center for the Performing Arts opens in the Denver Performing Arts Complex.
  - U.S. Highway 36 is extended westward along State Highway 66 from Estes Park to Deer Ridge Junction in Rocky Mountain National Park.
  - August 1 — The United States Olympic Committee moves into its new headquarters at the United States Olympic Training Center in Colorado Springs.
  - August — The Town of Avon incorporates.
  - September 14 — The comedy television series Mork & Mindy, set in Boulder, debuts.
  - October 9 — The United Nations Educational, Scientific and Cultural Organization (UNESCO) designates Mesa Verde National Park as one of the first 12 World Heritage Sites.
  - October 11 — U.S. President Jimmy Carter signs An Act to create the Indian Peaks Wilderness Area and the Arapaho National Recreation Area, to authorize the Secretary of the Interior to study the feasibility of revising the boundaries of the Rocky Mountain National Park, and to add certain lands to the Oregon Islands Wilderness, creating the Indian Peaks Wilderness Area and the Arapaho National Recreation Area.
  - November 10 — U.S. President Jimmy Carter signs the National Parks and Recreation Act of 1978 authorizing the Continental Divide National Scenic Trail, the Mormon Pioneer National Historic Trail, and the Oregon National Historic Trail.
- 1979
  - November 1 — Congressman Ken Kramer leaks the location selected for the Consolidated Space Operations Center east of Colorado Springs.
  - December 21 — Governor Dick Lamm dedicates the Edwin C. Johnson Bore of the Eisenhower–Johnson Memorial Tunnel completing the section of Interstate Highway 70 under the Continental Divide.
  - December 25 — Pope John Paul II grants the Cathedral of the Immaculate Conception in Denver the title Basilica minor.

== 1980s ==
- 1980
  - April 1 — The 1980 United States census enumerates the population of the State of Colorado, later determined to be 2,889,964, an increase of 30.93% since the 1970 United States census. Colorado becomes the 28th most populous of the 50 U.S. states and will gain a 6th Congressional District.
  - December 9 — Charlie Ergen, Jim DeFranco, and Cantey McAdams form EchoSphere in Littleton.
- 1981
  - January 12 — The television series Dynasty debuts. The series will become the longest running non-animated TV series set in Colorado (8 seasons, c.f. Dr. Quinn, Medicine Woman 6 sessions, Mork & Mindy 4 sessions).
  - October 1 — The annexation of the Broadmoor, Skyway, Ivywild, Cheyenne Canon, and Stratton Meadows neighborhoods by the City of Colorado Springs is upheld by the Colorado Supreme Court after a District Court voided the annexation.
- 1982
  - April 3 — The Colorado Rockies defeat the Calgary Flames 3 to 1 in their final National Hockey League game. In their six NHL seasons, the Rockies compiled a record of 113 wins, 283 losses, and 86 ties.
  - June 4 — The American Homebrewers Association sponsors the first Great American Beer Festival at its Fourth Annual Conference in Boulder.
  - October 4 — The 16th Street Mall in Denver opens.
  - December 28 — Congressman-elect and former astronaut Jack Swigert of Littleton dies in Washington, D.C. at age 51.
- 1983
  - May 17 — The United States Air Force begins construction of Falcon Air Force Station near Colorado Springs.
  - June 5 — The Irish band U2 performs at the Red Rocks Amphitheatre in a concert recorded as U2 Live at Red Rocks: Under a Blood Red Sky.
  - July 2 — Federico Peña is inaugurated as the first Hispanic and 41st Mayor of the City and County of Denver.
- 1984
  - January 1 — US West, Inc. of Denver is formed by the Bell System divestiture as a holding company with Mountain States Telephone and Telegraph (dba Mountain Bell), Northwestern Bell Telephone Company (dba Northwestern Bell), and Pacific Northwest Bell Telephone Company (dba Pacific Northwest Bell).
  - February 16 — Scott Hamilton wins the Olympic gold medal in Men's Figure Skating at the XIV Olympic Winter Games in Sarajevo.
  - June 18 — Alan Berg is murdered at his home in Denver by members of The Order.
  - July 22 — Marianne Martin of Boulder wins the first Tour de France féminin with a time of 29:39:02.
  - August 1 — A truck carrying six torpedoes for the United States Navy overturns and dumps its potentially explosive load into the intersection of I-25 and I-70 in Denver, the busiest intersection in Colorado known locally as the Mousetrap.
  - November — The Anschutz Corporation acquires Rio Grande Industries for $500 million. The new Rio Grande Holdings, Inc. includes the Denver and Rio Grande Western Railroad.
- 1985
  - September 26 — The United States Air Force opens the Consolidated Space Operations Center at Falcon Air Force Station near Colorado Springs.
- 1987
  - January 11 — The Denver Broncos defeat the Cleveland Browns 23 to 20 in overtime to win the American Football Conference Championship for the second time. The Drive becomes a part of American football lore.
  - January 25 — The New York Giants defeat the Denver Broncos 39 to 20 in Super Bowl XXI.
  - January 13 — Roy Romer assumes office as the thirty-ninth Governor of the State of Colorado.
  - April 5 — The National Mining Hall of Fame and Museum opens in Leadville.
  - May 8 — U.S. Senator Gary Hart announces the end of his presidential campaign which began the previous month.
  - May 8 — U.S. President Ronald Reagan signs An Act to amend the National Trails System Act to designate the Santa Fe Trail as a National Historic Trail, creating the Santa Fe National Historic Trail.
- 1988
  - January 17 — The Denver Broncos defeat the Cleveland Browns 38 to 33 to win the American Football Conference Championship for the third time.
  - January 31 — The Washington Redskins defeat the Denver Broncos 42 to 10 in Super Bowl XXII.
  - June 18 — The United States Air Force renames Falcon Air Force Station as Falcon Air Force Base.
  - October 13 — The Denver and Rio Grande Western Railroad becomes part of the Southern Pacific Railroad when Rio Grande Industries, Inc. acquires the Southern Pacific Transportation Company.
  - November 8 — Voters in Adams, Arapahoe, Boulder, Denver, Douglas, and Jefferson counties approved the creation of the Scientific and Cultural Facilities District.
- 1989
  - June 6 — The Federal Bureau of Investigation and the Environmental Protection Agency raid the Department of Energy Rocky Flats Plant near Arvada.
  - November 22 — The City and County of Denver holds a ground-breaking ceremony for a new airport to replace the aging Stapleton International Airport.
  - December 10 — Professor Thomas Cech of the University of Colorado Boulder and Sidney Altman receive the 1989 Nobel Prize in Chemistry.

== 1990s ==
- 1990
  - January 14 — The Denver Broncos defeat the Cleveland Browns 37 to 21 to win the American Football Conference Championship for the fourth time.
  - January 28 — The San Francisco 49ers defeat the Denver Broncos 55 to 10 in Super Bowl XXIV.
  - April 1 — The 1990 United States census enumerates the population of the State of Colorado, later determined to be 3,294,394, an increase of 13.99% since the 1980 United States census. Colorado becomes the 26th most populous of the 50 U.S. states.
  - June 23 — The Colorado Convention Center opens in Denver.
  - November 7 — The Colorado Fuel & Iron company in Pueblo files for Chapter 11 bankruptcy protection.
  - November 24 — The U.S. Environmental Protection Agency vetoes the Two Forks Dam Project proposed by the Denver Board of Water Commissioners.
  - November 26 — The United States Army transfers the Piñon Canyon Maneuver Site to Comanche National Grassland.
- 1991
  - January 1 — The University of Colorado Buffaloes football team defeat the University of Notre Dame Fighting Irish 10 to 9 to win the Orange Bowl and the Associated Press National Championship Trophy.
  - January 14 — An Idaho Springs man is killed by a mountain lion on a trail near his home.
  - June — The first segment of the E-470 toll road opens to traffic.
  - July 15 — Wellington Webb is inaugurated as the first African-American and 42nd Mayor of the City and County of Denver.
  - September 16 — U.S. President George H. W. Bush announces the promotion of the Solar Energy Research Institute to the National Renewable Energy Laboratory (NREL), a national laboratory of the United States Department of Energy.
  - October 15 — Giant Records releases the Warren Zevon album Mr. Bad Example including the song "Things to Do in Denver When You're Dead".
- 1992
  - May 26 — U.S. President George H. W. Bush signs an act of Congress creating the Two Ponds National Wildlife Refuge.
  - August 3 — U.S. President George H. W. Bush signs an Act to amend the National Trails System Act to designate the California National Historic Trail and Pony Express National Historic Trail as components of the National Trails System.
  - October 9 — U.S. President George H. W. Bush signs an act of Congress creating the Rocky Mountain Arsenal National Wildlife Refuge.
  - October 14 — Governor Roy Romer dedicates the segment of I-70 through Glenwood Canyon, completing the extended 449.589-mile (723.543 km) length of Interstate Highway I-70 through Colorado.
  - November 3 — Voters approve Colorado Amendment 1 to the state constitution, also known as the Colorado Taxpayer Bill of Rights (TABOR).
  - November 3 — Voters approve Colorado Amendment 2 to the state constitution which prohibits "special rights" based upon sexual orientation. Amendment 2 never takes effect due to legal challenges.
- 1993
  - July 13 — Steve Ells opens the first Chipotle Mexican Grill at 1644 East Evans Avenue in Denver.
  - April 5 — The Colorado Rockies lose their very first game to the New York Mets 3 to 0.
  - April 9 — The Colorado Rockies defeat the Montreal Expos 14 to 4 in their very first home game.
  - April — Construction begins to directly connect the intersection of I-270 and I-76 with the intersection of I-25 and US 36.
  - August 10 — A Fremont County man is killed by a black bear in his trailer.
  - August 10 — Pope John Paul II arrives in Denver to celebrate World Youth Day. This is the first visit to Colorado by a pope.
  - September 15 — The interchange of I-76 with I-25 is opened, completing the extended 188.10-mile (302.72 km) length of Interstate Highway I-76 in Colorado. This project completes the original design of the Interstate Highway System in Colorado, although improvements and enhancements will continue.
  - December 15 — Colorado district judge Jeffrey Bayless rules that Colorado Amendment 2 violates the United States Constitution.
- 1994
  - July 6 — A blowup of the South Canyon Fire kills 14 wildlands firefighters on Storm King Mountain, near Glenwood Springs.
  - October 7 — The Regional Transportation District begins light rail service in Denver.
  - December 10 — Rashaan Salaam of the University of Colorado Buffaloes football team wins the 1994 Heisman Trophy.
  - December 15 — The Town of Foxfield incorporates.
- 1995
  - March 25 — The Michael Graves designed addition to the central Denver Public Library opens.
  - April 26 — The Colorado Rockies defeat the New York Mets 11 to 9 in the first game played in the new Coors Field.
  - June 11 — Denver International Airport opens replacing Stapleton International Airport.
  - October 6 — The Colorado Avalanche defeat the Detroit Red Wings 3 to 2 in their first game since relocation.
  - December 28 — EchoStar Communications Corporation of Englewood successfully launches its first satellite, EchoStar I.
- 1996
  - April 13 — The Colorado Rapids lose to Sporting Kansas City 3 to 0 in their first Major League Soccer game.
  - May 20 — The United States Supreme Court rules in Romer v. Evans that Colorado Amendment 2 approved in 1992 violates the United States Constitution.
  - June 11 — The Colorado Avalanche defeat the Florida Panthers in four games to win their first Stanley Cup, becoming the first major league sports team to bring a championship trophy to Colorado.
  - July 22 — Amy Van Dyken of Englewood wins the first of her six Olympic gold medals in swimming at the Games of the XXVI Olympiad in Atlanta.
  - September 11 — The Southern Pacific Transportation Company merges with the UP Holding Company, Inc. to form the Union Pacific Corporation. The Southern Pacific Railroad becomes part of the Union Pacific Railroad.
  - December 26 — The body of JonBenét Ramsey is found in the basement of her home in Boulder.
- 1997
  - January 3 — Diana DeGette of Denver succeeds Congresswoman Pat Schroeder in the United States House of Representatives.
  - June 20 — The Group of Eight's 23rd annual meeting convenes in Denver.
  - July 17 — A Lakewood boy is killed by a mountain lion while hiking with his family in Rocky Mountain National Park.
  - August 1 — New Century Energies, Inc. of Denver is formed by the merger of Southwestern Public Service Company with the larger Public Service Company of Colorado.
  - August 13 — The animated television series South Park debuts. The series set in the fictional town of South Park, Colorado in the real mountain basin of South Park, will become the longest running TV series with a Colorado setting.
- 1998
  - January 11 — The Wild Card Denver Broncos defeat the Pittsburgh Steelers 24 to 21 to win the American Football Conference Championship for the fifth time.
  - January 25 — The Wild Card Denver Broncos defeat the world champion Green Bay Packers 31 to 24 in Super Bowl XXXII. Terrell Davis is named the Super Bowl Most Valuable Player.
  - June 5 — The United States Air Force renames Falcon Air Force Base as Schriever Air Force Base.
  - October 12 — Matthew Shepard dies at Poudre Valley Hospital in Fort Collins six days after a savage beating and robbery in Laramie, Wyoming.
- 1999
  - January 12 — Bill Owens assumes office as the 40th Governor of the State of Colorado.
  - January 17 — The Denver Broncos defeat the New York Jets 23 to 10 to become the first team to win the American Football Conference Championship six times.
  - January 31 — The Denver Broncos defeat the Atlanta Falcons 34 to 19 in Super Bowl XXXIII. Quarterback John Elway wins his second consecutive Super Bowl and his 148th NFL game, and is named the Super Bowl Most Valuable Player.
  - April 20 — The Columbine High School massacre begins when Eric Harris and Dylan Klebold open fire on the Columbine High School campus in Jefferson County killing 12 students and a teacher and wounding 24 others before killing themselves.
  - October 21 — U.S. President Bill Clinton signs An Act to redesignate the Black Canyon of the Gunnison National Monument as a national park and establish the Gunnison Gorge National Conservation Area, and for other purposes, creating Black Canyon of the Gunnison National Park and the Gunnison Gorge National Conservation Area.

== 2000s ==
- 2000
  - April 1 — The 2000 United States census enumerates the population of the State of Colorado, later determined to be 4,301,262, an increase of 30.56% since the 1990 United States census. Colorado becomes the 24th most populous of the 50 U.S. states and will gain a 7th Congressional District.
  - April 7 — The American Association of State Highway and Transportation Officials (AASHTO) approves the extension of the Interstate Highway I-270 designation from I-76 northwest to the intersection of I-25 and US 36.
  - May 9 — The Denver Museum of Natural History changes its name to the Denver Museum of Nature and Science.
  - June 9 — U.S. President Bill Clinton issues a proclamation creating Canyons of the Ancients National Monument.
  - June 30 — US West, Inc. of Denver merges into the smaller Qwest Communications International, Inc., also of Denver.
  - August 21 — Xcel Energy Inc. is formed by the merger of New Century Energies, Inc. of Denver into the smaller Northern States Power Company.
  - October 1 — The State of Colorado transfers Buckley Air National Guard Base back to the United States Air Force as Buckley Air Force Base.
  - October 24 — U.S. President Bill Clinton signs an act of Congress creating the Colorado Canyons National Conservation Area and the Black Ridge Canyons Wilderness.
- 2001
  - January 1 — Denver celebrates the arrival of the Third Millennium with fireworks above the 16th Street Mall after canceling last year's celebrations for safety concerns.
  - June 9 — The Colorado Avalanche defeat the New Jersey Devils in seven games to win their second Stanley Cup.
  - June — Construction on the T-REX Project in southeast metropolitan Denver begins.
  - November 15 — The Colorado General Assembly creates the City and County of Broomfield from portions of Boulder, Adams, Jefferson, and Weld counties.
  - December 10 — Professor Eric Allin Cornell of the University of Colorado Boulder, Carl Wieman, and Wolfgang Ketterle receive the 2001 Nobel Prize in Physics.
- 2002
  - April 22 — Linda Lovelace (née Linda Susan Boreman), former pornographic film actor and anti-pornography activist, dies in Denver following an automobile accident.
  - June 8 — A U.S. Forest Service technician ignites the Hayman Fire in the mountains of central Colorado. The wildfire will burn 133 homes, 467 outbuildings, and 137,760 acres (557 km^{2}) of forest, the most in Colorado recorded history.
  - June 9 — The Missionary Ridge Fire starts burning in the mountains north of Durango. The wildfire will kill one firefighter and burn 46 homes and 71,739 acres (290 km^{2}) of forest.
  - December 4 — U.S. President George W. Bush signs An Act to amend the National Trails System Act to designate the Old Spanish Trail as a National Historic Trail, creating the Old Spanish National Historic Trail.
- 2003
  - January 3 — The last segment of the E-470 toll road opens to traffic.
  - April 8 — The United States Fish and Wildlife Service establishes the Baca National Wildlife Refuge.
  - July 21 — John Hickenlooper is inaugurated as the 43rd Mayor of the City and County of Denver.
  - November 24 — The Northwest Parkway toll road from Broomfield to the intersection of I-25 and E-470 opens to traffic.
- 2004
  - June 4 — An irate citizen of Granby goes on a rampage with a self-built armored bulldozer destroying $7,000,000 worth of property before killing himself.
  - September 24 — U.S. President George W. Bush signs An Act to provide for the establishment of the Great Sand Dunes National Park and Preserve and the Baca National Wildlife Refuge in the State of Colorado, and for other purposes, creating Great Sand Dunes National Park and Preserve from Great Sand Dunes National Monument and creating the Baca National Wildlife Refuge.
  - November 2 — U.S. President George W. Bush defeats Colorado native John Kerry in the 2004 U.S. presidential election.
- 2005
  - January 1 — An Act of Congress changes the name of the Colorado Canyons National Conservation Area to the McInnis Canyons National Conservation Area.
  - June — The Lawrence Argent sculpture I See What You Mean, locally known as the Blue Bear, is erected outside the Colorado Convention Center in Denver. The sculpture will become a beloved symbol of Denver.
  - June 13 — The Cussler Museum opens in Arvada.
  - December 10 — Professor John L. Hall of the University of Colorado Boulder, Theodor W. Hänsch, and Roy J. Glauber receive the 2005 Nobel Prize in Physics.
- 2006
  - May 13 — The Colorado Mammoth defeat the Buffalo Bandits 16 to 9 to win their first National Lacrosse League Champion's Cup.
  - May 20 — The Denver Outlaws defeat the Chicago Machine 24 to 14 in their first Major League Lacrosse game.
  - June 13 — Sculptor Luis A. Jiménez, Jr. is killed in his Hondo, New Mexico studio assembling his Blue Mustang sculpture intended for Denver International Airport.
  - July 28 — The North American Aerospace Defense Command (NORAD) moves the operations of the Cheyenne Mountain Complex to Peterson Air Force Base.
  - October 7 — The Frederic C. Hamilton Building of the Denver Art Museum opens.
  - November 7 — Voters approve an amendment to the Constitution of the State of Colorado banning same-sex marriage.
  - November 17 — The T-REX Project in southeast metropolitan Denver is completed 22 months ahead of schedule.
- 2007
  - January 9 — Bill Ritter assumes office as the forty-first Governor of the State of Colorado.
  - April 7 — The Colorado Rapids defeat D.C. United 2 to 1 in their first game played in the new Dick's Sporting Goods Park.
  - April 27 — The United States National Park Service establishes the Sand Creek Massacre National Historic Site, commemorating the Sand Creek Massacre on November 29, 1864.
  - July 12 — The United States Fish and Wildlife Service establishes the Rocky Flats National Wildlife Refuge.
  - August — The Anschutz Medical Campus of the University of Colorado Denver opens.
  - October 15 — The Colorado Rockies defeat the Arizona Diamondbacks in four games to win their first National League Pennant.
  - October 28 — The Boston Red Sox defeat the Colorado Rockies in four games to win the 2007 World Series.
  - November 6 — The City of Castle Pines North incorporates.
- 2008
  - January 2 — EchoStar Communications Corporation of Englewood splits into EchoStar Corporation and Dish Network Corporation.
  - February 11 — The Luis A. Jiménez, Jr. sculpture Blue Mustang is unveiled at Denver International Airport. The sculpture will attain local notoriety as Blucifer as the cause of the death of its creator on June 13, 2006.
  - February 16 — The Bradford Washburn American Mountaineering Museum opens in Golden.
  - March 15 — Lindsey Vonn of Vail wins the International Ski Federation 2008 Women's Overall World Cup.
  - June 10 — Lightning ignites the Bridger Fire on the U.S. Army Piñon Canyon Maneuver Site. The fire will burn 46,612 acres (189 km^{2}) of forest and grassland.
  - August 4 — The extension of Interstate Highway I-270 from I-76 to the intersection of I-25 and US 36 opens to traffic, lengthening I-270 to 7.107 miles (11.438 km).
  - August 13 — Jack Weil, founder and CEO of Rockmount Ranch Wear, dies at his home in Denver at age 107.
  - August 28 — Barack Obama accepts the nomination of the Democratic National Convention in Denver for President of the United States.
- 2009
  - January 3 — Mark Udall of Eldorado Springs assumes office as the junior United States senator from Colorado.
  - January 21 — Michael Bennet of Denver assumes office as the junior United States senator from Colorado.
  - February 27 — The Rocky Mountain News, the region's oldest and second highest circulation newspaper, publishes its last edition just 55 days before of its sesquicentennial (c.f. April 23, 1859.) The Denver Post survives as the city's only major newspaper.
  - March 15 — Lindsey Vonn of Vail wins her second consecutive International Ski Federation Women's Overall World Cup.
  - August 7 — A Ouray woman is killed by a black bear at her home.
  - October 15 — The balloon boy hoax discombobulates emergency services in northeastern Colorado.

== 2010s ==
- 2010
  - February 17 — Lindsey Vonn of Vail wins the women's alpine skiing downhill gold medal at the XXI Olympic Winter Games at Whistler Blackcomb.
  - March 14 — Lindsey Vonn of Vail wins her third consecutive International Ski Federation Women's Overall World Cup.
  - April 1 — The 2010 United States census enumerates the population of the State of Colorado, later determined to be 5,029,196, an increase of 16.92% since the 2000 United States census. Colorado becomes the 22nd most populous of the 50 U.S. states.
  - September 6 — The Fourmile Canyon fire begins west of Boulder. The wildfire will destroy 169 homes.
  - October 14 — Workers uncover a trove of Pleistocene fossils at the Snowmastodon site while excavating a reservoir near Snowmass Village.
  - November 6 — The City of Castle Pines North votes to shorten its name to the City of Castle Pines. The City of Castle Pines is the youngest of the 272 active municipalities of the State of Colorado.
  - November 21 — The Colorado Rapids defeat FC Dallas 2 to 1 to win their first Major League Soccer Cup.
- 2011
  - January 11 — John Hickenlooper assumes office as the forty-second Governor of the State of Colorado.
  - January 12 — Deputy Major Bill Vidal assumes office as the 44th Mayor of the City and County of Denver replacing John Hickenlooper.
  - April 1 — CenturyLink, Inc. completes its $24 billion acquisition of the larger Qwest Communications International, Inc. of Denver.
  - July 18 — Michael Hancock is inaugurated as the 45th Mayor of the City and County of Denver.
  - September 23 — Occupy Denver begins a protest of the growing disparity of wealth and political power in the United States.
  - October 22 — Missy Franklin of Centennial sets her first swimming world record at the Fédération Internationale de Natation (FINA) Swimming World Cup in Berlin.
  - November 18 — The Clyfford Still Museum opens in Denver.
- 2012
  - March 16 — Lindsey Vonn of Vail wins her fourth International Ski Federation Women's Overall World Cup.
  - April 28 — The History Colorado Center opens in Denver.
  - June 9 — A lightning strike ignites the High Park Fire west of Fort Collins. The wildfire will kill one person and destroy 248 homes and 87,250 acres (353 km^{2}) of forest.
  - June 23 — The Waldo Canyon Fire ignites west of Colorado Springs. The wildfire will destroy 347 homes.
  - June 25 — Sparks ignite the Last Chance Fire on the prairie near Last Chance. This wildfire will burn four homes, seven outbuildings, and 44,000 acres (178 km^{2}) of grassland in a few hours.
  - July 20 — A gunman opens fire in a cinema in an Aurora, Colorado screening The Dark Knight Rises, killing 12 people and wounding 70 others.
  - July 30 — Missy Franklin of Centennial wins the first of four gold medals in swimming at the Games of the XXX Olympiad in London.
  - September 21 — U.S. President Barack Obama issues a proclamation creating Chimney Rock National Monument on 4,726 acres (19 km^{2}) of the San Juan National Forest.
  - September 28 — The History Colorado Center opens in Denver.
  - November 6 — Voters approve Colorado Amendment 64 legalizing possession of small quantities of cannabis.
  - December 10 — David J. Wineland of the National Institute of Standards and Technology and the University of Colorado Boulder and Serge Haroche receive the 2012 Nobel Prize in Physics.
- 2013
  - March 19 — Tom Clements, executive director of the Colorado Department of Corrections, is assassinated at his home in Monument.
  - March 20 — Governor John Hickenlooper signs three bills intended to curb firearm violence.
  - May 1 — An Act of the Colorado General Assembly makes civil unions legal in Colorado for both conventional and same-sex couples, although same-sex marriage remains illegal for 17 months.
  - June 5 — Lightning ignites the first of the West Fork Complex fires near Wolf Creek Pass. The wildfires will burn 109,049 acres (441 km^{2}) of forest.
  - June 11 — Lightning ignites the Big Meadows fire in Rocky Mountain National Park.
  - June 13 — The Black Forest fire north of Colorado Springs surpasses the Waldo Canyon fire as the most destructive in state history. A total of 486 homes will be destroyed by June 20.
  - July 18 — The Royal Gorge wildfire destroys buildings and the aerial tram at the Royal Gorge Bridge and Park after starting on June 11.
  - September 10 — A recall election removes State Senate President John Morse and State Senator Angela Giron from office.
  - September 12 — Floods along the Front Range Urban Corridor kill 9 people. More than 22,000 residents are evacuated including 1,000 by military helicopters. More than 30,000 homes are damaged and 1800 are destroyed. Total damages will exceed $2.9 billion.
- 2014
  - January 1 — Colorado becomes the first U.S. state to legalize cannabis for recreational use.
  - January 19 — The Denver Broncos defeat the New England Patriots 26 to 16 to win the American Football Conference Championship for the seventh time.
  - February 2 — The Denver Broncos lose Super Bowl XLVIII to the Seattle Seahawks 43 to 8 to become the first team to lose the Super Bowl five times.
  - February 21 — Mikaela Shiffrin of Vail wins the women's alpine skiing slalom gold medal at the XXII Olympic Winter Games in Sochi, Russia.
  - May 25 — A 40,000,000 cu yd (31,000,000 m^{3}) landslide breaks loose on Grand Mesa near Collbran, hits speeds of more than 50 mph (80 km/h), and kills three men.
  - July 26 — The Regional Transportation District reopens Denver Union Station marking the conclusion of a $56 million redevelopment into a regional multimodal transit hub.
  - August 23 — The Denver Outlaws defeat the Rochester Rattlers 12 to 11 to win their first Major League Lacrosse Steinfeld Cup.
  - October 6 — Immediately following a declination by the United States Supreme Court, Colorado Attorney General John Suthers declares that same-sex marriage will be legal in Colorado as soon as legal stays can be lifted.
- 2015
  - January 2 — Cory Gardner of Yuma assumes office as the junior United States senator from Colorado.
  - February 19 — U.S. President Barack Obama issues a proclamation creating Browns Canyon National Monument on 21,586 acres (87 km^{2}) of Bureau of Land Management land.
- 2016
  - January 24 — The Denver Broncos defeat the New England Patriots 20 to 18 to win the American Football Conference Championship for the eighth time.
  - February 7 — The Denver Broncos defeat the Carolina Panthers 24 to 10 to win Super Bowl 50. Von Miller is named the Super Bowl Most Valuable Player. Quarterback Peyton Manning wins his second Super Bowl and his 200th NFL game.
  - March 22 — The Regional Transportation District begins operation of its commuter rail A line between Denver Union Station and Denver International Airport.
  - June 19 — A child starts the Beaver Creek Fire near Walden. The wildfire will burn one home, 16 outbuildings, and 38,380 acres (155 km^{2}) of forest.
  - August 20 — The Denver Outlaws defeat the Ohio Machine 19 to 18 to win their second Major League Lacrosse Steinfeld Cup.
- 2017
  - March 18 — Mikaela Shiffrin of Eagle-Vail wins the International Ski Federation Women's Overall World Cup.
  - April 10 — United States Circuit Court Judge Neil Gorsuch of Boulder is sworn in as the 101st Associate Justice of the Supreme Court of the United States.
  - October 8 — Eleven-year-old Gitanjali Rao of Lone Tree wins the 2017 Discovery Education 3M Young Scientist Challenge for her invention of a device that can detect lead in water faster than existing techniques.
  - November 19 — Martin Truex Jr. of Denver wins the 2017 NASCAR Cup.
- 2018
  - February 11 — Red Gerard of Silverthorne wins the Men's Snowboarding Slopestyle Gold Medal at the XXIII Olympic Games in Pyeongchang, Korea.
  - February 15 — Mikaela Shiffrin of Eagle-Vail wins the Women's Alpine Skiing Giant Slalom Gold Medal at the XXIII Olympic Winter Games in Pyeongchang, Korea.
  - March 2 — The Colorado House of Representatives expels State Representative Steve Lebsock for inappropriate behavior.
  - March 17 — The attack submarine USS Colorado (SSN-788) is commissioned at the Naval Submarine Base New London.
  - March 18 — Mikaela Shiffrin of Eagle-Vail wins her second consecutive International Ski Federation Women's Overall World Cup.
  - April 17 — The Badger Hole Fire ignites near Walsh. The wildfire will burn 50,815 acres (206 km^{2}) of grassland with 33,609 acres (136 km^{2}) in Colorado and 17,206 acres (70 km^{2}) in Kansas.
  - April 17 — The Mile Marker 117 Fire ignites 17 miles (27 km) north of Pueblo. The wildfire will burn 42,795 acres (173 km^{2}) of grassland.
  - June 1 — An antique steam locomotive ignites the 416 Fire 10 miles (16 km) north of Durango. The wildfire will burn 54,129 acres (219 km^{2}) of forest over a period of six months.
  - June 7 — An illegal campfire ignites the Spring Creek Fire 9 miles (14 km) northeast of Fort Garland. The wildfire will burn 251 homes and 108,045 acres (437 km^{2}) of forest.
  - June 28 — Lightning ignites the Weston Pass Fire 9 miles (14 km) southwest of Fairplay. The wildfire will burn 13,023 acres (53 km^{2}) of forest.
  - August 18 — The Denver Outlaws defeat the Dallas Rattlers 16 to 12 to win their third Major League Lacrosse Steinfeld Cup.
  - November 6 — In the 2018 General Election, Democrats win all five Colorado statewide offices and control of the Colorado General Assembly. Republicans retain three of the state's seven Congressional seats.
- 2019
  - January 8 — Jared Polis of Boulder assumes office as the forty-third Governor of the State of Colorado.
  - March 4 — Former governor John Hickenlooper of Denver announces his candidacy for President of the United States.
  - March 13 — Winter Storm Ulmer undergoes explosive cyclogenesis as it rips across the Southern Rocky Mountains of Colorado. The bomb cyclone blizzard with hurricane-force winds sets all-time record low barometric pressure readings across the state.
  - March 17 — Mikaela Shiffrin of Eagle-Vail wins her third consecutive International Ski Federation Women's Overall World Cup.
  - April 26 — The Regional Transportation District begins operation of its commuter rail G line between Denver Union Station and Wheat Ridge.
  - May 2 — United States Senator Michael Bennet of Denver announces his candidacy for President of the United States.
  - May 7 — Two armed students attack STEM School Highlands Ranch killing one student and wounding eight others.
  - July 20 — An ambient air temperature of 115 °F (46.1 °C) at John Martin Dam sets the official Colorado all-time high temperature record.
  - August 15 — Former governor John Hickenlooper ends his campaign for President of the United States.
  - August 30 — Elijah McClain of Aurora dies six days after an unprovoked detention by Aurora police.
  - September 8 — Lightning ignites the Decker Fire in the Sangre de Cristo Wilderness. Up to 720 firefighters will battle the wildfire which will consume 8,959 acres (36 km^{2}) of forest.
  - October 25 — Reprise Records releases the Neil Young album Colorado.

== 2020s ==
- 2020
  - February 4 — A Fort Collins trail runner is attacked by a young mountain lion, but is able to strangle the animal.
  - February 11 — United States Senator Michael Bennet of Denver ends his campaign for President of the United States.
  - March 5 — A visitor to Summit County becomes the first person in Colorado to test positive for the COVID-19 virus.
  - March 10 — Colorado Governor Jared Polis declares a Colorado state of emergency in response to the COVID-19 pandemic.
  - March 13 — A woman in El Paso County becomes the first person in Colorado to die from the COVID-19 virus.
  - March 25 — Colorado Governor Jared Polis issues the first Colorado Stay-at-Home order effective at 6:00 a.m. the following morning.
  - March 28 — U.S. President Donald Trump declares that a major disaster exists in the State of Colorado as a result of the COVID-19 pandemic.
  - April 1 — The 2020 United States census enumerates the population of the State of Colorado, later determined to be 5,773,714, an increase of 14.80% since the 2010 United States census. Colorado becomes the 21st most populous of the 50 U.S. states and will gain an 8th Congressional District.
  - April 26 — Colorado Governor Jared Polis rescinds his statewide Stay-at-Home order while requiring continued COVID-19 precautions.
  - June 16 — Colorado Governor Jared Polis issues a statewide COVID-19 mask order.
  - June 24 — Colorado Governor Jared Polis announces a state investigation into the unprovoked death of Elijah McClain while in the custody of Aurora Police.
  - June 27 — Aurora Police in riot gear disperse thousands of protestors in the Violin Protest of the death of Elijah McClain.
  - July 31 — Lightning ignites the Pine Gulch Fire 18 miles (29 km) north of Grand Junction. As many as 466 firefighters battle the wildfire as it consumes 139,007 acres (563 km^{2}) of forest and rangeland to become the most extensive Colorado wildfire in recorded history, only to be surpassed by the Cameron Peak Fire seven weeks later.
  - August 10 — Humans ignite the Grizzly Creek Fire in Glenwood Canyon of the Colorado River. The wildfire closes Interstate 70, the Union Pacific Railroad, and the Amtrak California Zephyr for two weeks. As many as 889 firefighters battle the wildfire as it consumes 32,631 acres (132 km^{2}) of forest.
  - August 13 — The Cameron Peak Fire ignites 15 miles (24 km) southwest of Red Feather Lakes. As many as 1,903 firefighters battle the wildfire as it consumes 208,913 acres (845 km^{2}) of forest to become the most extensive Colorado wildfire in recorded history, surpassing the ongoing Pine Gulch Fire. Thousands evacuated, 209 homes destroyed.
  - August 14 — Humans ignite the Williams Fork Fire 9.5 miles (15.3 km) southwest of Fraser. As many as 396 firefighters battle the wildfire as it consumes 14,833 acres (60 km^{2}) of forest.
  - August 19 — Palantir Technologies relocates its headquarters from Palo Alto, California, to Denver.
  - September 6 — Lightning ignites the Middle Fork Fire 10 miles (16 km) north of Steamboat Springs. As many as 136 firefighters battle the wildfire as it consumes 20,517 acres (83 km^{2}) of forest.
  - September 17 — The Mullen Fire ignites 7 miles (11 km) west of Centennial, Wyoming. As many as 1,254 firefighters battle the wildfire as it spreads through Carbon County, Wyoming, Albany County, Wyoming, and Jackson County, Colorado and consumes 176,878 acres (716 km^{2}) of forest.
  - October 14 — The East Troublesome Fire ignites north of Parshall. As many as 794 firefighters battle the wildfire as it consumes 193,812 acres (784 km^{2}) of forest and rangeland to become the second most extensive Colorado wildfire in recorded history. Thousands evacuated, more than 300 homes destroyed, and two residents killed. The wildfire would become the most expensive in Colorado history with insured losses alone of $543 million.
  - October 17 — The Calwood Fire ignites 3 miles (5 km) northwest of Jamestown. As many as 495 firefighters battle the wildfire as it consumes 10,106 acres (41 km^{2}) of forest and 26 homes.
  - October 30 — Fishers Peak State Park opens to the public.
  - November 3 — In the 2020 General Election, Colorado voters elect nine U.S. Presidential Electors for Joe Biden, elect John Hickenlooper as a new U.S. Senator, elect Lauren Boebert as the new 3rd District U.S. Representative, and re-elect the other six incumbent U.S. Representatives. Democrats retain control of the Colorado General Assembly.
  - December 3 — TIME names 15-year-old Gitanjali Rao of Lone Tree its first ever "Kid of the Year".
  - December 10 — Elizabeth Ann, a female black-footed ferret, is born at the National Black-footed Ferret Conservation Center in Wellington. Elizabeth Ann becomes the first U.S. endangered species to be successfully cloned.
- 2021
  - March 14 — A blizzard dumps up to three feet (90 cm) of snow on the Front Range Urban Corridor.
  - March 22 — An Arvada man shoots ten people to death at a grocery store in Boulder.
  - March 30 — A Trimble woman is killed by a black bear with two yearling cubs on a trail near her home.
  - May 9 — A Colorado Springs man shoots six people to death at a family birthday party before taking his own life.
  - June 4 — The United States Space Force recommissions Buckley Air Force Base as Buckley Space Force Base.
  - June 8 — Nikola Jokić (Никола Јокић) of the Denver Nuggets wins the NBA MVP Award.
  - June 27 — The first of a series of summer mudslides precipitated by the 2020 Grizzly Creek Fire closes Interstate 70 through Glenwood Canyon.
  - July 26 — The United States Space Force recommissions Peterson Air Force Base, Schriever Air Force Base, and Cheyenne Mountain Air Force Station as Peterson Space Force Base, Schriever Space Force Base, and Cheyenne Mountain Space Force Station.
  - August 2 — Valarie Allman of Longmont wins the gold medal for the women's discus throw at the Games of the XXXII Olympiad in Tokyo.
  - September 17 — Meow Wolf Convergence Station opens in Denver.
  - October 20 — The United States Forest Service and Colorado Parks and Wildlife announce a first-of-its-kind agreement to create Sweetwater Lake State Park, Colorado's 43rd state park.
  - November 16 — The Kruger Rock Fire ignites near Estes Park. A fire retardant tanker plane crashes while battling the wildfire, killing its pilot.
  - December 10 — A mere 0.3 inch (0.8 cm) of snow falls on Denver, the latest first seasonal snowfall in recorded Denver history.
  - December 27 — A Denver gunman kills three Denver residents and two Lakewood residents before being killed by seriously wounded Lakewood Police Agent Ashley Ferris.
  - December 30 — Fanned by winds gusting over 110 miles per hour (180 km/h), the Marshall Fire burns 6,026 acres (24.39 km^{2}) in southeastern Boulder County in six hours and forces the evacuation of more than 30,000 residents. The wildfire kills two people and destroys 1,084 homes and seven businesses and damages another 149 homes and 40 businesses with total losses estimated to exceed US$2 billion, making it the most expensive natural disaster in state history.
- 2022
  - April 4 — Colorado Governor Jared Polis signs the Reproductive Health Equity Act which guarantees access to reproductive care and affirms the rights of pregnant people to continue or terminate a pregnancy.
  - May 11 — Nikola Jokić (Никола Јокић) of the Denver Nuggets wins his second consecutive NBA MVP Award.
  - June 8 — The Walton-Penner family agrees to purchase the Denver Broncos Football Club for $4.65 billion USD, a new world record price for a professional sports franchise.
  - June 21 — Cale Makar of the Colorado Avalanche wins the James Norris Memorial Trophy.
  - June 26 — The Colorado Avalanche defeat the world champion Tampa Bay Lightning four games to two to win their third Stanley Cup. Cale Makar is awarded the Conn Smythe Trophy.
  - October 12 — U.S. President Joe Biden issues a proclamation creating Camp Hale-Continental Divide National Monument on 53,804 acres (217.74 km^{2}) of White River National Forest. The United States Forest Service will manage the monument.
  - November 8 — Colorado voters reelect Governor Jared Polis and the other four incumbent state officers. Brittany Pettersen is elected U.S. Representative for the 7th Congressional District, and Yadira Caraveo is elected for the new 8th Congressional District. U.S. Senator Michael Bennet and the six incumbent U.S. Representatives are reelected. Democrats retain control of the Colorado General Assembly.
  - November 19 — A gunman invades the Club Q nightclub in Colorado Springs and shoots 24 people, killing five, and causes injuries to six more before being subdued by club patrons. The gunman is later arranged on 305 counts.
  - December 31 — The U.S. National Institute of Standards and Technology eliminates the official use of the U.S. survey foot, changing the official U.S. definition of the foot from approximately 304.800 609 601 219 mm to the international foot of exactly 304.8 mm. This slight measurement change alters many traditional survey and elevation measures in Colorado. The Mile-High City is now officially 0.127 inches (3.219 mm) lower than before.
- 2023
  - March 11 — Mikaela Shiffrin of Eagle-Vail wins the slalom ski race at Åre, Sweden setting the all-time world record with 87 International Ski Federation World Cup wins.
  - May 3 — A Denver man is shot to death in an altercation with another Tesla driver over access to an electric charging station in Edgewater.
  - June 12 — The Denver Nuggets defeat the Miami Heat four games to one to win the 2023 NBA Finals and the Larry O'Brien Championship Trophy, their first in franchise history. Nikola Jokić (Никола Јокић) wins the Bill Russell NBA Finals MVP Award.
  - June 13 — Ten people are wounded in a Denver gunfight in the hours after the Denver Nuggets won the 2023 NBA Finals.
  - June 23 — Trey Parker and Matt Stone reopen Casa Bonita in Lakewood which they modestly bill as The Greatest Restaurant in the World!
  - July 17 — Mike Johnston is inaugurated as the 46th Mayor of the City and County of Denver.
  - July 22 — Sophia Smith of Windsor scores two goals in her first FIFA Women's World Cup appearance and team co-captain Lindsey Horan of Golden scores another goal to lead the United States to a 3–0 victory over Vietnam in Auckland, New Zealand.
  - September 13 — Five Colorado restaurants are awarded Michelin Guide Stars: Bosq in Aspen; Frasca Food and Wine in Boulder, and Beckon, Brutø, and The Wolf's Tailor in Denver.
  - September 15 — The United States Board on Geographic Names votes to rename 14,271-foot (4,350 m) Mount Evans as Mount Blue Sky.
  - September 17 — Sepp Kuss, "The Durango Kid," of Durango wins the 2023 Vuelta a España with Team Jumbo–Visma.
  - October 3 — U.S. Representative Ken Buck votes with seven other Republican representatives to remove Kevin McCarthy as Speaker of the United States House of Representatives.
  - November 17 — Colorado District Court Judge Sarah B. Wallace rules that Donald Trump did incite an insurrection against the United States in the January 6 United States Capitol attack, but the 14th Amendment to the United States Constitution does not preclude his appearance on a Colorado Presidential Primary ballot.
  - December 19 — In a four-to-three decision, the Colorado Supreme Court overrules District Court Judge Sarah B. Wallace and rules that Donald Trump is no longer eligible to seek public office under the 14th Amendment to the United States Constitution.
  - December 27 — U.S. Representative Lauren Boebert announces that she will not run for re-election from Colorado's 3rd congressional district in southwestern Colorado, but that she will instead seek election from Colorado's 4th congressional district in northeastern Colorado.
- 2024
  - January 23 — Former Colorado Rockies third baseman Todd Helton is elected to the Baseball Hall of Fame.
  - February 8 — The Town of Keystone incorporates as a home rule municipality.
  - March 4 — The United States Supreme Court rules in an unsigned ruling with no dissent in Trump v. Anderson that the Colorado Supreme Court erred when it blocked Donald Trump from seeking public office.
  - March 22 — Ken Buck resigns as U.S. Representative for Colorado's 4th congressional district, reducing the Republican majority in the United States House of Representatives to 218–213. Buck cites congressional dysfunction as the reason for his resignation.
  - April 13 — The University of Denver men's ice hockey team defeats the Boston College men's ice hockey team by 2–0 to win the NCAA Division I men's ice hockey championship for a record tenth time.
  - May 8 — Nikola Jokić (Никола Јокић) of the Denver Nuggets wins his third NBA MVP Award in four seasons.
  - June 25 — Greg Lopez wins the congressional vacancy election for Colorado's 4th congressional district seat vacated by Ken Buck on March 22. Lopez will take office on July 8.
  - June 27 — Nathan MacKinnon of the Colorado Avalanche wins both the NHL Hart Memorial Trophy and the Ted Lindsay Award.
  - August 5 — Valarie Allman of Longmont wins her second consequetive gold medal for the women's discus throw with a throw of 195.2 feet (59.50 m) at the Games of the XXXIII Olympiad in Paris.
  - August 7 — Team USA wins the women's cycling team pursuit with an average speed of 36.625 mph (58.942 km/h) at the Games of the XXXIII Olympiad in Paris. As a member of the four rider team, Jennifer Valente of Colorado Springs wins an Olympic gold medal.
  - August 7 — Sarah Hildebrandt of Colorado Springs wins the gold medal for women's 50 kilogram freestyle wrestling at the Games of the XXXIII Olympiad in Paris.
  - August 10 — Mallory Swanson of Highlands Ranch scores the lone goal as Team USA defeats Brazil 1–0 to win the women's football (soccer) tournament at the Games of the XXXIII Olympiad in Paris. Mallory with four goals in tournament play, Sophia Smith of Windsor with three goals and two assists, and Team Captain Lindsey Horan of Golden with two assists receive Olympic gold medals.
  - August 11 — Jennifer Valente of Colorado Springs wins her second consequetive gold medal for the women's cycling omnium with 144 points at the Games of the XXXIII Olympiad in Paris. She becomes the most decorated U.S. female Olympic cyclist ever with three gold and two silver Olympic medals.
  - August 12 — A Mesa County jury finds former Mesa County Clerk Tina Peters guilty of one count of conspiracy to commit criminal impersonation, three counts of attempting to influence a public servant, first-degree official misconduct, violation of duty, and failure to comply with an order from the Secretary of State in her attempt to prove election fraud in the 2020 U.S. presidential election. The jury finds Peters not guilty of a second count of conspiracy to commit criminal impersonation, criminal impersonation, and identity theft. Peters is the only election official convicted of criminal charges involving stolen election conspiracy theories of the 2020 election.
  - September 12 — The United States Army decommissions the Pueblo Chemical Depot.
  - November 5 — In the 2024 General Election, Colorado voters elect ten U.S. Presidential Electors for Vice President Kamala Harris. Voters elect four Republicans to the U.S. House of Representatives: Jeff Hurd for the 3rd District, Lauren Boebert for the 4th District, Jeff Crank for the 5th District, and Gabe Evans for the 8th District; and re-elect four of the five incumbent Democratic U.S. Representatives. Democrats retain control of the Colorado General Assembly. Voters add Reproductive Freedom Amendment 79 to the Constitution of Colorado.
  - December 14 — Travis Hunter of the University of Colorado Buffaloes football team wins the 2024 Heisman Trophy.
- 2025
  - February 27 — The United States Department of Commerce announces the abrupt firing of hundreds of National Oceanic and Atmospheric Administration workers in Colorado. These firings are part of the Project 2025 effort to reduce federal support for scientific research in the United States.
  - March 13 — American Airlines Flight 1006, a Boeing 737-800 flying from Colorado Springs Airport en route to Dallas-Fort Worth International Airport diverted to Denver International Airport in Colorado after experiencing high engine vibrations. After landing, the right engine caught fire shortly before or shortly after arriving at the gate. No emergency had previously been declared, and emergency fire equipment did not arrive for several minutes. Several dozen passengers deplaned using the left over-wing exits, but had to wait for ground crew to bring air stairs and ramps since trailing-edge wing flaps were not deployed as a slide. The other passengers used the air bridge and the right rear inflatable slide. All 172 passengers and 6 crew aboard the flight were evacuated safely, although twelve passengers were taken to the hospital with minor injuries.
  - June 1 — In a terror attack in Boulder, a Cimarron Hills man burns 15 predominately elderly persons demonstrating in support of Israeli hostages in Gaza. Karen Diamond, 82 of Boulder, will die on June 25 from her injuries.
  - June 11 — Cale Makar of the Colorado Avalanche wins his second James Norris Memorial Trophy.
  - July 10 — Wildfires erupt on both rims of Black Canyon of the Gunnison National Park, closing the park. Dry thunderstorms ignite numerous wildfires in the region.
  - July 27 — American Airlines Flight 3023, a Boeing 737 MAX 8 plane carrying 173 passengers and six crew members on board, aborted takeoff in Denver after a suspected landing gear failure and a fire forced passengers to evacuate via emergency slides. One person was taken a medical facility and five people were evaluated for injuries at the scene.
  - August 2 — Lightening ignites the Lee Fire near Meeker. The wildfire will burn over 216 square miles (560 km^{2}).
  - September 10 — A 16-year-old Evergreen High School student opens fire at the school, seriously wounding two students and then killing himself.
  - December 1 — The United States Department of Energy announces that the National Renewable Energy Laboratory has been renamed the National Laboratory of the Rockies. This renaming reflects the Project 2025 effort to impede renewable energy research in the United States.
  - December 11 — President Donald Trump issues a federal pardon for Tina Peters who is serving a nine year sentence for election tampering in Colorado. Colorado officials ignore the federal pardon.
  - December 17 — Russell Vought, director of the White House Office of Management and Budget, announces that the National Science Foundation will close the National Center for Atmospheric Research in Boulder, the nation's premier center for weather and climate research. This dismantlement is part of the Project 2025 effort to impede weather and climate research in the United States.
  - December 22 — The White House announces that Colorado has been denied Federal Emergency Management Agency (FEMA) assistance for three Colorado natural disasters.
  - December 30 — President Donald Trump vetoes H.R. 131, the Finish the Arkansas Valley Conduit Act, sponsored by Representative Lauren Boebert.
- 2026
  - January 1 — A Fort Collins woman is killed by a cougar while hiking on the Crosier Mountain Trail near Glen Haven.
  - January 6 — The United States Department of Health and Human Services announces $10 billion cuts to child care and other programs in California, Colorado, Illinois, Minnesota, and New York. Governor Jared Polis suspects retribution.
  - January 24 — Amber McReynolds, Chair of the Board of Governors of the United States Postal Service, and Colorado Governor Jared Polis unveil the Colorado statehood sesquicentennial postage stamp at the History Colorado Center in Denver. The forever stamp was designed by USPS art director Derry Noyes and features a photograph of 13,826-foot (4,214 m) Jagged Mountain in the Weminuche Wilderness by Colorado nature photographer John Fielder.
  - February 22 — The 2026 Winter Olympics conclude in Italy. Mikaela Shiffrin of Edwards, Alex Ferreira of Aspen, Elizabeth Lemley of Vail, Jaccob Slavin of Erie, and Ellie Kam, Daniel O'Shea, and Amber Glenn of Colorado Springs win Olympic Gold Medals.
  - April 1 — March temperature records are shattered across Colorado. Denver International Airport reports a March 2026 average temperature of 51.6 °F (10.9 °C), 10.1 °F (5.6 °C) above the historic Denver March average.
  - April 16 — The Colorado Avalanche win the National Hockey League's Presidents' Trophy with a regular season record of 55 wins, 16 losses, and 11 ties. The Avalanche will loose the Western Conference Finals.
  - May 8 — Frontier Airlines Flight 4345 strikes an unhoused Colorado Springs man during an attempted takeoff from Denver International Airport. The upper portion of the man's body was sucked into the plane's right engine, causing a fire and aborting the takeoff. A total of 224 passengers and seven crew members were evacuated from the plane, with five passengers taken to local hospitals. The trespasser's death was later ruled a suicide.
  - May 15 — Colorado Governor Jared Polis commutes the state prison sentence of Tina Peters, the former Mesa County clerk convicted of tampering with election equipment, from nine years to 18 months.
  - June 27 — The Knowles Fire ignites 19 miles (31 km) west of Grand Junction. Five helitack firefighters are caught in a burnover entrapment that night which kills three, and a fourth will later die from burns. The Knowles Fire will soon merge with the Jones, Snyder Mesa, and Gore fires in Utah to form the combined Snyder Fire which will burn 28,264 acres (114.38 km^{2}).
  - June 27 — The Ferris Fire ignites northeast of Pleasant View. Up to 1,105 firefighters attempt to control the wildfire which will burn 64,881 acres (262.56 km^{2}).
  - June 29 — The Aspen Acres Fire ignites 10 miles (16 km) northwest of Rye, Colorado. Up to 1,934 firefighters attempt to control the wildfire which will destroy over 850 structures including 319 homes and burn 102,004 acres (412.80 km^{2}) to become the Colorado's eighth most extensive wildfire. On August 16, Henry Humphreys of Beulah drowned as a flash flood raged through the burn scar.
  - July 12 — Pilot Nicholas Dale dies as his Kaman K-1200 helicopter crashes into Silver Jack Reservoir while fighting the Gold Mountain Fire.
  - July 28 — The Colorado Secretary of State declares that the Town of Hartman had been abandoned after all the town trustees had resigned.
  - August 1 — The State of Colorado celebrates the sequicentennial of its statehood. Colorado joined the Union on August 1, 1876, four weeks after the United States Centennial Celebration, to become the 38th U.S. state.
  - November 3 — Colorado voters elect Phil Weiser as Governor, Lesley Dahlkemper as Lieutenant Governor, Amanda Gonzalez as Secretary of State, Jeff Bridges as Treasurer, and Jena Griswold as Attorney General. John Hickenlooper is reelected Junior U.S. Senator. Melat Kiros is elected U.S. Representative for CD 1, Eileen Laubacher for CD 4, Jessica Killin for CD 5, Manny Rutinel for CD 8, and the incumbents are reelected in the other four congressional districts. Democrats win supermajorities in both houses of the General Assembly.
  - November 16 — U.S. Representative Gabe Evans, defeated for relection for Colorado's 8th congressional district, announces that he will seek election to Colorado's 4th congressional district in 2028.
Ancient 1500s 1600s 1700s 1800s Territory Statehood 1900s 2000s

== See also ==
- Bibliography of Colorado
- Geography of Colorado
- History of Colorado
- Index of Colorado-related articles
- List of Colorado-related lists
  - List of National Register of Historic Places in Colorado
  - List of Colorado legislatures
  - Cities:
    - Timeline of Aurora, Colorado
    - Timeline of Boulder, Colorado
    - Timeline of Colorado Springs, Colorado
    - Timeline of Denver
  - Timeline of mining in Colorado
- Outline of Colorado
