= Sierra Madre National Forest =

Former national forest in Wyoming

Coordinates: 41.439°N 106.796°W

Sierra Madre National Forest was established as the Sierra Madre Forest Reserve by the U.S. Forest Service in Wyoming on November 5, 1906 with 370,911 acres (1,501.02 km^{2}). It became a National Forest on March 4, 1907. On July 1, 1908 the entire forest was combined with Park Range National Forest to create Hayden National Forest and the name was discontinued.
