= Platte County, Colorado Territory =

Former county of Colorado Territory, United States (1872–1874)

Coordinates: 40.5°N 104.00°W

Platte County was an unorganized county of the Territory of Colorado that existed for two years from 1872 to 1874. Platte County was created from, and reverted to, Weld County, Colorado.

== History ==
On February 9, 1872, the Colorado General Assembly created Platte County from the eastern portion of Weld County. Platte County expired on February 9, 1874, after organizers failed to secure voter approval. The territory of the county reverted to Weld County.

== See also ==
- Outline of Colorado
- Index of Colorado-related articles
- Historic Colorado counties
  - Weld County, Colorado
