= Pike's Peak Country =

Gold mining region in the western USA

Pike's Peak Country was the name given to the gold mining region of the western United States near Pikes Peak during the Pike's Peak Gold Rush of 1858–1861. The Pike's Peak Country included the region of western Kansas Territory roughly west of the 104th meridian west and the region of southwestern Nebraska Territory roughly west of the 104th meridian west and south of the 41st parallel north. The Pike's Peak Country became the heart of the extralegal Jefferson Territory on October 24, 1859, and the Colorado Territory on February 28, 1861.

== Geography ==
Pikes Peak is located at 38°50′26″N 105°02′38″W (38.840560,-105.043890).
