= Hayden National Forest =

Former national forest in Colorado and Wyoming

Hayden National Forest was established by the U.S. Forest Service in Colorado and Wyoming on July 1, 1908, with 454,911 acres (1,840.96 km^{2}), mostly in Wyoming from Sierra Madre National Forest and part of Park Range National Forest. On August 2, 1929, the entire forest was divided between Medicine Bow National Forest and Routt National Forest and the name was discontinued.
