= Park Range National Forest =

Former National Forest in Colorado, US

Park Range National Forest was established as the Park Range Forest Reserve by the U.S. Forest Service in Colorado on June 12, 1905 with 757,116 acres (3,063.94 km^{2}). It became a National Forest on March 4, 1907. On July 1, 1908 the entire forest was divided between Routt National Forest and Hayden National Forest and the name was discontinued.
