= Roger W. Toll =

American mountaineer and author (1883–1936)

- Born: October 17, 1883; Denver, Colorado, United States
- Died: February 25, 1936 (aged 52); Deming, New Mexico, United States
- Education: Columbia University
- Occupations: National Park administrator; mountaineer
- Relatives: Samuel Wolcott (grandfather); Edward O. Wolcott (uncle); Anna Wolcott Vaile (aunt)

Roger Wolcott Toll (October 17, 1883 – February 25, 1936) was an American mountaineer, writer, and a National Park Service official who served as the superintendent of Mount Rainier, Rocky Mountain, and Yellowstone National Parks.

== Biography ==
Toll was born in Denver on October 17, 1883, the second of four sons of Charles Hansen Toll and Katherine Wolcott Toll, who is the daughter of Congregationalist minister Samuel Wolcott, a distant relative of colonial governor Roger Wolcott and United States Founding Father Oliver Wolcott. His uncle, Edward O. Wolcott, was a United States senator from Denver, and his aunt was the educator Anna Wolcott Vaile.

Toll graduated from Manual High School in Denver and attended the University of Denver for one year before transferring to Columbia University, from which he graduated with a B.S. in engineering in 1906.

After graduation, he spent a year traveling around the world before returning to work for the Massachusetts Department of Public Health. In 1908, he was hired by the United States Coast and Geodetic Survey and was tasked to survey the coastline of Cook Inlet in Alaska from April to October 1908. Upon his return, Toll began a position with the Denver Tramway Company, eventually being promoted to chief engineer of the company. He was also one of the founding members of the Colorado Mountain Club. In 1916, he made the first ascent of Mount Columbia, and named it after his alma mater.

During World War I, Toll served in the Ordnance Corps and was promoted to the rank of major. In the army, Toll befriended Horace M. Albright, who recommended Toll to National Park Service director Stephen T. Mather as a possible candidate for the superintendent position at Mount Rainier National Park. Toll was hired in May 1919 and served as superintendent until 1921, when he transferred to Rocky Mountain National Park as superintendent, serving in the position until 1929. He made the first recorded ascent of Kautz Glacier at Mount Rainier and built the Agnes Vaille Shelter in honor of his cousin, Agnes Wolcott Vaille, who died in a climbing accident.

In 1929, he took over the superintendent's position from Albright at Yellowstone National Park and served as field assistant to director Albright. In 1936, Toll served on a commission to charter potential international parks and wildlife refuges along the Mexico–United States border and died in an automobile accident near Deming, New Mexico that also claimed the life of George Melendez Wright.

He is the namesake for Mount Toll in Colorado. The mountain was officially named in his honor in 1940. Toll Mountain in Texas was named after him in 1948.
