= Colorado Mountain Club =

American non-profit hiking organization

- The Colorado Mountain Club
- Abbreviation: CMC
- Formation: 1912; 114 years ago
- Type: Nonprofit
- Tax ID no.: 84-0410760
- Legal status: 501(c)(3)
- Headquarters: Golden, Colorado
- Region served: Colorado
- Members: ~7,500
- Board President: Peter Hamilton
- Chief Executive Officer: Madeline Bachner Lane
- Website: https://www.cmc.org/

The Colorado Mountain Club (CMC), formed in 1912, is a nonprofit, 501 (c)(3) outdoor education organization based in Golden, Colorado that gathers and disseminates information regarding Colorado's mountains in the areas of art, science, literature and recreation. The club advocates for the preservation of the alpine regions, and was instrumental in the creation of Rocky Mountain National Park. The CMC has its own press with over 30 published titles.

== History ==
The idea for the club is credited to both Mary Sabin and James Grafton Rogers, and the first unofficial club meeting was held at Sabin's home on April 3, 1912 with seven individuals attending. The club charter meeting was held on April 26, 1912, with 25 members meeting to officially establish the club. James Grafton Rogers was elected to serve as the club's first president. The first official club trip took place on April 28, 1912 to Cheesman Park in Denver, followed by the first hike on May 30, 1912 to South Boulder Peak, led by George Barnard. In August 1912, the club held its first annual outing, spending seven days in the Bear Creek Basin, near Mount Evans, which was attended by 21 club members.

From 25 charter members in 1912, the club rapidly grew to 200 members barely a year later, when the CMC became a nonprofit corporation.

In 1914, the club published a resolution endorsing a congressional bill for the establishment of Rocky Mountain National Park.

In 1917, James Rogers resigned as club president and was replaced by Henry Brooks.

In April 1918, the club published the first issue of Trail and Timberline, the club's official newsletter. That same year, the club constructed the Beaver Brook Trail in Golden, Colorado.

In 1919, the club began a campaign for the elimination of advertising signs and billboards in the Denver Mountain Park system. That same year, the club established regional chapters in the cities of Colorado Springs, Colorado and Boulder, Colorado.

In 1921, the club established a regional chapter in Fort Collins. At this point, the club had about one thousand members, with membership dues set at $4 per year.

In 1922, the club rented an official club office in the Denver Chamber of Commerce Building and hired its first paid secretary, Alice Manard.

In 1974, the club purchased its first permanent home in Denver, Colorado. In 1993, the CMC partnered with the American Alpine Club to found the American Mountaineering Center in Golden, Colorado. The building houses the largest mountaineering library in the world, as well as a state-of-the-art museum, which opened in February, 2008, and is named for famed mountaineer Henry Bradford Washburn Jr.

In September 2024, the club announced that the American Mountaineering Center was being sold and the organization would relocate. The new CMC Basecamp is still located in Golden.

== Groups ==
The CMC has a state-level organization along with 12 local groups, serving communities such as Denver, Boulder, Colorado Springs, Pueblo, and Roaring Fork.

== Education ==
The club first ventured into education by forming a mountaineering school in 1939. Today, the club offers classes in a variety of subjects, including wilderness trekking, nature photography, mountaineering, climbing, wilderness first aid, fly fishing, and leadership. Classes are taught by volunteers and often involve lectures and field days.

== Trips ==
Members of the club are able to sign up for trips, most of which take place within the state of Colorado. Trips are led by volunteer trip leaders who handle the planning and organization as well as the execution. Trips may include such activities as hiking, climbing, fishing, and photography and are offered at various levels of difficulty. The club's adventure travel program also provides international travel opportunities.

== Stewardship ==
The CMC has a conservation committee that is active in representing hiker interests in the state of Colorado. It also conducts volunteer trail work throughout the state to help maintain and build hiking trails.

== Fourteeners ==
The CMC is the official repository for summit registers on Colorado's popular fourteeners. It also maintains the comprehensive list of each person who has climbed all 53 of these high peaks. It also provides a free online system called mySummits for hikers to report summits of Colorado's 100 highest peaks.

== Club presidents ==
- James Grafton Rogers (1912-16)
- Henry F. Brooks (1917-18)
- George C. Barnard (1919-20)
- Geo. H. Harvey (1921-23)
- Edwin H. Perkins (1924)
- Edmund B. Rogers (1925, 1927)
- Carl Blaurock (1926, 1932, 1938)
- L. R. "Jack" Kendrick (1928-29)
- Lewis E. Perkins (1930-31)
- Garrat B. Van Wagenen (1934-35)
- David Rosendale (1936)
- H. M. "Mike" Walters (1937)
- C. Earl Davis (1939)
- Harvey T. Sethman (1940)

== Notable club members throughout history ==
- Agnes Vaille, who died while descending from the first winter ascent of the east face of Longs Peak
- Carl Blaurock, one of a pair to first climb all of Colorado's fourteeners
- Mary Cronin, first woman to climb all of Colorado's fourteeners
- Albert Russell Ellingwood, pioneering Colorado mountaineer
- Dick Lamm, former Governor of Colorado
- Enos Mills, whose efforts were influential in establishing Rocky Mountain National Park
- James Grafton Rogers, Denver lawyer and outdoorsman who drafted legislation to create Rocky Mountain National Park
- Roger Toll, who held the positions of superintendent at Yellowstone, Rocky Mountain, and Mount Rainier National Parks
- William Henry Jackson, famous photographer for the Detroit Photographic Company
- Gerry Roach, Colorado-based climber who published numerous hiking guides and was second to climb the seven summits
- Robert Ormes, mountaineering author
- Francis Eugene Bouck, Deputy Attorney General of Colorado
- Ellsworth Bethel, naturalist, namesake of Mount Bethel
