= Lyman M. Bass =

American lawyer

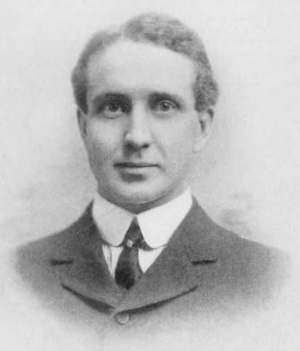

U.S. Attorney for the Western District of New York
- In office 1906–1908
- Appointed by: Theodore Roosevelt
- Preceded by: Charles H. Brown
- Succeeded by: John Lord O'Brian

Personal details
- Born: Lyman Metcalfe Bass; July 5, 1876 Buffalo, New York, U.S.
- Died: July 9, 1955 (aged 79) Buffalo, New York, U.S.
- Party: Republican
- Spouse: Grace Holland (m. 1904)
- Relations: James Stetson Metcalfe (uncle)
- Children: 3
- Parent(s): Lyman K. Bass; Frances Metcalfe Wolcott
- Education: St. Paul's School
- Alma mater: Yale College; Harvard Law School

Lyman Metcalfe Bass (July 5, 1876 – July 9, 1955) was an American attorney from New York.

== Early life ==
Bass was born on July 5, 1876, in Buffalo, New York, the only child of U.S. Representative Lyman K. Bass and Frances Esther Metcalfe. His father was a friend and law partner of President Grover Cleveland. After his father's illness and retirement from Congress, the family moved to Colorado Springs where his mother later married U.S. Senator from Colorado Edward O. Wolcott. His maternal uncle was critic James Stetson Metcalfe.

Bass attended St. Paul's School in Concord, New Hampshire, graduating from there in 1893. He then went to Yale College, graduating from there with honors in 1897. He played end on the Yale football team for three years.

== Career ==
During the Spanish-American War, he served as a Second Lieutenant in Battery F., 3rd U.S. Artillery and fought in Puerto Rico with them. He also served on the staff of Major-General James H. Wilson. After he finished his military service he went to Harvard Law School, graduating with honors and an LL.B. in 1900.

Bass was admitted to the bar shortly after graduating. He returned to Buffalo and spent the next two years in the law office of Rogers, Locke & Milburn. He then worked in the law firm Bissell, Carey & Cooke. becoming a partner of the firm in 1906. He remained with the firm when it was reorganized into Kenefick, Cooke & Mitchell, which was also a successor of his father's old firm, Bass, Cleveland & Bissell. In 1905, Governor Higgins appointed him to the Board of Managers for the State Industrial School in Rochester, a position he held until his resignation in 1907. In 1907, Mayor Adam appointed him Chairman of the Army Post Commission.

A staunch Republican, Bass was appointed United States Attorney for the Western District of New York by President Theodore Roosevelt in 1906. He resigned from the position in 1908 and returned to his law practice. He continued working in the law firm as a senior partner until his death, by then known as Kenefick, Bass, Letchworth, Baldy & Phillips.

== Personal life ==
On August 4, 1904, he married Grace Holland, a daughter of Nelson Holland and Susan (née Clarke) Holland. They had three daughters:

- Susan Holland Bass, who married Frederick de Peyster Townsend Jr. of New York.
- Frances Bass, who married George Appleton of New York.
- Grace Bass, who married Francis G. Salt Jr. of Buffalo.

Bass attended the Protestant Episcopal Church. He was a member of the Saturn Club, the Park Club, the University Club of New York, and the Boone and Crockett Club.

Bass died at home on July 9, 1955. He was buried in Forest Lawn Cemetery in Buffalo.

Legal offices
Preceded by Charles H. Brown	U.S. Attorney for the Western District of New York; 1906–1908	Succeeded by John Lord O'Brian
