= American Theatre Wing =

New York City-based organization

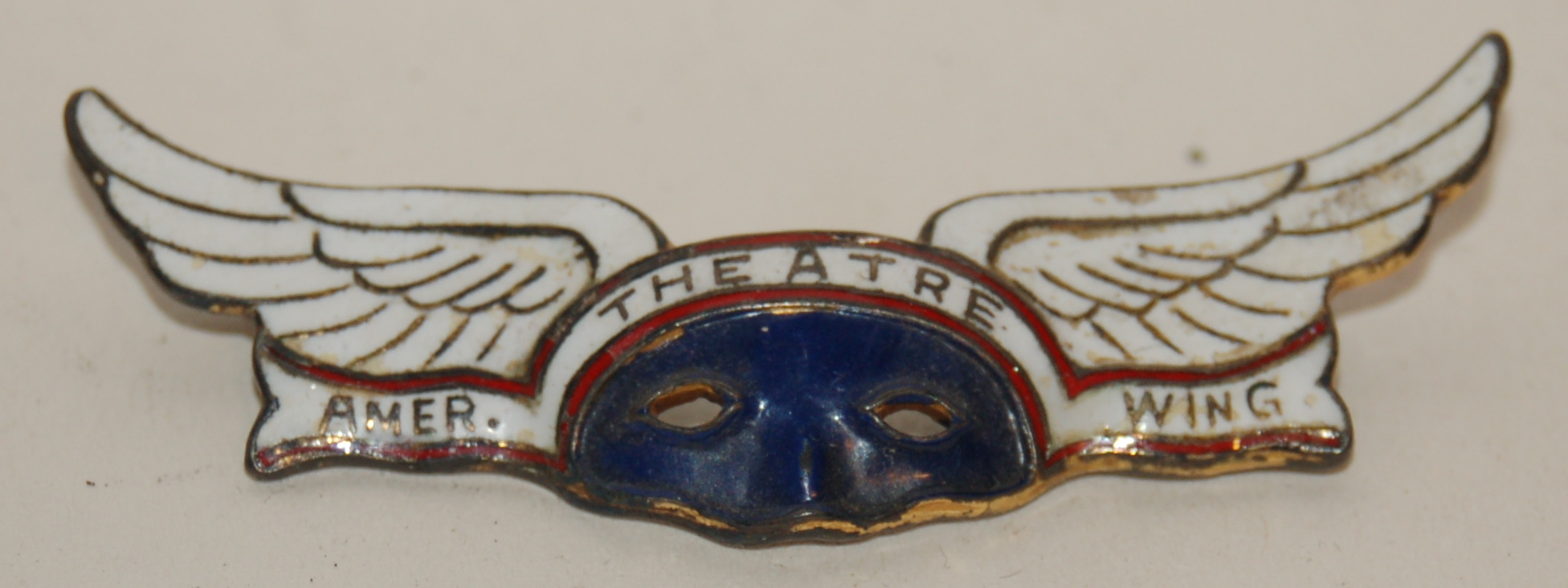
American Theatre Wing lapel pin

The American Theatre Wing (the Wing for short) is a New York City-based nonprofit organization "dedicated to supporting excellence and education in theatre", according to its mission statement. Originally known as the Stage Women's War Relief during World War I, it later became a part of the World War II Allied Relief Fund under its current name. The ATW created and sponsors the Tony Awards for excellence in live Broadway theatre.

== Background ==
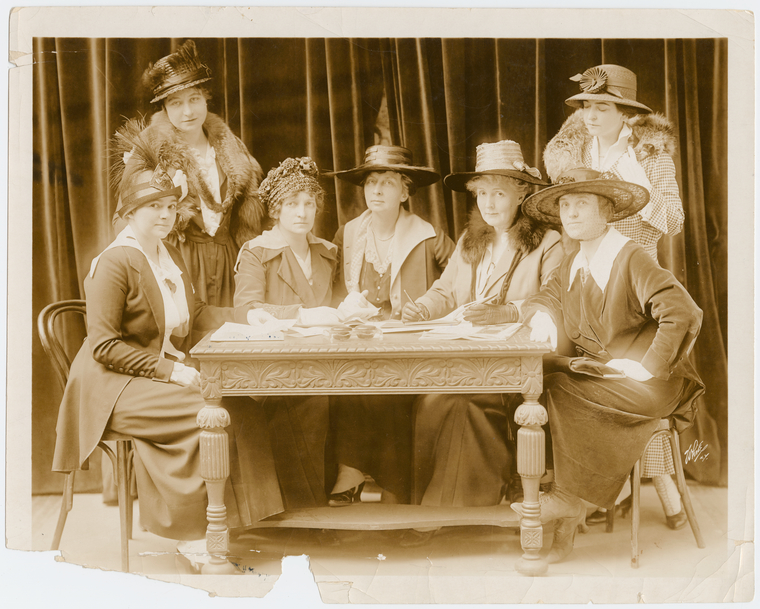
Founding members of Stage Women's War Relief (from left): Mary Kirkpatrick, Dorothy Donnelly, Jessie Bonstelle, Rachel Crothers, Elizabeth Tyree, May Budeley, Eleanor Gates

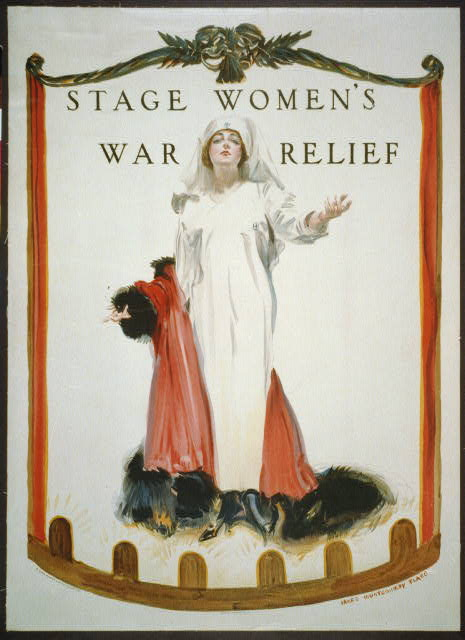
James Montgomery Flagg poster for Stage Women's War Relief (1918)

=== Stage Women's War Relief ===
Stage Women's War Relief was founded in 1917 to organize charitable giving in support of the war effort. Its founders, led by playwright and director Rachel Crothers, included the actress and playwright Louise Closser Hale and actresses Dorothy Donnelly, Josephine Hull, Minnie Dupree, Elizabeth Tyree and Louise Drew. The organization established workrooms for sewing uniforms and other garments (with total output totaling 1,863,645 articles), set up clothing and food collection centers, sold Liberty Bonds, and opened a canteen on Broadway for servicemen. It also presented benefit performances to raise money, including some held in a temporary "Liberty Theater" built outside the New York Public Library. In total, the group raised nearly $7,000,000 for the war effort.

=== The American Theatre Wing of the Allied War Relief ===
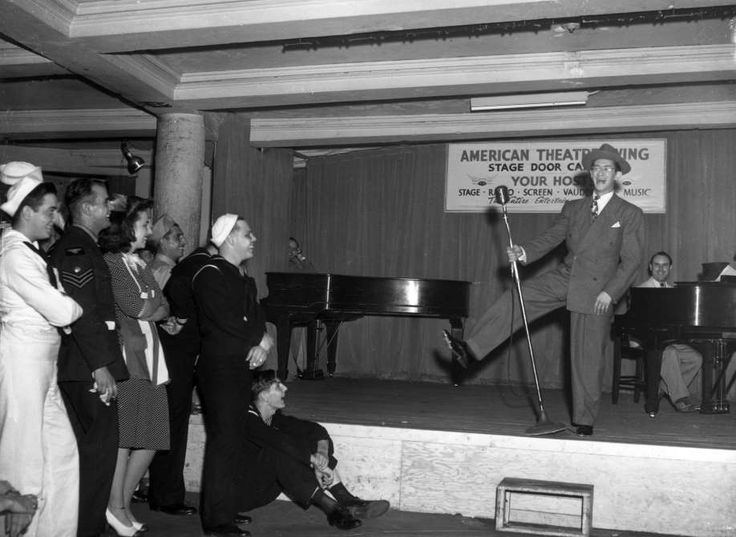
Servicemen enjoying a performance at the New York City Stage Door Canteen in 1942.

Shortly after the beginning of World War II in 1939, Rachel Crothers re-established the Stage Women's War Relief as a branch of the British War Relief Society in January 1940; this time adopting the name the American Theatre Wing (ATW). The revived organization's first and founding members included Mary Antoinette "Toni" Perry, Josephine Hull, Gertrude Lawrence, Theresa Helburn, and Vera Allen; with Louise Heims Beck serving as the organization's first vice president. They began fundraising and organizing clothing donations to send overseas to the British people and to provide relief for European refugees in America. The organization initially worked from two rooms located inside 30 Rockefeller Plaza. In its first few months of operations they successfully lobbied businesses to donate supplies, with donations to the British people from American businessman including 1,000 coats for women and children and 4,000 pounds (1,800 kg) of coffee in addition to medical supplies and other clothing and materials. Others, encompassing both women and men, soon joined the ATW, including Tallulah Bankhead, Ray Bolger, Clare Boothe, Ilka Chase, Lynn Fontanne, Helen Hayes, Burgess Meredith, Cornelia Otis Skinner, and Clifton Webb. In 1941, with the entry of the United States into the war, the organization shifted its focus to the American war effort.

==== Stage Door Canteen ====
Under the leadership of Perry, Heims Beck, and Crothers, the Wing opened the Stage Door Canteen to entertain American servicemen in New York. The first canteen was in the basement of the 44th Street Theatre, and similar entertainment and dining venues were established in Los Angeles, Boston, Washington, D.C., Philadelphia, Cleveland, Newark, and San Francisco, as well as abroad in London and Paris. In the US canteens, servicewomen were denied entry, although this was not the case in the European locations.

Lauren Bacall worked as a hostess in the New York Stage Door Canteen, and later recalled seeing Alfred Lunt and Lynn Fontanne washing dishes and serving coffee there. The Andrews Sisters were frequent performers. The Stage Door Canteen made its way into national popular culture with a 1942 weekly radio show and a 1943 movie called Stage Door Canteen.

=== The American Theatre Wing: post–World War II – present ===
After World War II, the Wing founded The Community Players to assist war veterans and their families on their return home. Co-chair of the Community Players was Katharine Cornell, who was active in the Stage Door Canteen.

With the close of the war, the Wing concentrated on holding seminars about American theater, and on funding numerous scholarship grants. It sponsored the First American Congress of Theatre (FACT) in 1947, but it is best known in contemporary times for having created, in the same year, The American Theatre Wing's Antoinette Perry Awards for Excellence in Theatre, or Tony Awards for short, which it still sponsors and which awards were themselves named for Perry, its co-founder and wartime chair, who had died in 1946. Heims Beck, who was later chairman of the ATW in 1950–1951, was responsible for overseeing the organization of the 1st Tony Awards.

The initial presentation of the Wing's Tony Awards program on radio and television was broadcast only locally in New York City. In 1967, it partnered with the League of American Theatres and Producers, now called The Broadway League, to present them on nationwide network television.

From 1965 to 1998,Isabelle Stevenson was the president of the ATW. After retiring, she served as chairwoman of the board of directors until her death in 2003. A special non-competitive Tony Award, for humanitarian or charitable work, is named in her honor, and is called The Isabelle Stevenson Award. It is Tony's equivalent to the Motion Picture Academy's Jean Hersholt Humanitarian Award.

Sondra Gilman succeeded Stevenson as chair and Doug Leeds served as president from 2004 to 2008. When they completed their four-year terms, Theodore S. (Ted) Chapin assumed both roles from 2008 to 2012. In 2012, Tony Award-winning costume designer William Ivey Long became chair of the board until 2016 when current board chair, the Pulitzer Prize–winning playwright David Henry Hwang, assumed his duties. Angela Lansbury currently serves as honorary chairman and Heather A. Hitchens is president and CEO of the American Theatre Wing.

Besides the Tonys, ATW operates an array of programs to support its goals, including:

- The long-running "Working in the Theatre" series of televised seminars with top practitioners in the field;
- A free audio and video archive of theatrical seminars and discussions on the American Theatre Wing YouTube channel;
- The Jonathan Larson Grants, supporting emerging creators of Musical Theatre
- National Theatre Company Grants, aiding theatre companies and organizations who have articulated a distinctive mission, cultivated an audience and nurtured a community of artists in ways that strengthen the quality, diversity, and dynamism of American theatre.
- SpringboardNYC, a college to career boot camp for actors
- The Theatre Intern Network; a social and professional networking organization for Theatre Interns in New York City
