= Gertrude Vaile =

American social worker (1878–1954)

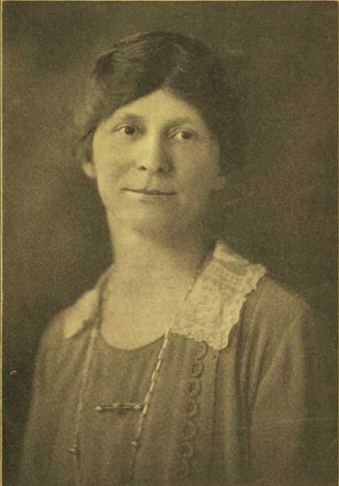
- Born: January 20, 1878; Kokomo, Indiana, U.S.
- Died: October 15, 1954 (aged 76)
- Occupation: social worker
- Known for: Reformer and pioneer in social work education

Gertrude Vaile (January 20, 1878 – October 15, 1954) was an American social worker. Gertrude became the executive secretary to the committee of the National Conference of Charities and Correction in 1916, and was elected to head the National Welfare Workers in 1925 at the National Conference of Social Work.

== Early life and education ==
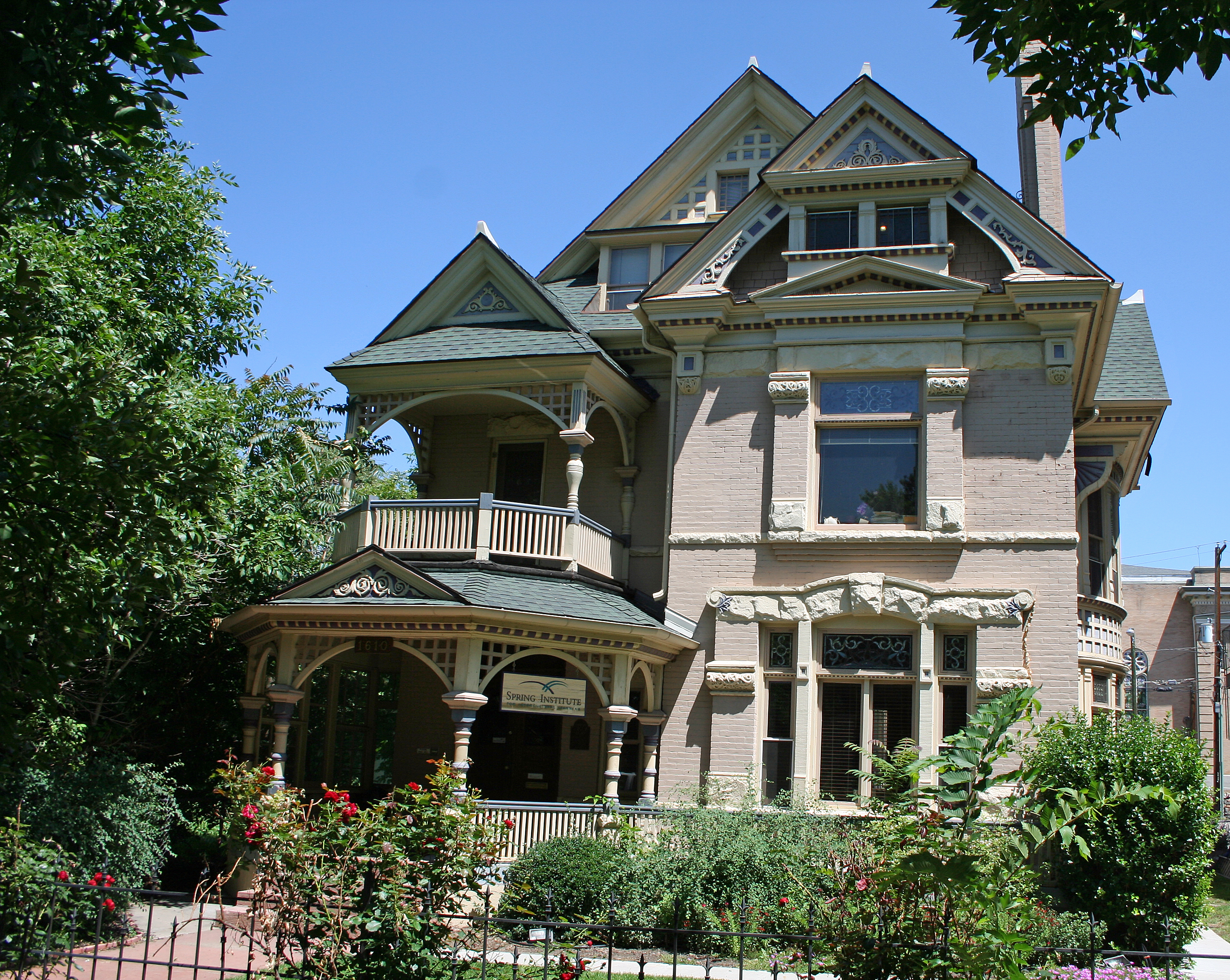
Vaile family home, North Capitol Hill, Denver, Colorado

Gertrude Vaile was born in Kokomo, Indiana, January 20, 1878. Her father was Joel Frederick Vaile, a national authority on general business, mining, and railroad law. Her mother was Charlotte Marion White Vaile (d. 1902), an author of children's books. A brother, William, was a law partner in his father's firm, and a member of Congress. There was a younger brother, Louis F. Vaile, and a younger sister, Lucretia, who served as president of the Colorado Librarian's Association in 1922.

She came to Denver, Colorado at the age of four years.

After graduating from the East Denver High School, she went to Vassar College, where her work was principally in the department of economics and social science, before graduating in 1900. That summer, she sailed for Europe.

After her mother's death, she then spent several years at home housekeeping, and was active in various club and philanthropic societies. Her father then married Anna Louisa Wolcott.

In 1909, Vaile went to Chicago and graduated at the School of Civics and Philanthropy; this school required field work with social or philanthropic agencies, also one term with the United Charities.

== Career ==
"Never before, certainly not in modern times, has there been a time when everything we are thinking and doing is being tested as never before have we tested the foundation of things. Political and industrial ideals are being changed. Ideals of social life and relationships are being called into question, and certainly the ideals of spiritual truth, of our religious life, are all in question. We are testing things by realities. Conventionalities are falling away. We want to know what is true, what is real, and what are the things we need." -Gertrude Vaile (1919)

Vaile relocated to Denver, Colorado, where, in 1912, she was appointed a member of the Board of Charities and Corrections by Mayor Henry J. Arnold. She then entered definitely into the employ of the United Charities, first as a "visitor,” investigating cases of need and carrying out the treatment decided upon by the District Superintendent.

Immediately after, she returned to Chicago, where she served as superintendent of the Englewood district. During her stay in Chicago, she lived at social settlements and other like places where charity work was done. She served as one of the investigators in a study that the Russell Sage Foundation made of the operation of the Mothers' Pension Law in Illinois.

Back in Denver by 1916, she served as Executive Secretary, Bureau of Charities and Correction, and was still in that position in 1925. It was reported in 1919 that through Vaile's efforts, the public poort department of Denver was socialized and converted into a modern progressive organization. At the outbreak of World War I, Valie organized the civilian relief work of the Mountain Division of the American Red Cross and served for some time as director of civilian relief in that difixion. She later became education director under the Red Cross in the same section.

Vaile was the western states field representative of the American Association for Organizing Family Social Work for four years, resigning in 1923, which was occasioned by her desire to settle down in one community.

By 1926, Vaile was in Ames, Iowa, where she served as Executive Secretary and Overseer of the Poor for the Ames Social Service League.

She was a member of the American Association for Organizing Family Social Work.

== Personal life ==
Vaile was a member of the Daughters of the American Revolution. She died October 15, 1954. Subsequently, Gertrude's sister, Lucretia, sent two boxes of material to Columbia University School of Social Work for the Gertrude Vaile Archives.

== Selected works ==
=== Books ===
- A study of aid to dependent children; some cases of mothers with one child receiving ADC grant on March 1, 1947, by Gertrude Vaile, assisted by Blanche Powell Bonner (Denver, Bureau of public welfare, 1948)

=== Articles ===
- "Administering Mothers' Pensions in Denver", 1914
- "Principles and Methods of Outdoor Relief", 1915
- "Interstate Control of Tuberculosis. Will the Kent Bill Help?", 1916
- "Public Administration of Charity in Denver", 1916
- "Federal Aid for consumptives. Would the Kent Bill Help?", 1917
- "Settlement Laws as an Element in the Solution of the Problem of the Migratory Consumptive", 1917
- "Some Organization Problems of Public Welfare Departments", 1922
- "The Cost of Maintaining Good Case Work in a Public Agency", 1925
- "Analysis of Processes in Rural Family Work", 1926
