= Frances Metcalfe Wolcott =

- Born: Frances Esther Metcalfe; May 19, 1851; Buffalo, New York, U.S.
- Died: February 9, 1933 (aged 81); New York City, New York, U.S.
- Spouses: Lyman K. Bass (m. 1874; died 1889) Edward O. Wolcott (m. 1890; div. 1899)
- Children: Lyman M. Bass
- Parent(s): James Harvey Metcalfe; Erzelia Frances Stetson
- Relatives: James Stetson Metcalfe (brother); Elizabeth Tyree (sister-in-law)

Frances Esther Wolcott (née Metcalfe, formerly Bass) (May 19, 1851 – February 9, 1933) was an American socialite and author.

== Early life ==
Fanny, as she was known, was born on May 19, 1851, at her father's house on Swan Street in Buffalo, New York. She was a daughter of James Harvey Metcalfe (1822–1879) and Erzelia Frances (née Stetson) Metcalfe (1832–1913). Among her siblings were James Stetson Metcalfe (a drama critic for Life Magazine and The Wall Street Journal who married Elizabeth Tyree), George Stetson Metcalfe, and Francis Tyler Metcalfe. Her father came to Buffalo from Bath, New York, in 1855 and created a family fortune establishing the First National Bank and the Buffalo, New York and Philadelphia Railroad. He was also an early park commissioner and helped implement Frederick Law Olmsted's plan for the city's park system.

Her paternal great-grandfather was killed in the Tory army at the Battle of Bunker Hill and her grandfather, Thomas Metcalfe, was "taken by his mother to Virginia, where later he freed his Virginia-born slaves and trekked to Central New York".

== Career ==
After her husband's health declined, he did not run for reelection to Congress and they moved to Colorado Springs, Colorado, where he continued the practice of law became general counsel for the Denver and Rio Grande Railroad Company.

She lived all over the world and in 1932, shortly before death, had published by Minton, Balch and Company, Heritage of Years: Kaleidoscopic Memories, a "brilliant work of a sophisticate who looks back over 80 years and tells what she saw during that time." In the prologue to her memoir, she writes:

"The privileges of my life have been great, including the acquaintance of distinguished persons of three continents, audiences with Popes and Kings, intercourse with soldiers, artists, musicians and writes. Those who have attracted me most are those who have had great dreams and striven to make them reality."

Among her many friends and acquaintances were architect Stanford White (who with his firm, McKim, Mead & White built her mother's home in Buffalo), diplomat John Buchan, poet Helen Hunt Jackson, and author Richard Le Gallienne. At Hillcrest, her country estate, she hosted "Theodore Roosevelt, Alice Roosevelt Longworth, Mark Twain, Ethel Barrymore and Karl Bitter, a famous sculptor."

== Personal life ==
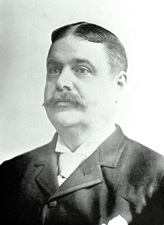
Her second husband, Senator Edward O. Wolcott.

In 1874, Fanny married U.S. Representative Lyman Kidder Bass (1836–1889) in Buffalo. He was a law partner of president Grover Cleveland and Wilson S. Bissell (later former Postmaster General). Before his death from consumption in 1889, they were the parents of one child:

- Lyman Metcalfe Bass (1876–1955), the U.S. Attorney for the Western District of New York who married Grace Holland, a daughter of Nelson Holland, in 1904.

After Bass' death in 1877, she married Edward O. Wolcott, the then youngest member of the U.S. Senate in 1890 and a direct descendant of Oliver Wolcott, signer of the United States Declaration of Independence. They were married by The Rev. Francis Lobdell at St. Paul's Cathedral in Buffalo. In Washington, they lived in a mansion on Connecticut Avenue, "in the immediate neighborhood of the British Ambassador, and in the very heart of the fashionable set." They later divorced in 1899. Senator Wolcott died in 1905 while on vacation in Europe.

After the divorce, she bought Hillcrest, a 32-room mansion in Pavilion, New York, in the Genesee Valley. Fanny died in New York on February 9, 1933. After a funeral service at her son's residence in Buffalo, she was buried at Forest Lawn Cemetery there.
