= Flower-Vaile House =

- U.S. National Register of Historic Places
- Colorado State Register of Historic Properties
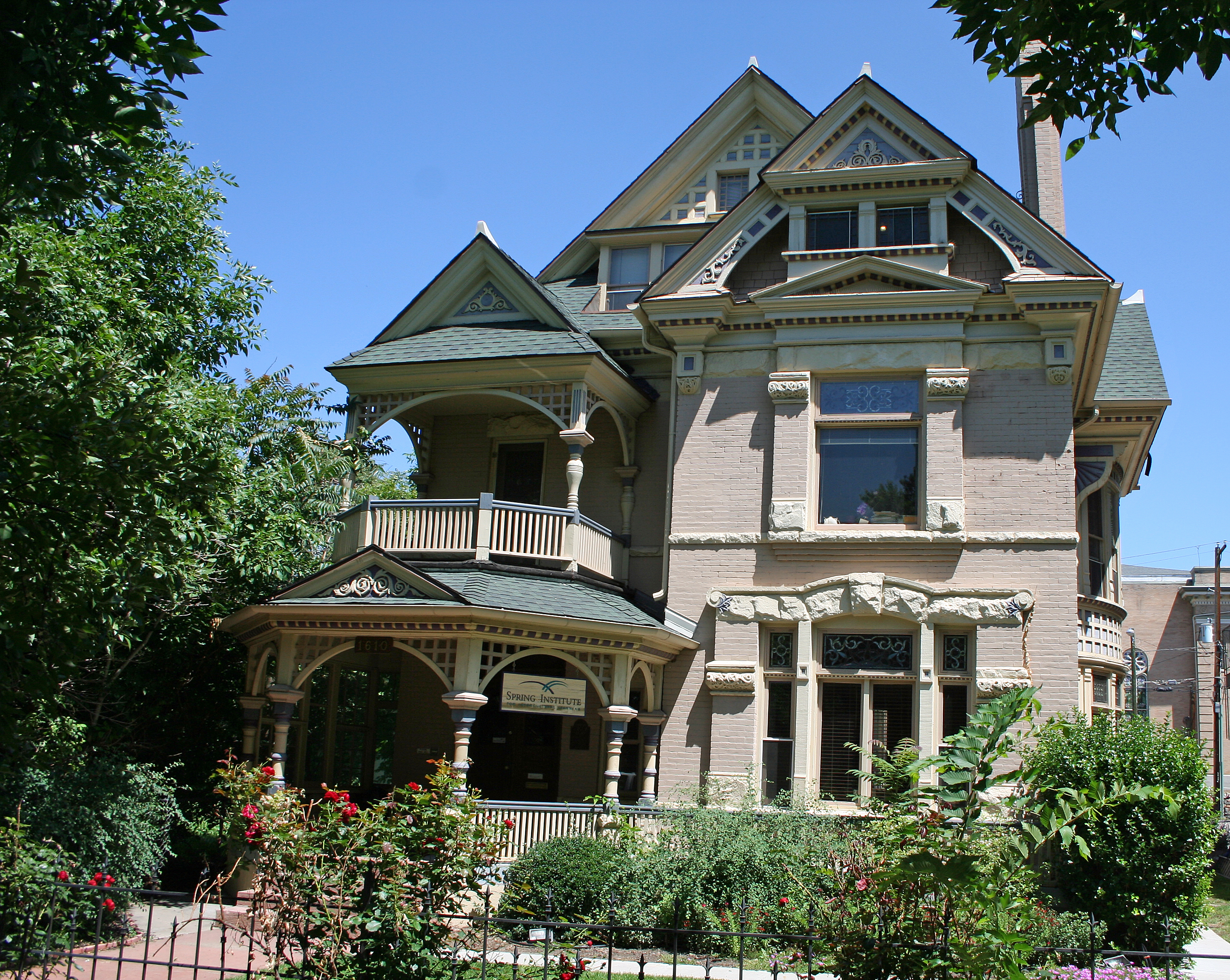

- Location within Colorado Location within the United States
- Location: 1610 Emerson Street, North Capitol Hill, Denver, Colorado
- Coordinates: 39°44′32″N 104°58′31″W
- Built: 1889
- Architect: Balcombe and Rice
- NRHP reference No.: 82001010
- Added to NRHP: October 21, 1982

Flower-Vaile House is a historic house in North Capitol Hill, Denver, Colorado. The house was designed by Balcombe and Rice and built by D. S. Gray. It was designated a Denver Landmark on October 13, 1981 and was listed on the National Register of Historic Places on October 21, 1982. Richard R. Brettel described the house in Historic Denver as a prime example of "decorative or surface style eclecticism added to the basic Queen Anne Street house — very common in Denver by the mid- to late-1880s."

It was first owned by John S. Flower, who was a real estate developer in Denver and a close friend of Mayor Robert W. Speer. The house is historically significant for its association with attorney Joel F. Vaile and his family, who were leaders in the economic and social development of the Denver area and the state of Colorado. Vaile bought the house in 1890. He was an attorney, prosecutor, and president of the Colorado Bar Association. A founding member of the law firm Wolcott, Vaile, and Waterman, Vaile was a national authority on general business, mining, and railroad law. His arguments were adopted by the U.S. Supreme Court in the case of Del Monte Mining and Milling v. Last Chance Mining and Milling, 171 U.S. 55, 18 S.Ct. 895, 43 L.Ed. 72 (1898). Vaile was first married to Charlotte M. White Vaile, an author of children's books. Their son William was his law partner and a member of Congress. Their first daughter, Gertrude, became the executive secretary to the committee of the National Conference on Charities and Correction in 1916, and was elected to head the National Welfare Workers in 1925. Their second daughter, Lucretia, became president of the Colorado Librarian's Association in 1922.

Charlotte died in 1902. In 1912, he married Anna Louisa Wolcott, who established and ran the Wolcott School for Girls. One year after retiring, Joel F. Vaile died in 1916 in Pasadena, California. The house remained in the family until 1927. It was then converted into an apartment building, Traymore Apartments, until early 1981 when it underwent renovation.
