= Samuel Wolcott =

American Congregationalist minister, missionary and writer of hymns (1813–1886)

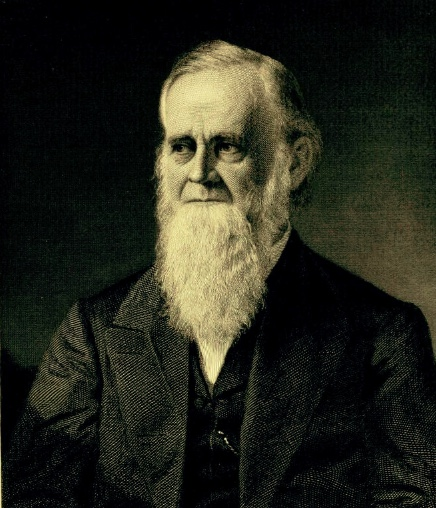
- Samuel Wolcott, c. 1881
- Born: July 2, 1813; South Windsor, Connecticut, US
- Died: February 24, 1886 (aged 72); Longmeadow, Massachusetts, US
- Education: Yale College; Andover Theological Seminary
- Spouse(s): Caroline Wood (m. 1839; died 1841) Harriet Pope (m. 1843)
- Children: 11, including Edward and Anna
- Relatives: Roger W. Toll (grandson)

Samuel Wolcott (July 2, 1813 – February 24, 1886) was an American Congregationalist minister, missionary, and writer of hymns. During the American Civil War, he regularly gave public speeches about the war.

== Early life and education ==
Wolcott was born in South Windsor, Connecticut on July 2, 1813. He was a descendant of Oliver Wolcott, signer of the United States Declaration of Independence. He graduated from Yale College in 1833 and Andover Theological Seminary in 1837.

== Career ==
Wolcott was with the American Board of Commissioners for Foreign Missions at Boston for two years. He was ordained in November 1839. The following April he went to Beirut, which was then in the Ottoman Empire, where he was a missionary. During that time, he saw the bombardment of Beirut by English and allied forces and Syria retaken from Mehemet Ali of Egypt. Wolcott's experiences in the Middle East–including his work at Jerusalem, Damascus, and other areas in the Palestine–were published in several theological books.

Christ for the world we sing.
The world to Christ we bring

With loving zeal.

The poor and them that mourn,
The faint and overborne,
Sin-sick and sorrow-worn,

Whom Christ doth heal.

–From one of Wolcott's more popular hymns

His first wife died in Syria in 1841 and his health began to decline, so he returned to the United States in 1843. He then began his work as a pastor, which extended over 30 years. He had pastorates in Longfellow and Belchertown, Massachusetts, Providence, Rhode Island; Chicago, and Cleveland. He began writing hymns in 1869, when he developed a hymn while on a walk. Each stanza began, "Christ for the world we sing, The world to Christ we bring." He composed more than 200 hymns, not all of which were published.

He was a public speaker, and during the American Civil War, he regularly gave speeches about the latest news of the war. His sons had enlisted in the war, including 16-year-old Edward.

In 1874, he was made secretary of the Ohio Home Missionary Society and served in that position until 1882. During that time, he wrote Memorial of Henry Wolcott, one of the first settlers of Windsor, Connecticut, and of some of his descendants.

== Personal life ==
Wolcott was married first to Caroline Elizabeth Wood on September 5, 1839. She went with him to the Middle East and died in Syria on October 26, 1841. He then married Harriet Amanda (Pope) Wolcott on November 1, 1843. They had eleven children. As of 1889, ten of the children were: Samuel Adams raised stock near San Antonio, Texas. Henry Roger was a capitalist living in Denver. Edward Oliver a United States senator from Denver. William Edgar was a Congregationalist minister in Lawrence, Massachusetts. Herbert Walker was a lawyer in Denver. Agnes Vaile lived with her husband at Lexington, Massachusetts. Mrs. Charles H. Toll of Colorado, who was the mother of mountaineer Roger Wolcott Toll. At that time, three daughters lived at home with their mother, Anna, Clara, and Charlotte. His daughter, Anna Louisa, established the elite Wolcott School for Girls in Denver.

He returned to Longmeadow in 1882, living there until his death on February 24, 1886.

== See also ==
- Johann Friedrich Röhr, who published Wolcott's accounts of the Palestine
