= Gerry Roach =

American mountaineer

- Born: September 8, 1943 (age 82)
- Education: University of Washington
- Occupation: Mountaineer
- Spouses: Barbara Adair (m. 1966); Deirdre Garvey (m. 1987); Jennifer Sears (m. 1998)

Gerry Roach is an American mountaineer and author based out of Colorado.

== Early life ==
Gerry was born Gerard Allyn Roach in Glendale, California and moved to Boulder, Colorado in 1954, where he picked up the sport of rock climbing and mountaineering. His first climbing attempt in 1955 involved using a clothesline as a rope on the flatirons of Boulder with his friend Jeff Wheeler. They later bought better equipment from the Holubar mountaineering store in Boulder, which allowed for safer climbing. In July 1957, he climbed his first Colorado Fourteener, Mount Massive. In 1959, he traveled with 3 friends to Mexico, where they climbed three Mexican volcanoes: Pico de Orizaba, Popocatépetl, and Iztaccihuatl.

== 1963 Denali expedition ==
In 1963, Gerry joined Dick Springgate, Geoffrey Wheeler, and Mike McCoy on an expedition to climb Denali in Alaska. On June 18, the expedition took a plane from Talkeetna to the base of the mountain, where they established a base camp at 7,200 feet. The group was able to reach the summit on July 4 and spent 2 hours at the top before descending.

== 1975 Colorado fourteener completion ==
On July 7, 1975, Gerry climbed to the summit of Crestone Peak in Colorado, which made him the 165th person to climb all 54 of the Colorado fourteeners recognized by the Colorado Mountain Club. The list of mountains took 18 years for him to complete.

== 1976 American Bicentennial Everest expedition ==
In 1976, he joined the American Bicentennial Everest Expedition to climb Mount Everest, joining climbers Phillip Trimble, Hans Bruyntjes, Arlene Blum, Chris Chandler, Robert Cormack, Dee Crouch, Daniel Emmett, Frank Morgan, Joseph Reinhard, Richard Ridgeway, and Barbara Roach. On July 27, the team arrived in Kathmandu and organized a team of roughly 600 porters to carry the expedition gear to Everest Base Camp, departing on August 3 and establishing the camp on August 25. On September 3, Camp I was fully established, followed by Camps II on September 8. After a six-day storm, Camp III was established on September 18, followed by Camp IV on September 22nd and Camp V on October 1. On October 5, the expedition's first summit team departed Camp II, reaching Camp V and on October 6, and Camp VI on October 7. Climbers Chris Chandler and Robert Cormack from the expedition's first summit team were able to summit successfully and descend on October 8.

The second team, including Gerry Roach, Rick Ridgeway, Hans Bruyntjes, left Camp II on October 7, reaching Camp IV on October 8. On October 9, they left for the summit, but were forced to turn back at the South Col after weather conditions deteriorated, resulting in winds greater than 100 miles per hour. Due to ongoing weather issues and supply shortages, the expedition decided to retreat from the mountain and abandon further summit attempts.

== 1978 Manaslu expedition ==
In 1978, Gerry joined an expedition to summit Manaslu along with climbers Glenn Porzak, Charles Clark, Lee Crouch, Bruce Gordon, John Gordon, Paul Parker, David Jones, and Sandy Read. The team arrived at base camp on March 10 and Camp I on March 14, followed by Camp II on March 23. The expedition experienced a multitude of storms over the month of March and April, culminating in twenty feet of snowfall over a month period. On April 10, they were able to establish Camp III at 21,300 feet. The expedition was able to establish Camp IV on April 15 at 24,000 feet before ongoing storms and low supplies forced the expedition to descend and abandon the expedition on April 29.

== 1983 Seven Summits Everest expedition ==
In 1983, Gerry joined the Seven Summits Everest Expedition, along with Frank Wells, Richard Bass, Jim States, Gary Neptune, Larry Nielson, Peter Jamieson, and Sherpa Ang Rita. Gerry was successful in reaching the summit of Mount Everest on May 7, 1983, becoming the 12th American to summit the peak.

== 1985 Antarctica expedition ==
In 1985, Gerry joined an expedition to climb mountains in Antarctica, joining Glenn Porzak, Yvon Chouinard, Doug Tompkins, Dan Emmett, Dan Bass, Frank Morgan, and Phil Trimble. On December 13, 1985, he summited Mount Vinson with climbing partner Glenn Porzak, which made him the second person to climb the seven summits.

== 1994 Carstensz Pyramid expedition ==
In 1994, Gerry joined climbers Glenn Porzak, Chris Pizzo, Chris Kopczynski, Dave Graber, and Wayne Hutchens an expedition to New Guinea to climb Carstensz Pyramid. On April 22, they arrived at the town of Ilaga, Central Papua, where they organized porters and supplies, before embarking on a seven-day trek to base camp. Gerry was able to summit the mountain on May 3 after a 12-hour climb.

== 1997 Gasherbrum II expedition ==
In 1997, Gerry joined an expedition to climb Gasherbrum II in the Karakoram range, along with climbers Gary Neptune, John Goggin, Clyde Soles, Fred Barth, Allen Gionati, Kimberly Knox, Eric Havlik, Stan Havlik, Kevin Volz, and Bob Ader. The team departed Denver on May 16, 1997, and flew to Pakistan, where they organized supplies and permits and proceeded to the Baltoro Glacier for the trek to base camp, which took eight days. It took the team a further 18 days to establish a climbing route through the South Gasherbrum Glacier to an advanced base camp at 19,500 feet. From there, the expedition established Banana Camp at 21,000 feet, Ridge Camp at 22,500 feet, and High Camp at 24,000 feet. On July 13, Gerry was able to complete a final summit push and spend three hours there before descending.

== 2000 Mount St. Elias expedition ==
On May 16, 2000, Gerry reached the summit of Mount St. Elias in Alaska, which made him the first person to climb the 10 highest peaks in North America.

== 2023 Climbing accident ==
In August 2023, Gerry was climbing an unnamed 13,200 foot peak near Silverton, Colorado when he fell 100 feet down a steep slope before coming to a stop. He was climbing with his wife, Jennifer, who witnessed the incident. He suffered a concussion, five broken ribs, a broken nose, collapsed right lung, and various bruising and lacerations. In the middle of the night, the Silverton Medical Rescue Group worked to locate Gerry and a Flight for Life helicopter attempted to land, but was unable to identify a safe landing location.

After spending the night on the mountain with the search and rescue team, Gerry was then hoisted into a Black Hawk helicopter operated by the Colorado National Guard and taken to a lower elevation. From there, a Flight for Life helicopter transferred him to a hospital in Durango, Colorado.

== Education ==
Gerry graduated from the University of Washington with a degree in math in 1964.

== Awards and recognition ==
- Gerry was featured in an article published in the August 2000 edition of Rock & Ice magazine.
- On September 9, 2005, Gerry was presented with the Francis P. Farquhar Mountaineering Award by the Sierra Club.
- In 2006, Gerry received the Colorado Mountain Club's Ellingwood Golden Ice Axe Award.

== Publications ==
- Roach, Gerry (1987). Flatiron Classics: A Guide to Easy Climbs and Trails in Boulder's Flatirons. Fulcrum Publishing. ISBN 9781555910174.
- Roach, Gerry (1992). Colorado's Indian Peaks Wilderness: Classic Hikes and Climbs. Fulcrum Publishing. ISBN 9781555910419.
- Roach, Gerry (2004). Transcendent Summits: One Climber's Route to Self-Discovery. Fulcrum Publishing. ISBN 9781555914714.
- Roach, Gerry (2008). Flatiron Classics: Easy Rock Climbs Above Boulder. Colorado Mountain Club. ISBN 9780979966323.
- Roach, Gerry (2012). Beyond the Seven Summits: Pre Everest. Summit Sight. ISBN 9781478360599.
- Roach, Gerry (2012). Beyond the Seven Summits: After Everest. Summit Sight. ISBN 9781480007581.
- Roach, Gerry (2012). Why Everest: A Short History of the Pioneers. CreateSpace Independent Publishing Platform. ISBN 9781477429709.
- Roach, Gerry (2022). Colorado's Fourteeners: From Hikes to Climbs (Fourth ed.). Chicago Review Press. ISBN 9781641607759.
