= Bear Peak (Boulder County, Colorado) =

Mountain in Colorado, United States of America

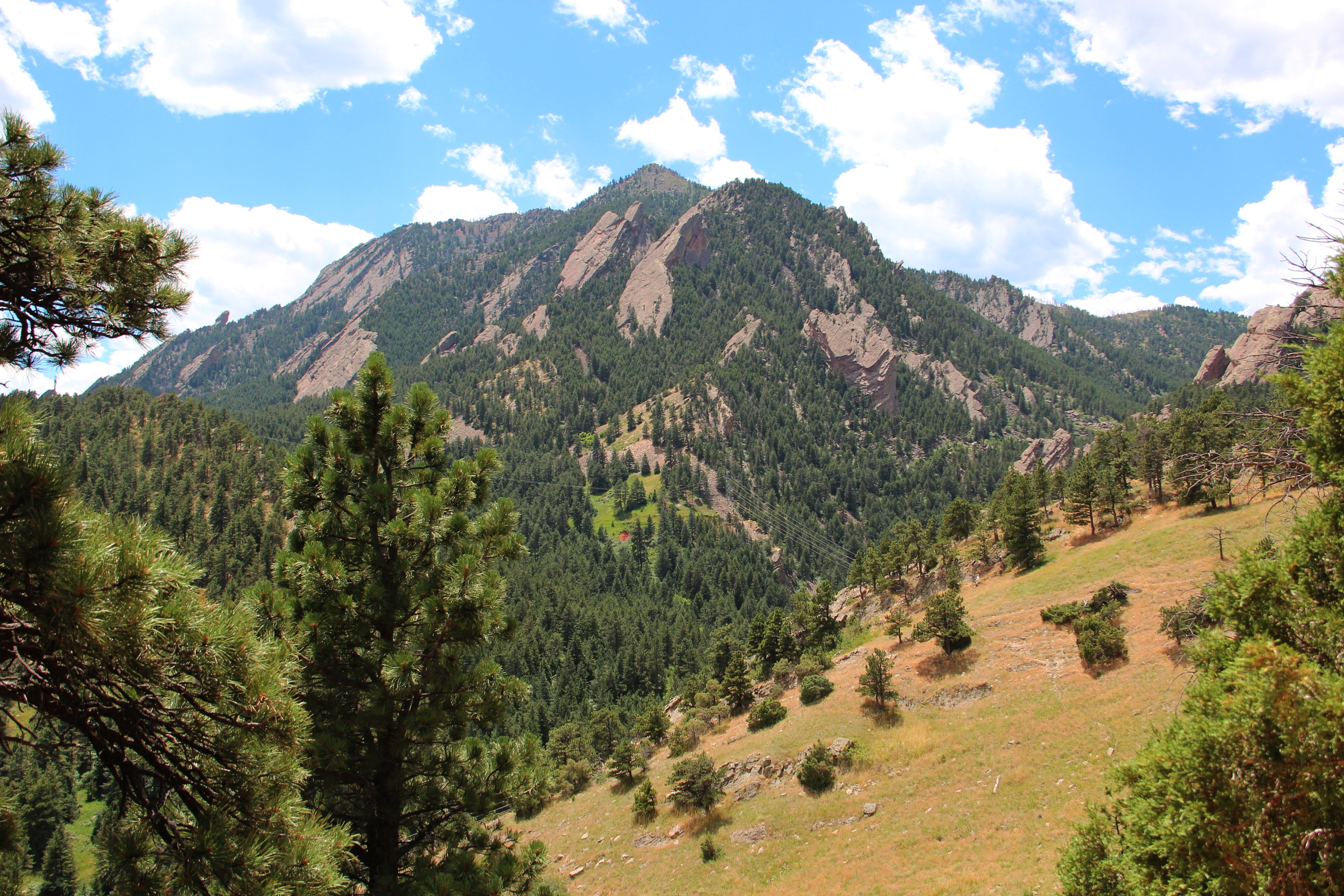
- Bear Peak viewed from the NCAR Trail

Highest point
- Elevation: 8,459 ft (2,578 m)
- Prominence: 281 ft (86 m)
- Isolation: 0.50 mi (0.80 km)
- Coordinates: 39°57′37″N 105°17′43″W

Geography
- Location within Colorado
- Location: Boulder County, Colorado, U.S.
- Parent range: Front Range
- Topo map(s): USGS 7.5' topographic map Eldorado Springs, Colorado

Climbing
- Easiest route: hike

Bear Peak is a mountain summit in the Front Range of the Rocky Mountains of North America. The 8,459-foot (2,578 m) peak is located in Boulder Mountain Park, 5.2 miles (8.3 km) south-southwest (bearing 206°) of downtown Boulder in Boulder County, Colorado, United States.

== Mountain ==
Bear Peak is generally considered to be at the southern end of Boulder's Flatirons range, rock formations on the westernmost part of the city. The hike to the top of Bear Peak is a popular activity and is considered the most strenuous hike in the immediate Boulder area. True to its name, bear can sometimes be seen on the nearby trails. Two steep trails lead up to the peak, Shadow Canyon and Fern Canyon. Bear Peak is connected to South Boulder Peak on the south side by a saddle, located at the top of Shadow Canyon. The views from the top of Bear Peak are excellent with Boulder, Denver, the Indian Peaks mountain range, and Rocky Mountain National Park peaks all visible. It's not safe to hike to the peak or be near the summit during thunderstorms and fatalities have occurred in recent years. In addition to hiking, Bear Peak has at least three rock climbing formations directly adjacent — The Slab, The Goose, and Seal Rock. These formations have rock climbs ranging from 5.2 (easy) to 5.13 (quite difficult).

On June 26, 2012, the Flagstaff Fire erupted and burned an upper section of Bear Peak. Some homes in south Boulder were evacuated but no structures were lost in the blaze. The Flagstaff Fire was part of a busy 2012 fire season for Colorado.

== See also ==
- List of Colorado mountain ranges
- List of Colorado mountain summits
  - List of Colorado fourteeners
  - List of Colorado 4000 meter prominent summits
  - List of the most prominent summits of Colorado
- List of Colorado county high points
