= Cheesman Dam =

Dam in Colorado, United States

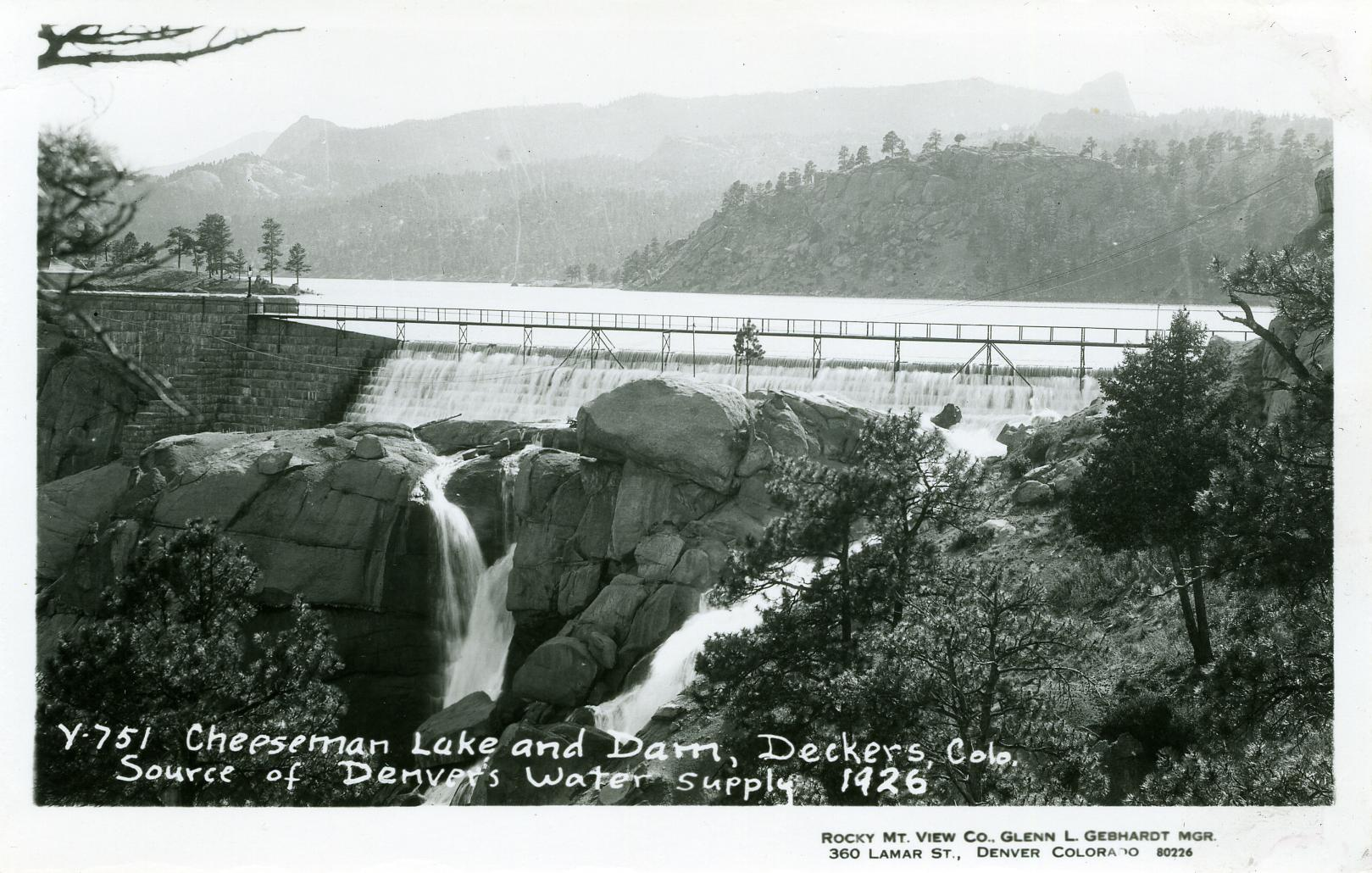
- The dam in 1926

- Location within Colorado
- Interactive map of Cheesman Dam
- Location: Jefferson County, Colorado, USA
- Coordinates: 39°12′27.03″N 105°16′20.05″W
- Purpose: Water supply
- Opening date: 1905
- Operator: Denver Water

Dam and spillways
- Type of dam: Masonry, gravity arch
- Impounds: South Platte River
- Height: 221 feet (67 m)
- Length: 735 feet (224 m)
- Width (crest): 18 feet (5.5 m)
- Spillway type: Concrete crest weir
- Spillway capacity: 22,370 cu ft/s (633 m^{3}/s)

Reservoir
- Total capacity: 79,064 acre-feet (0.097524 km^{3})
- Surface area: 877 acres (355 ha)

Cheesman Dam is a 211-foot-tall (64 m) masonry curved gravity dam on the South Platte River located in Colorado. It was the tallest of its type in the world when completed in 1905. The primary purpose of the dam is water supply and it was named for Colorado businessman, Walter Cheesman. In 1973 it was designated a Historic Civil Engineering Landmark. Denver Water purchased the reservoir and related facilities in 1918.

== History ==
The location for the new dam was explored by chief engineer C.P. Allen on during a fishing trip on September 23, 1893. The first stage was to build a diversion tunnel in 1898, which after the completion of the dam would become the outlet. The plans called for an embankment dam faced with concrete and metal some 200 feet tall, which began to rise in 1899. This was not to be as after one year of work, on the morning of May 3, 1900, the river began to rise after a heavy rainstorm added to the already high spring river flow. The water filled the outlet pipe and then overtopped the diversion heading for the construction site. The company sent out men to warn those downstream that the still incomplete structure could not last for long. Residents of Littleton, Colorado were warned at 10:00 AM that the flood would arrive in three hours. The dam was overtopped and swept away leaving only a remnant of the masonry wall.

After this disaster the Denver Union Water Company planned a new structure in the same location. The new design would be a hybrid arch-gravity dam constructed of masonry. The blocks of granite for the dam were quarried from two locations near the site, one above and one below the location of the dam. They were transported by short rail lines and even by barge on the lake growing behind the new structure. Construction was renewed and lasted until 1905. At completion the dam was the tallest in the world, a title it would hold for seven years, until 1912. Water flowed over the new dam's spillway for the first time on May 9, 1905.

== See also ==
- The Island (Cheesman Reservoir)

== Bibliography ==
- Dams of the United States - Pictorial display of Landmark Dams. Denver, Colorado: US Society on Dams. 2013.
