= James Stetson Metcalfe =

American drama critic (1858–1927)

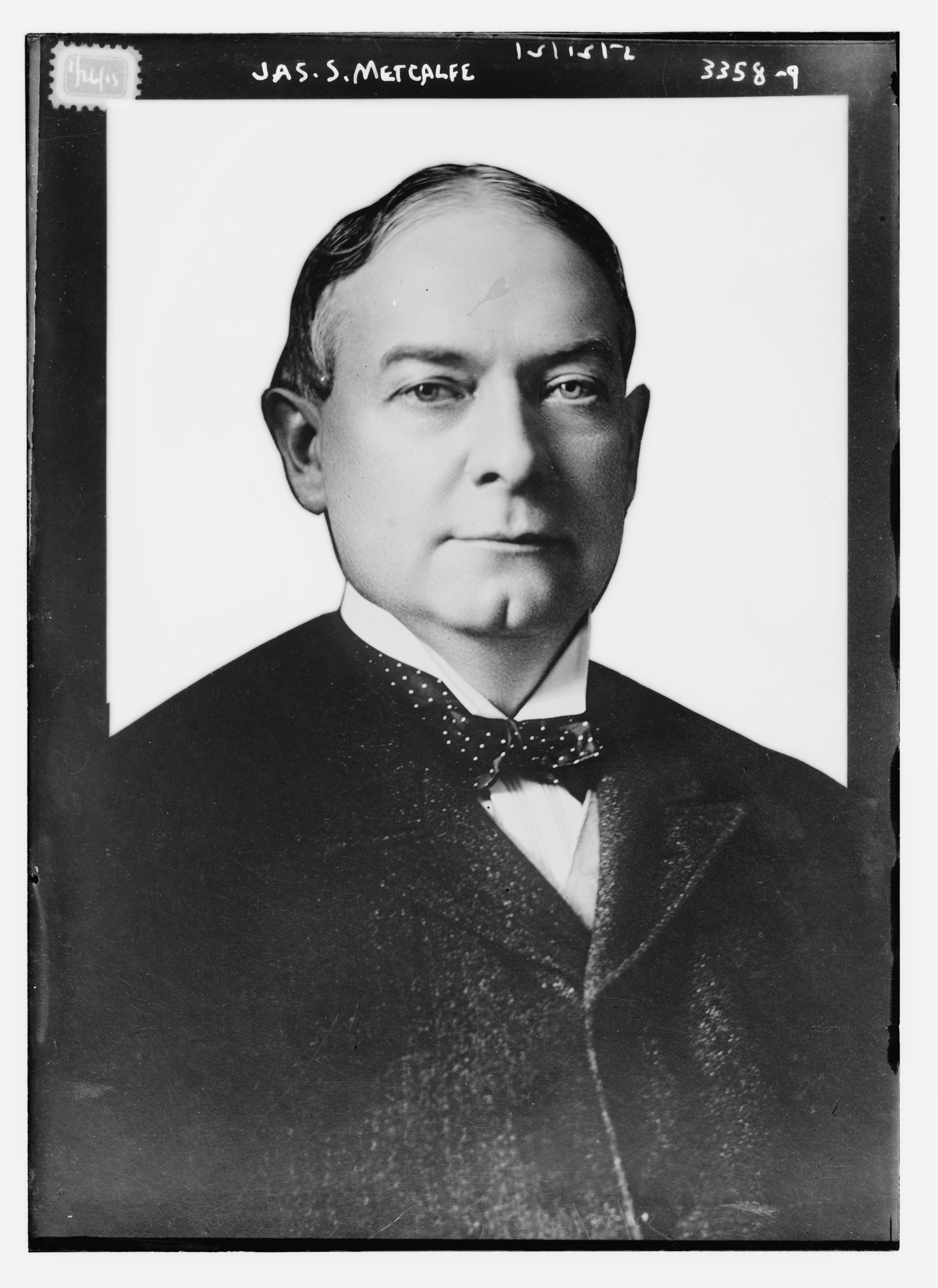
- Jas. S. Metcalfe, 1915
- Born: June 27, 1858; Buffalo, New York
- Died: May 26, 1927 (aged 68); New York City, New York
- Education: Phillips-Andover Academy
- Alma mater: Yale University
- Spouses: Edith Williams (m. 1896; died 1902) Elizabeth Tyree (m. 1904)
- Parent(s): James Harvey Metcalfe; Erzelia Frances Stetson
- Relatives: Frances Metcalfe Wolcott (sister)
- Awards: Legion of Honour

James Stetson Metcalfe (June 27, 1858 – May 26, 1927) was an American drama critic who wrote for Life Magazine and The Wall Street Journal.

== Early life ==
Metcalfe was born on June 27, 1858, in Buffalo, New York. He was a son of James Harvey Metcalfe (1822–1879) and Erzelia Frances (née Stetson) Metcalfe (1832–1913). Among his siblings were Frances Metcalfe Wolcott (an author who married U.S. Representative Lyman K. Bass and U.S. Senator Edward O. Wolcott), George Stetson Metcalfe, and Francis Tyler Metcalfe. His father came to Buffalo from Bath, New York, in 1855 and established the family fortune by founding the First National Bank of Buffalo and the Buffalo, New York and Philadelphia Railroad. He was also an early park commissioner and helped implement Frederick Law Olmsted's plan for the city's park system.

His paternal great-grandfather was killed in the Tory army at the Battle of Bunker Hill and his grandfather, Thomas Metcalfe, was "taken by his mother to Virginia, where later he freed his Virginia-born slaves and trekked to Central New York".

He attended Phillips-Andover Academy and Yale University, where he received both his B.A. degree in 1879 and his M.A. degree in 1891.

== Career ==
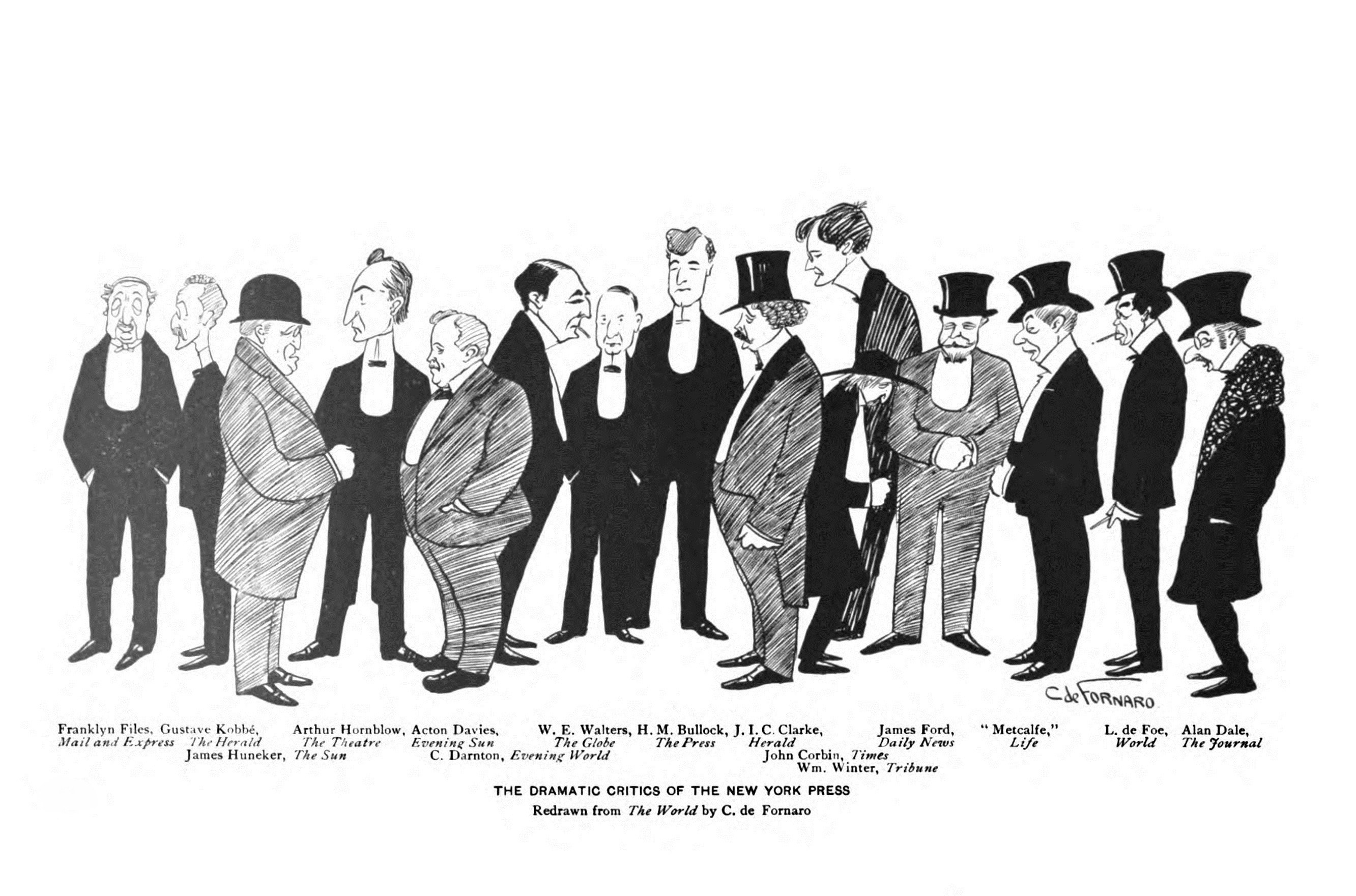
The Dramatic Critics of the New York Press, March 1904

In 1883 and 1884, Metcalfe was the editor and publisher of The Modern Age and from 1885 to 1886, he was an editorial writer for The Buffalo Express. Afterwards, he was the editor of The People's Pictorial Express for one year and then the manager of the American Newspaper Publishers Association for three years. In 1889, he became the drama critic for Life, the popular weekly magazine published in New York. From 1890 to 1895, he was also the literary editor of Life and for one year, 1919, art editor. He served as the magazine's drama critic for thirty-one years until 1920, writing reviews of plays. While at Life, he was known for his sharp wit and libel lawsuits from those he criticized. After Life, he wrote for Judge magazine, serving as the art and dramatic editor for two years before becoming the dramatic editor of The Wall Street Journal in 1923.

Metcalfe also authored several books including Mythology for Moderns (1900), The American Slave (1900), Another Three Weeks (1908), The Diary of a District Messenger (1909) and Jane Street (1921). In 1903, he ran, unsuccessfully, as a Democratic candidate for the 19th District in the New York State Assembly in 1903.

In 1915, he established the Metcalfe Prize at Yale for the best essay written on the theatre. In 1919, was made a Knight of the French Legion of Honour for his work on behalf of French war orphans.

== Personal life ==
Metcalfe was twice married. His first marriage was in 1896 to Edith Williams (1865–1902), a daughter of Homer M. Williams of Batavia, New York. After her death in 1902, he married actress Elizabeth Tyree (1864–1952) at the Marble Collegiate Church in 1904. Elizabeth was "from an old Virginia family and went on stage after several season in Washington society."

Metcalfe died on May 26, 1927, at his home at 2 West 67th Street in New York City. After a funeral service in Buffalo, he was buried at Forest Lawn Cemetery there. His widow, who inherited his estate and was a founder of the Bedford Hills Community House, died at their home in 1952.
