= Johann Friedrich Röhr =

German theologian

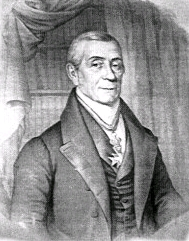
Johann Friedrich Röhr

Johann Friedrich Röhr (30 July 1777 in Roßbach – 15 June 1848 in Weimar) was a German theologian; regarded as a main representative of theological rationalism.

From 1796 he studied theology at the University of Leipzig, and following completion of studies, served as a vespers preacher at the University Church in Leipzig. In 1802 he became an assistant pastor in Pforta, then from 1804 to 1820 was a pastor in Ostrau bei Zeitz. Afterwards, he served as head pastor and general superintendent in Weimar. On 26 March 1832, he delivered the eulogy at the funeral of Johann Wolfgang von Goethe.

== Selected works ==
- Briefe über der Rationalismus, 1813 – Letters on rationalism.
- Kritische Prediger-Bibliothek, (editor from 1835 to 1842; volumes 16–23) – Critical preacher's library.
- Palästina; oder, Historisch-geographische Beschreibung des jüdischen Landes zur Zeit Jesu, 1821 – Palestine, or historical-geographical description of Judea at the time of Jesus.
- Predigten in der Hof- und Stadt-Kirche zu Weimar über die gewöhnlichen Sonn- und Festtags-Evangelien gehalten (2 volumes, 1822–23) – Sermons in the court and city church at Weimar, etc.
- Religionsbekenntnisse zweier Vernunftfreunde nämlich eines protestantischen und eines katholischen Theologen, 1835 – Religion denominations of two rational friends, namely a Protestant and a Catholic theologian.
- Grund- und Glaubens-Sätze der evangelisch-protestantischen Kirche, 1843 – Basic and faith propositions of the Evangelical Protestant church.
- Röhr's Historico-geographical account of Palestine. Researches in Palestine, 1843 by Eli Smith, Samuel Wolcott, David Esdaile, edited by Edward Robinson.

In the 1830s Karl von Hase struck a blow against theological rationalism in an "anti-Röhr" polemic that was included in Hase's Theologische Streitschriften als Beilage zu dessen Hutterus Redivivus und Leben Jesu (3 volumes, 1834–37).
