= Thomas M. Bowen =

American judge (1835–1906)

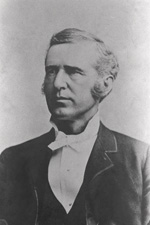

United States Senator from Colorado
- In office March 4, 1883 – March 3, 1889
- Preceded by: Horace Austin Warner Tabor
- Succeeded by: Edward Oliver Wolcott

4th Governor of Idaho Territory
- In office 1871 – 1871 (one week)
- Preceded by: David W. Ballard
- Succeeded by: Thomas W. Bennett

Personal details
- Born: October 26, 1835 Burlington, Michigan Territory (now Iowa)
- Died: December 30, 1906 (aged 71) Pueblo, Colorado
- Resting place: Roselawn Cemetery in Pueblo, Colorado
- Party: Republican
- Other political affiliations: Democratic
- Profession: Attorney

Military service
- Branch/service: United States Army; Union Army
- Years of service: 1861–1865
- Rank: Colonel; Brevet Brigadier General
- Battles/wars: American Civil War

Thomas Mead Bowen (October 26, 1835 – December 30, 1906) was a state legislator in Iowa and Colorado, a Union Army officer during the American Civil War, a justice of the Arkansas Supreme Court, briefly the governor of Idaho Territory, an elected judge in Colorado and a United States senator from Colorado.

== Biography ==
Bowen was born near the present site of Burlington, Iowa, in what was then Michigan Territory, on October 26, 1835. He attended the public schools and the academy at Mount Pleasant, Iowa. He studied law and was admitted to the bar in 1853 and began practicing law. He was married to Margaretta T. Bowen.

== Career ==
Bowen moved to Wayne County, Iowa, in 1856 and was a Democratic member of the Iowa House of Representatives that year. In 1858, he moved to Kansas.

During the American Civil War, Bowen served in the Union Army. On June 11, 1861, he was appointed captain of the 1st Nebraska Infantry Regiment, later redesignated 1st Nebraska Cavalry Regiment. He resigned from the volunteers on February 5, 1862. He rejoined the Union Army on July 11, 1862, as first lieutenant of the 9th Regiment Kansas Volunteer Cavalry and was promoted to captain, July 30, 1862. Bowen was appointed colonel of the 13th Regiment Kansas Volunteer Infantry, September 20, 1862. Bowen was temporary commander of brigades in the Department of the Missouri and the Department of Arkansas from October 1862 to March 21, 1864. He commanded Brigade 1, Division 1, VII Corps (Union Army) in the Department of Arkansas from March 22, 1865, to June 24, 1865. Bowen was appointed a brevet brigadier general, to rank from March 13, 1865. He was discharged from the volunteers on June 28, 1865.

After the war, Bowen found himself in Arkansas and decided to stay there. He was a member and president of the constitutional convention of Arkansas in 1866; he was also a Reconstruction era justice of the Arkansas Supreme Court from 1867 to 1871.

Bowen, who made a large fortune in business, was appointed governor of Idaho Territory by U.S. President Ulysses S. Grant on April 19, 1871, but resigned on September 27, 1871, and returned to Arkansas. He moved to Colorado Territory in 1873 and resumed the practice of law. Bowen was elected judge of the Fourth Judicial District Court in Colorado, a position which he held from 1876 until 1880, when he suddenly resigned.

Bowen was a member of the Colorado House of Representatives in 1882 and resigned soon thereafter upon his election as a Republican to the United States Senate. He served in that body from March 4, 1883, to March 3, 1889. While in the Senate, he was chairman of the Committee on Mining (in the Forty-eighth Congress), Committee on Enrolled Bills (Forty-ninth and Fiftieth Congresses).

== Death ==
Bowen engaged in mining in Colorado and resided in Pueblo, where he died on December 30, 1906, at the age of seventy-one. He is interred at Roselawn Cemetery in Pueblo.

== See also ==
- List of American Civil War brevet generals (Union)

U.S. Senate
Preceded by Horace A. W. Tabor	U.S. senator (Class 2) from Colorado; 1883–1889; Served alongside: Nathaniel P. Hill, Henry M. Teller	Succeeded by Edward O. Wolcott
