= Mount Toll =

Mountain in the state of Colorado

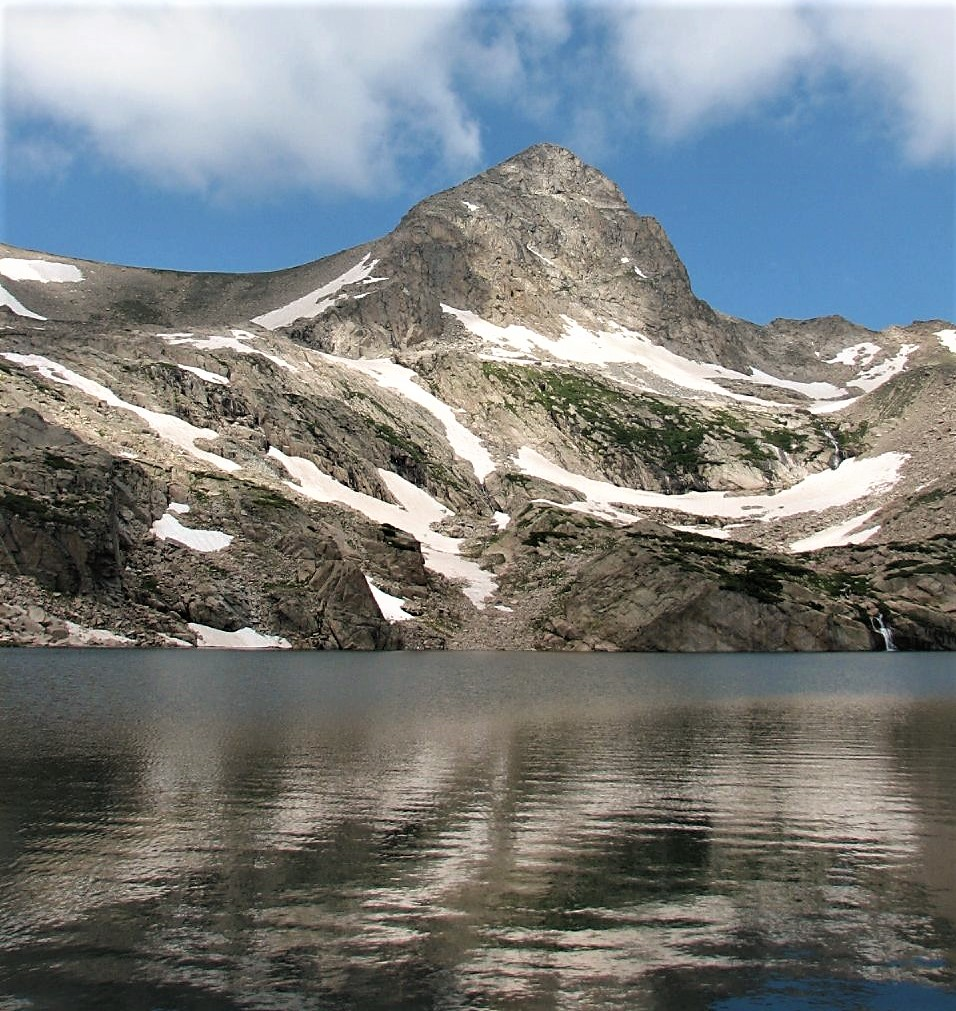
- East aspect, from Blue Lake

Highest point
- Elevation: 12,979 ft (3,956 m)
- Prominence: 438 ft (134 m)
- Parent peak: Paiute Peak (13,088 ft)
- Isolation: 0.64 mi (1.03 km)
- Coordinates: 40°05′18″N 105°38′02″W

Naming
- Etymology: Roger W. Toll

Geography
- Location within Colorado Location within the United States
- Country: United States
- State: Colorado
- County: Boulder / Grand
- Protected area: Indian Peaks Wilderness
- Parent range: Rocky Mountains; Front Range
- Topo map: USGS Monarch Lake

Geology
- Rock age: Mesoproterozoic
- Rock type: Granite

Climbing
- Easiest route: South slope class 2

Mount Toll is a 12,979-foot (3,956 m) mountain summit on the boundary shared by Boulder County and Grand County, in Colorado, United States.

== Description ==
Mount Toll is set on the Continental Divide in the Front Range which is a subrange of the Rocky Mountains. The mountain is located 21 miles (34 km) west-northwest of Boulder in the Indian Peaks Wilderness, on land managed by Arapaho National Forest and Roosevelt National Forest. It is the seventh-highest summit in the wilderness and 16th-highest in Boulder County. Precipitation runoff from the mountain's east slope drains into Blue Lake thence South St. Vrain Creek, whereas the west slope drains to Monarch Lake via Cascade Creek, thence Lake Granby. Topographic relief is significant as the summit rises 2,100 feet (640 m) above Pawnee Lake in 0.6 mile (1 km) and 1,660 feet (506 m) above Blue Lake in 0.65 mile.

== Etymology ==
The landform's toponym was officially adopted on November 19, 1940, by the United States Board on Geographic Names to honor Roger Wolcott Toll (1883–1936), American mountaineer, superintendent of nearby Rocky Mountain National Park (1921–1929), and author of The Mountain Peaks of Colorado. He is also the namesake of Toll Mountain in Texas.

== Climate ==
According to the Köppen climate classification system, the mountain is located in an alpine subarctic climate zone with cold, snowy winters, and cool to warm summers. Due to its altitude, it receives precipitation all year, as snow in winter and as thunderstorms in summer, with a dry period in late spring.

== Climbing ==
Established climbing routes on Mount Toll:

- South slopes – class 2
- Southeast face – class 2
- East chimney – class 4
- Northeast ramp – class 5.0–5.2
- Northeast face – class 5.6
- North ridge – class 5.6

== Gallery ==
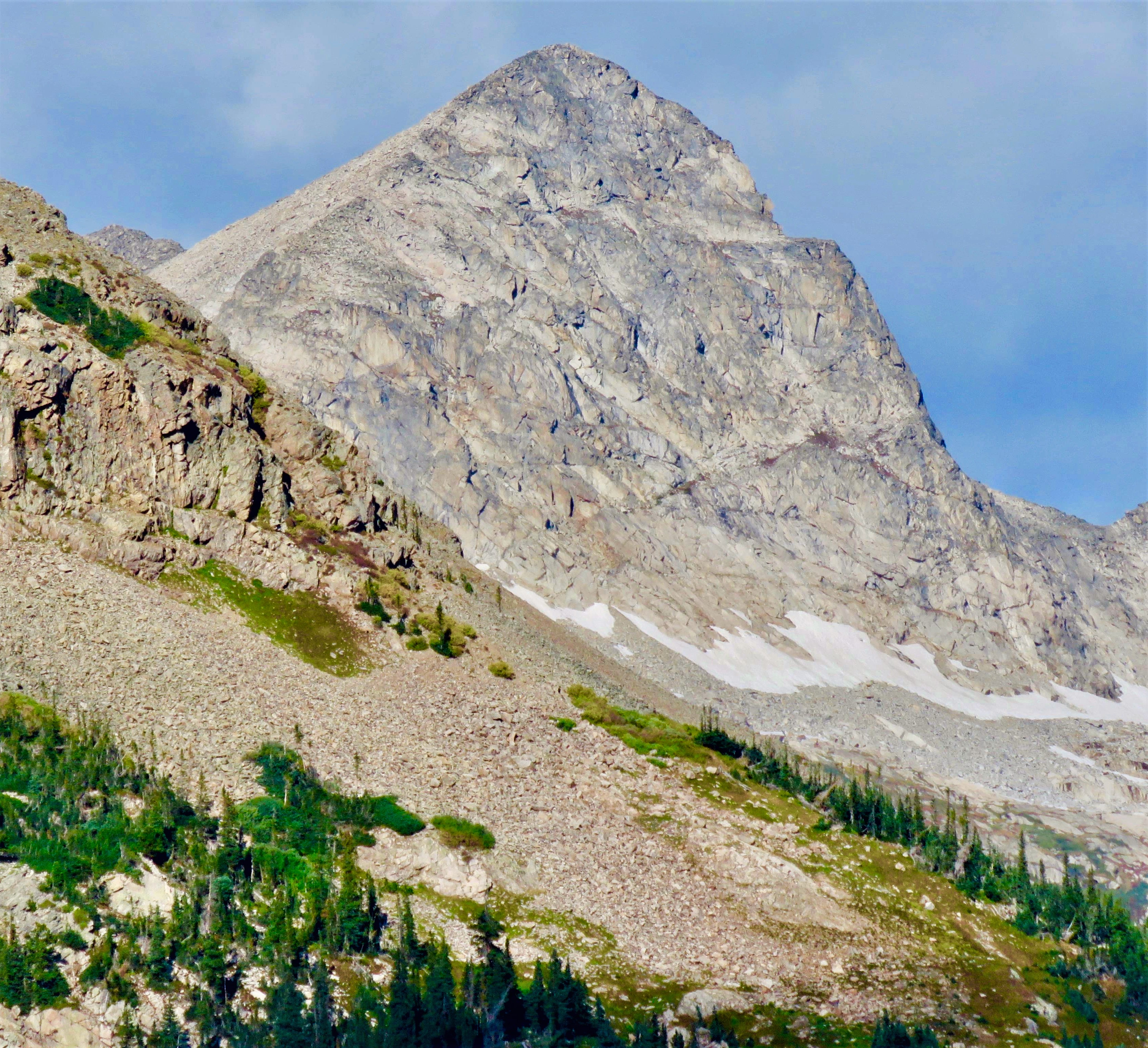

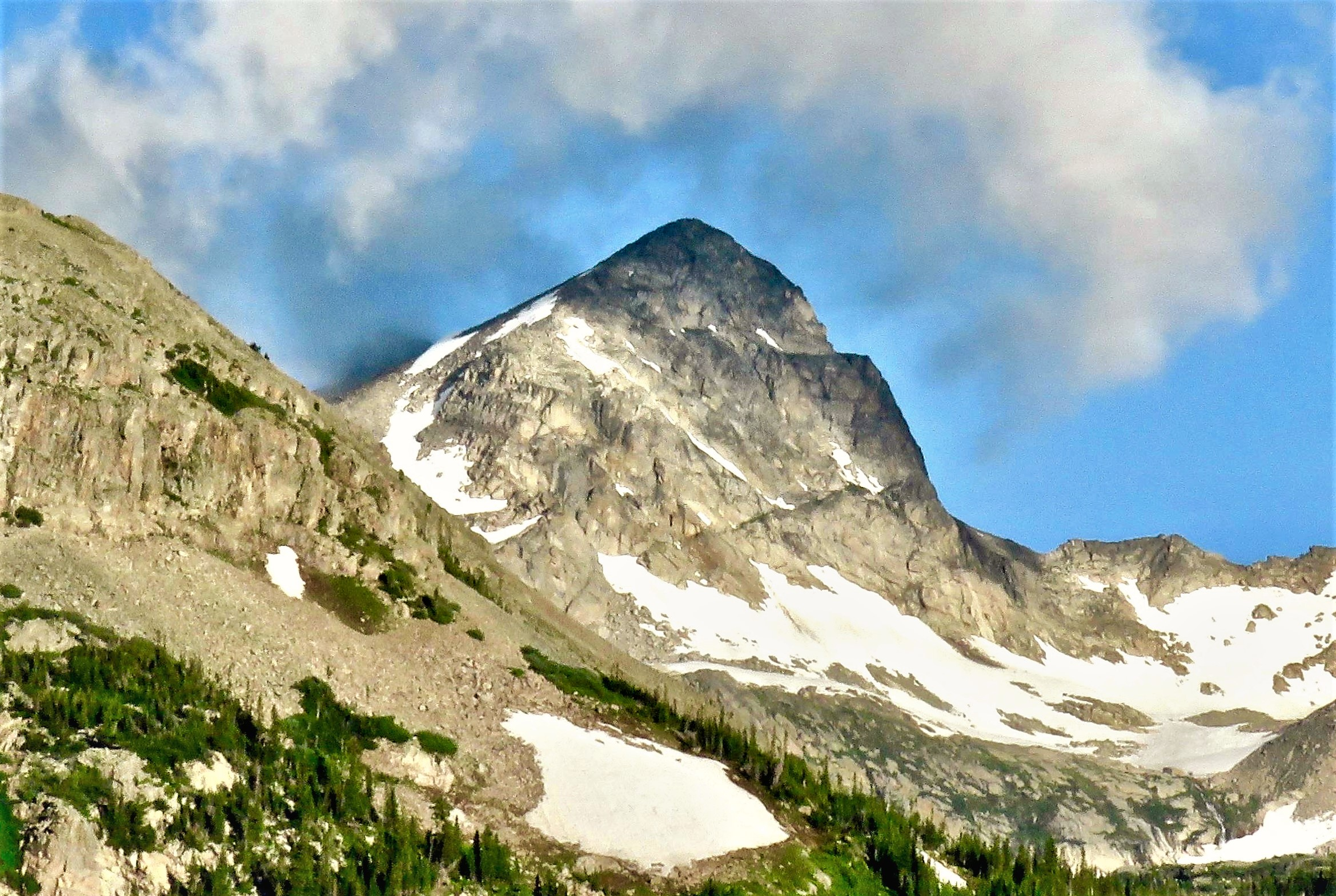

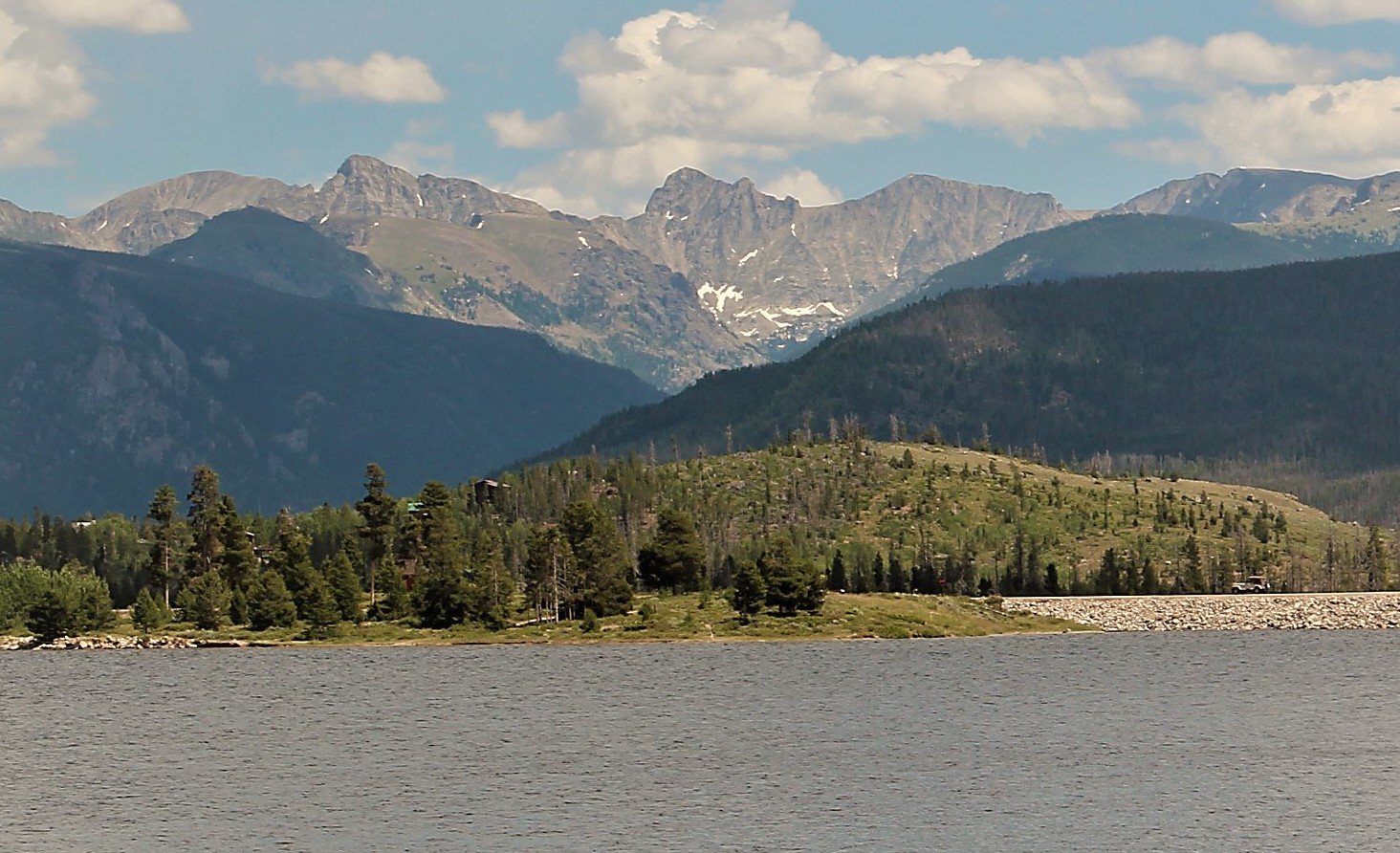
West aspect of Mt. Toll centered, viewed from Lake Granby

== See also ==
- Mountains of Boulder County, Colorado
