= Agnes Vaille Shelter =

- U.S. National Register of Historic Places
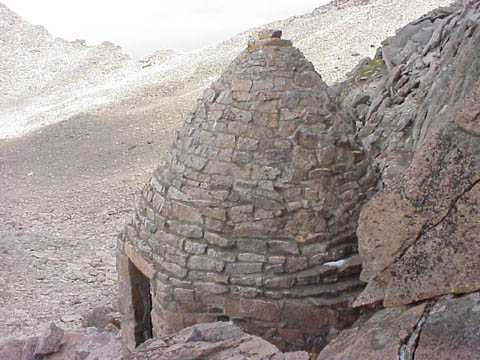

- Location within Colorado Location within the United States
- Nearest city: Estes Park, Colorado
- Coordinates: 40°15′38″N 105°37′13″W
- Area: Less than one acre
- Built: 1927 and 1935
- Built by: National Park Service
- Architectural style: NPS Rustic
- MPS: Rocky Mountain National Park MRA
- NRHP reference No.: 92001669
- Added to NRHP: December 24, 1992

The Agnes Vaille Shelter is a beehive-shaped stone shelter along E. Longs Peak Trail near the summit of Longs Peak in Rocky Mountain National Park, Colorado, USA. The first shelter was built in 1927 by the National Park Service after a number of climbers died ascending Longs Peak. The shelter was named for Agnes Vaille, who died while descending from the first winter ascent of the east face of Longs Peak on January 12, 1925. Herbert Sortland also died of exposure during an attempt to rescue Vaille. Vaille's family rebuilt the shelter in 1935.

== Agnes Vaille ==
Agnes Wolcott Vaille was born in 1890 and graduated from Smith College. She came from a prominent Denver family; her father was president of the first telephone company in Denver. During World War I, Vaille volunteered to work overseas for the Red Cross. After the war, Vaille was appointed secretary of the Denver Chamber of Commerce.

Vaille was a member of the Colorado Mountain Club, served as Outing Chairman and was an early member of the '14,000 Footers Club'. In 1923, she made a solo winter ascent, the first known, of James Peak. Mountaineer Carl Blaurock called Vaille "a strong, husky woman, just crazy about climbing".

== Vaille's death on Longs Peak ==
Vaille met Walter Kiener in the Colorado Mountain Club; they decided to be the first climbers to make a winter ascent of the east face of Longs Peak. Their first three attempts were unsuccessful. The fourth attempt began on the morning of January 11, 1925. On January 12, 1925, they reached the peak at 4:00 a.m. Kiener noted that the temperature was −14 °F (−26 °C). On the way down from the summit, the temperature dropped further and the wind picked up. At 13,000 ft (4,000 m), Vaille slipped and fell 100–150 ft (30–46 m). She survived but was exhausted, and her hands and feet were frozen. Kiener went for help but when rescuers arrived, Vaille had died of hypothermia. One of the rescuers, Herbert Sortland, suffered a broken hip from a fall, and also died of hypothermia. His body was found in late February, a few hundred yards from Longs Peak Inn, making him the fourth recorded fatality on Longs Peak.

Vaille was buried in Fairmount Cemetery, Denver, Colorado.

The first stone shelter was built in 1927 under the direction of Roger Toll, Superintendent of Rocky Mountain National Park and Vaille's cousin. Recent scholarship asserts that the present shelter was built by Vaille's family in 1935 to replace the 1927 Park Service shelter. The shelter was designed in the spirit of the National Park Service rustic style to blend with the local landscape, located above 13,400 feet (4,100 m) elevation on the edge of an area known as the Boulder Field. The stone for the shelter came from this area. It consists of a single circular room with a conical ceiling formed by the walls and roof of the shelter, entered by a single door opening whose door has been removed. As a result, the interior may be partially filled with snow for much of summer. There are two glazed windows and one filled-in opening, and the floor is paved with stone.

A plaque mounted near the shelter reads,

Agnes Wolcott Vaille

This shelter commemorates
a Colorado mountaineer
conquered by winter after
scaling the precipice
January 12, 1925
and one who lost his life
in an effort to aid her
Herbert Sortland

The Agnes Vaille Shelter was listed on the National Register of Historic Places on December 24, 1992.

== Walter Kiener ==
Kiener was born in Bern, Switzerland, on 18 October 1894, the son of a sausage maker. He left school at 15 to help support his family. In his free time, Kiener became an expert mountaineer in the Alps. After serving his mandatory military service, he immigrated to the United States. Kiener arrived in Denver in 1923, took a job as a butcher, and joined the Colorado Mountain Club where he met Vaille.

Kiener suffered frostbite as a result of the Longs Peak expedition and lost several fingers, most of his toes, and part of a foot. Vaille's father, who was grateful for Kiener's rescue attempt, paid Kiener's medical bills. The accident left Kiener unable to continue his job as foreman of a Denver sausage factory. He was given the job of seasonal ranger, manning the fire lookout station on top of Twin Sisters, by Superintendent Toll. He worked there for five summers, then, with financial assistance from the Vaille family, he enrolled in biology at University of Nebraska, graduating in 1930. He earned his master's degree in 1931 and his Ph.D. in 1940. His doctoral thesis was titled, Sociological Studies of the Alpine Vegetation on Longs Peak.

Kiener taught at the University of Nebraska and served as chief biologist for the State of Nebraska Game, Forestation, and Parks Commission. He also founded the Nebraska Game Commission's Fisheries Research Department. He died of pancreatic cancer on August 24, 1959. Keiner's extensive collection of plant specimens, catalogs, field notes, reference books is housed at the University of Nebraska State Museum.
