= Lyman K. Bass =

American politician

Lyman Kidder Bass
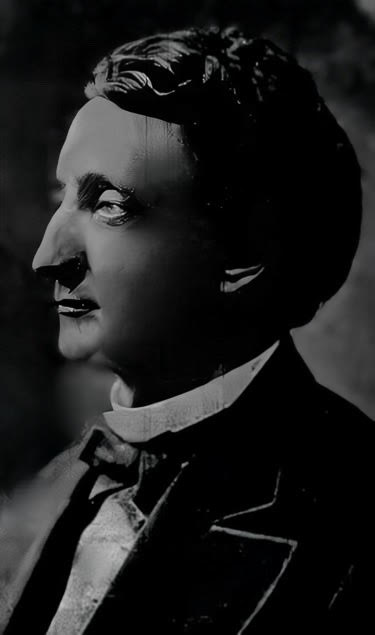
- From the May 19, 1889 edition of the Buffalo Courier Express

Member of the U.S. House of Representatives from New York
- In office March 4, 1873 – March 3, 1877
- Preceded by: Walter L. Sessions
- Succeeded by: Daniel N. Lockwood
- Constituency: 31st district (1873–75); 32nd district (1875–77)

16th District Attorney of Erie County, New York
- In office January 1, 1866 – December 31, 1871
- Preceded by: Cyrenius C. Torrance
- Succeeded by: Benjamin H. Williams

Personal details
- Born: November 13, 1836 Alden, New York, U.S.
- Died: May 11, 1889 (aged 52) New York, New York, U.S.
- Citizenship: United States
- Party: Republican
- Spouse: Frances Esther Metcalfe
- Children: Lyman Metcalfe Bass
- Education: Union College
- Profession: Attorney

Lyman Kidder Bass (November 13, 1836 – May 11, 1889) was an American lawyer, politician, U.S. Representative from New York, and the 16th District Attorney of Erie County, New York.

== Early life ==
Born in the town of Alden, New York, Bass attended the common schools and was graduated from Union College, Schenectady, New York, in 1856. He studied law, and was admitted to the bar in 1858. He commenced practice in Buffalo, New York.

== Career ==
In 1865, Bass ran against Grover Cleveland and was narrowly elected district attorney for Erie County. He served in this role from 1866 to 1871. He was renominated in 1871, but declined to accept. In 1870, he was an unsuccessful Republican candidate for election to the Forty-second Congress.

Bass was elected as a Republican U. S. Representative for the thirty-first district of New York to the Forty-third; and as Representative for the thirty-second district to the Forty-fourth Congresses. He served from March 4, 1873 to March 3, 1877. Because of ill health, he declined to be a candidate for renomination in 1876.

While in congress, Bass made a name for himself while serving on the House Committee on Expenditures in the War Department. During his time on the committee, it looked into spending by Secretary of War William Worth Belknap. In addition, Bass served on the Committee on Railways and Canals as well as the Joint Select Committee to Inquire into the Affairs of the District of Columbia. On June 22, 1874, President Ulysses S. Grant nominated Bass to be Assistant Secretary of the Treasury. He was confirmed by the Senate, but declined the position.

After moving to Colorado Springs, Colorado, in 1877, Bass was asked to be an associate counsel by the Denver & Rio Grande Railroad Co. Bass worked on a case against the Atchison, Topeka & Santa Fe Railway regarding the right of way through the Arkansas Canon on the route from Denver to Leadville. The case went to the U.S. Supreme Court and was won due to Bass' argument. He was then appointed chief counsel of the Denver & Rio Grande Railroad Co. and principal counsel of the Mexican National Railway.

== Personal life ==
He married Frances Esther Metcalfe, a daughter of James Harvey Metcalfe and Erzelia Frances (née Stetson) Metcalfe. She was also the sister of critic James Stetson Metcalfe. Before his early death, they were the parents of one child:

- Lyman Metcalfe Bass (1876–1955), who married Grace Holland, a daughter of Nelson Holland.

Bass died of consumption, in New York City's Buckingham Hotel on May 11, 1889. He is interred at Forest Lawn Cemetery, Buffalo, New York. After his death, his widow married U.S. Senator from Colorado, Edward O. Wolcott.

U.S. House of Representatives
Preceded by Walter L. Sessions	Member of the U.S. House of Representatives from New York's 31st congressional district March 4, 1873 – March 3, 1875	Succeeded by George G. Hoskins
Preceded by Walter L. Sessions	Member of the U.S. House of Representatives from New York's 32nd congressional district March 4, 1875 – March 3, 1877	Succeeded by Daniel N. Lockwood
