= The Island (Cheesman Reservoir) =

Small uninhabited island in Cheesman Lake, Colorado, United States

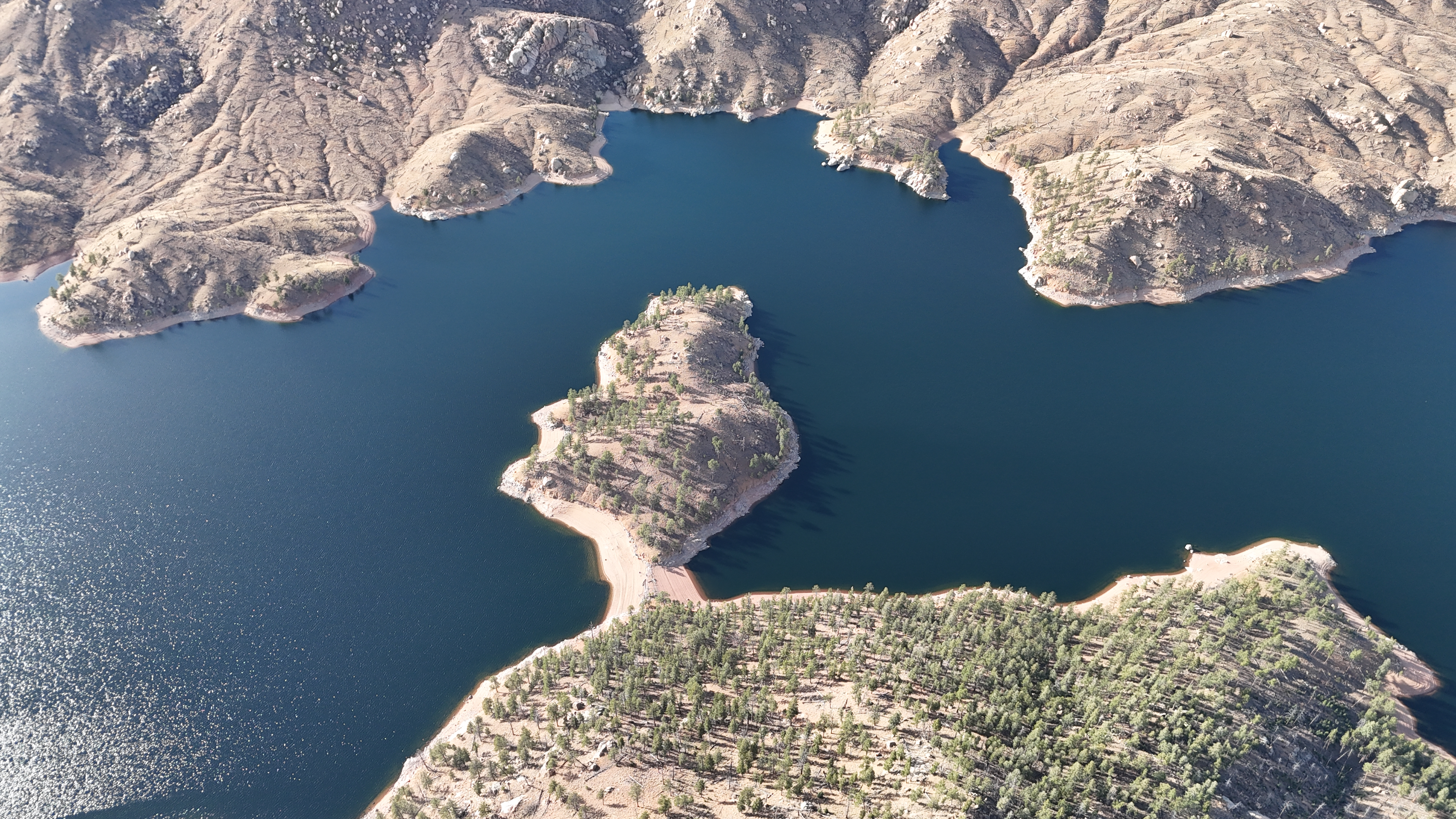
- Aerial view of The Island in Cheesman Reservoir

Geography
- Location: Pike National Forest, Colorado, United States
- Coordinates: 39°11′02″N 105°17′14″W
- Adjacent to: Cheesman Reservoir
- Area: 0.003 km^{2} (0.0012 sq mi)
- Length: 0.33 km (0.205 mi)
- Width: 0.20 km (0.124 mi)
- Highest elevation: 2,111 m (6926 ft)

Administration
- United States
- State: Colorado
- County: Douglas County

Demographics
- Population: 0

The Island is a small, uninhabited island in Cheesman Reservoir in Douglas County, Colorado, United States. It lies within the Pike National Forest between Denver and Colorado Springs.

== Geography ==
The Island is in the upper part of the reservoir. It is about 0.33 kilometres (0.21 mi) long and 0.20 kilometres (0.12 mi) wide, with a vegetated area of roughly 0.3 hectares (0.74 acres) (0.003 square kilometres (0.0012 sq mi)). The highest point reaches about 2,111 metres (6,926 ft) above sea level, while the reservoir surface is as high as about 2,087 metres (6,847 ft), giving the island ~24 metres (79 ft) of local relief. Some datasets report an elevation of 2,098 metres (6,883 ft) for the feature. At low water the island can be connected to the shore by a narrow bar.

== Geology ==
Like much of the surrounding region, the island is composed of coarse Pikes Peak granite. Vegetation consists of scattered shrubs and trees.

== Administration ==
The county line between Douglas County (east) and Jefferson County (west) runs along the middle of the reservoir; The Island lies off the eastern shore and is therefore part of Douglas County.

== Reservoir setting ==
Cheesman Reservoir trends roughly north–south for about 8 kilometres (5.0 mi) with a maximum width of about 600 metres (2,000 ft); the water surface can reach an elevation near 2,087 metres (6,847 ft). The reservoir lies within Pike National Forest, which covers about 4,478 square kilometres (1,729 sq mi) across Clear Creek, Teller, Park, Jefferson, El Paso and Douglas counties.

== Climate ==
Based on global datasets, the broader area has a cool, semi-arid climate by the Köppen climate classification. Mean annual temperature is ~9 °C (48 °F); the warmest month is July (~24 °C (75 °F)) and the coldest is February (~−6 °C (21 °F)). Mean annual precipitation is about 534 millimetres (21.0 in); September is the wettest month (~96 millimetres (3.8 in)) and November the driest (~19 millimetres (0.75 in)).

== 2002 Hayman Fire ==
In June 2002, the Hayman Fire burned roughly 550 square kilometres (210 sq mi) of the Pike National Forest (well over ten percent of the forest's area). It is unclear whether the fire affected The Island directly.

== See also ==
- List of islands of Colorado
