= South Boulder Peak =

Mountain in Colorado, United States of America

- Location within Colorado

Highest point
- Elevation: 8,541 ft (2,603 m)
- Prominence: 1,096 ft (334 m)
- Isolation: 3.2 mi (5.1 km)
- Coordinates: 39°57′13″N 105°17′58″W

Geography
- Location: Boulder County, Colorado, U.S.
- Parent range: Front Range
- Topo map(s): USGS 7.5' topographic map Eldorado Springs, Colorado

Climbing
- Easiest route: hike

South Boulder Peak is a mountain summit in the Front Range of the Rocky Mountains of North America. The 8,541-foot (2,603 m) peak is located in Boulder Mountain Park, 5.2 miles (8.3 km) south-southwest of downtown Boulder in Boulder County, Colorado, United States.

== Mountain ==
South Boulder Peak is located on the south end of the Boulder Mountain Park and is the tallest peak within the park. It is connected with Bear Peak via a saddle and Eldorado Canyon State Park is located on its southern flank. Most people who hike to the top of the mountain either use the Shadow Canyon Trail or cross the saddle from Bear Peak.

On June 26, 2012, the Flagstaff Fire erupted and burned an upper section of South Boulder Peak. Some homes in south Boulder were evacuated but no structures were lost in the blaze. The Flagstaff Fire was part of a busy 2012 fire season for Colorado.

== See also ==
- List of Colorado mountain ranges
- List of Colorado mountain summits
  - List of Colorado fourteeners
  - List of Colorado 4000 meter prominent summits
  - List of the most prominent summits of Colorado
- List of Colorado county high points
