= Walter Cheesman =

American businessman (1838–1907)

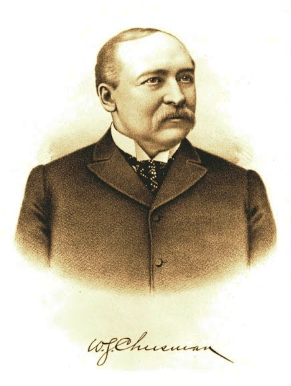
Walter Cheesman, American capitalist, involved in railroad, finance, real estate, and water industries.

Walter Cheesman (1838–1907) was an American businessman who was involved in railroad, finance, real estate, and water industries. After beginning his career in New York and Chicago, he lived in Denver, where Cheesman Dam, Cheesman Reservoir, and Cheesman Park are named for him.

== Early years ==
Walter Scott Cheesman was born at Hempstead Harbor, New York on June 27, 1838. He was a member of a prominent Long Island family and attended public high school. He received private tutoring before entering into family businesses, including banking and mercantile.

== Career ==
Cheesman moved to Chicago in 1854 to start a pharmacy business with William Henry and Edward Talbot Cheesman, his older brothers. His brothers came to Denver in 1859 and opened a pharmacy store, but they were not very successful, so Cheesman came to Denver in 1861 and took over the business. He added bottled water and liquor to the store's merchandise. The town's first drug store was located near the corner of Fifteenth and Blake. He operated the business until 1874, when he sold it.

In 1868 he, John Evans and David H. Moffat began work to build the Denver Pacific Railroad to Cheyenne, Wyoming. Cheesman was president of the railroad for several years. He planned for the construction of the Union Station, and he was active in the building of the Denver Boulder Valley Railroad and South Park Road. The railroad helped Denver become a major city. He also was a director of the Denver, Northern, and Pacific Railway Company.

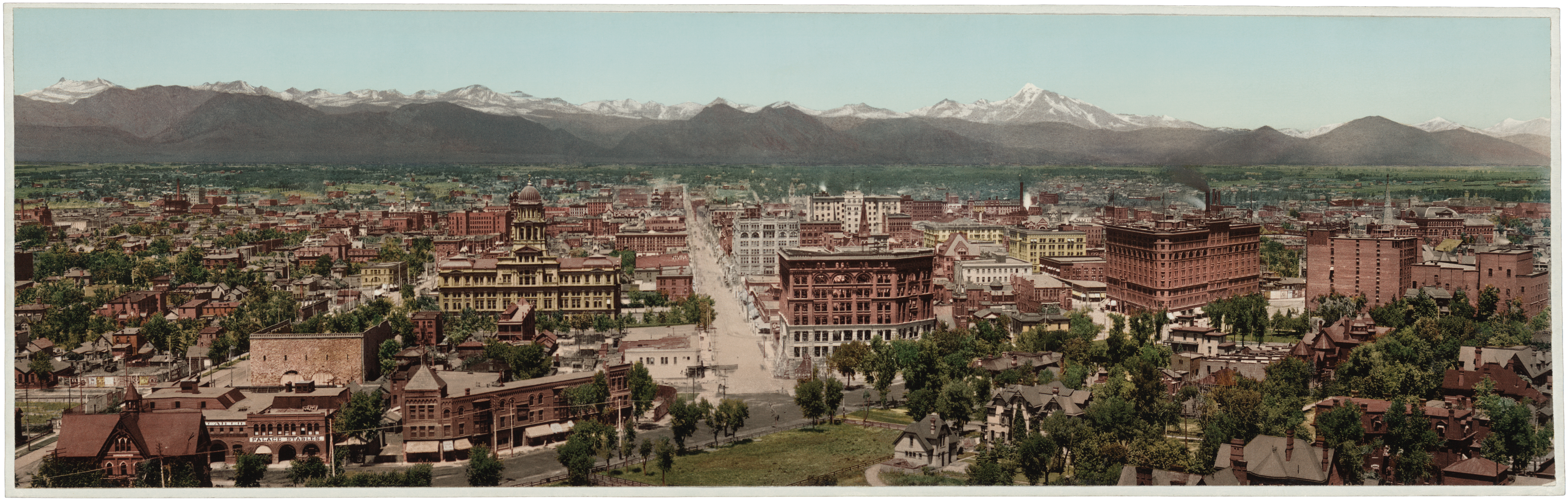
View from the top of the Colorado State Capitol, facing northwest looking down 16th St. The intersection of 16th and Broadway is in the foreground. The domed building on the left side is the County Courthouse, demolished in 1933.

Cheesman determined the location of the court house by purchasing the land and selling it to the city for an affordable price. The court house otherwise would have been located further from the center of the city. He was an organizer of the International Trust Company and served as a member of its executive committee for more than 15 years, and he was a member of the Denver Real Estate Exchange. He bought real estate throughout the years, established financial institutions, and helped develop mines.

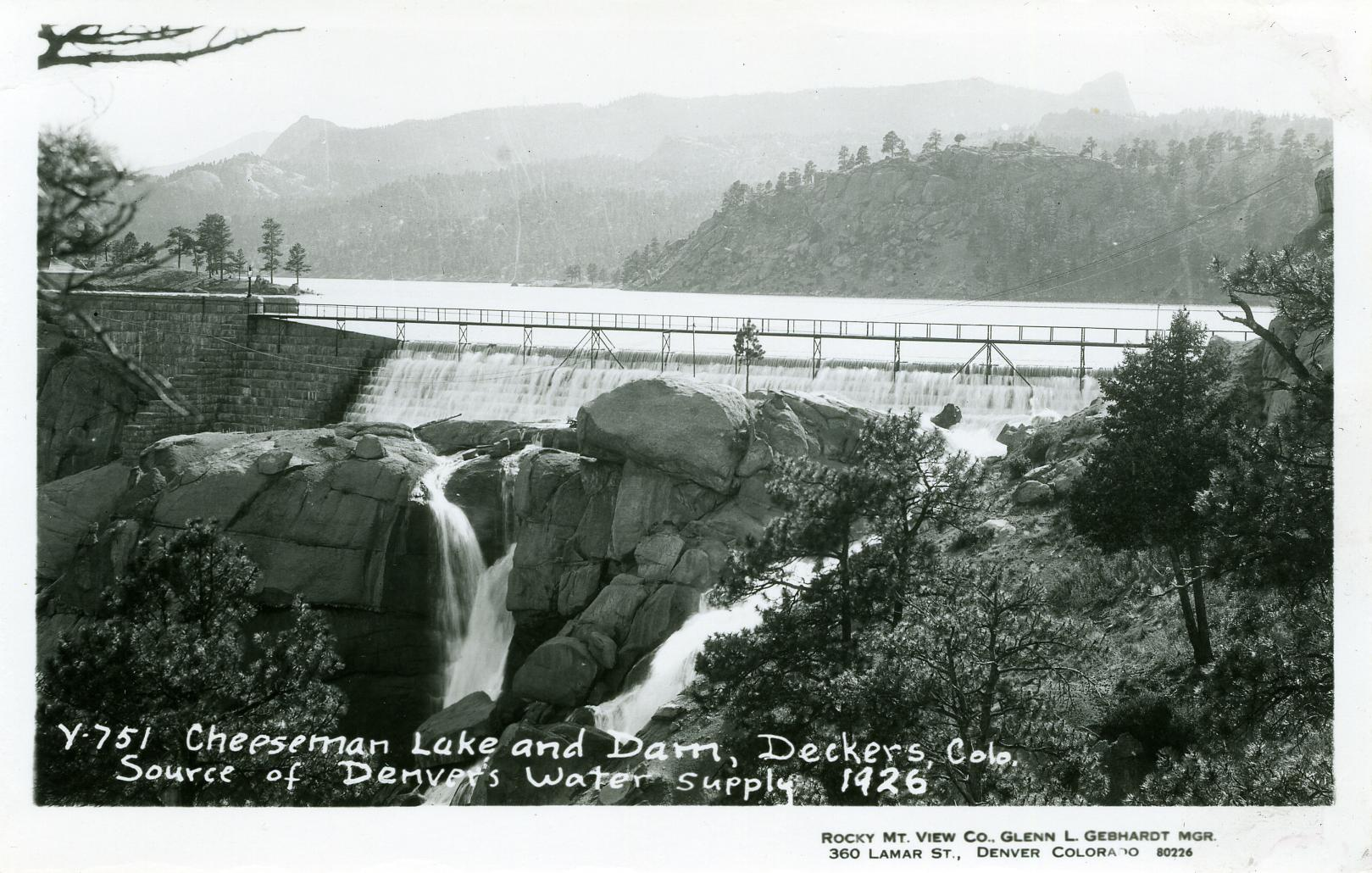
Cheesman Dam and Cheesman Reservoir

In 1870, he became a principal in a company to provide water to Denver and served on the board of directors. Two water plants were consolidated into the monopolistic Denver Union Water Company in 1894, and he, David Moffat, and Thomas Hayden owned the controlling stock. Cheesman became president of the company that grew to a $25 million organization. He built dams, reservoirs, and filtration and distribution systems. Cheesman Dam and Cheesman Reservoir are named for him.

== Personal life ==
He was president for years of the Colorado Humane Society, with the goal to end cruelty to children and animals. He was known to come to the aid of animals or children in need, even venturing out in bad weather after he had become a multi-millionaire to rescue and provide shelter to a horse that was staked out in an open field. Cheesman also supported the Juvenile Improvement Society, founded by Judge Ben Lindsey.

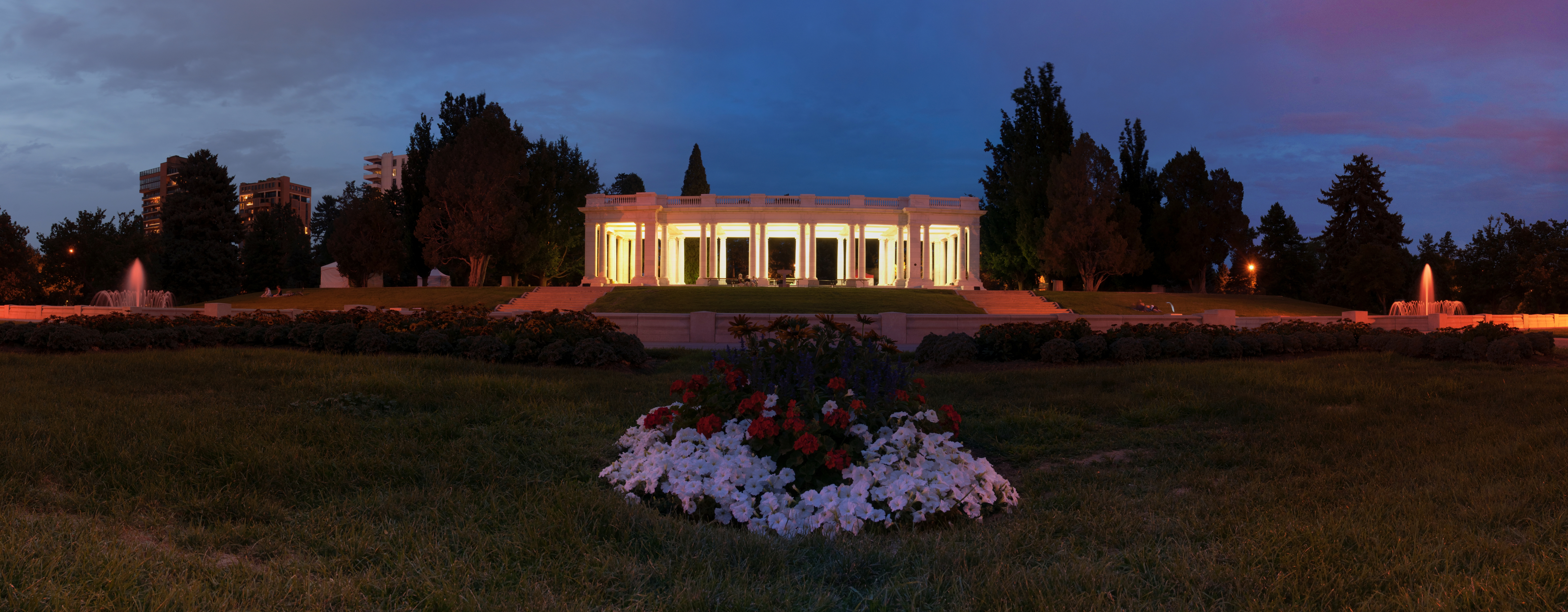
Cheesman Memorial, Cheesman Park, Denver

He lived in the Walter Dunning mansion at 1200 Pennsylvania Street in Denver for a short period of time before his death in 1907. The Cheesman Memorial was erected in his memory in Cheesman Park by his wife and daughter.

== See also ==
- Colorado Central Railroad, in which Cheesman had an interest
