= Anna Wolcott Vaile =

American educator (1868–1928)

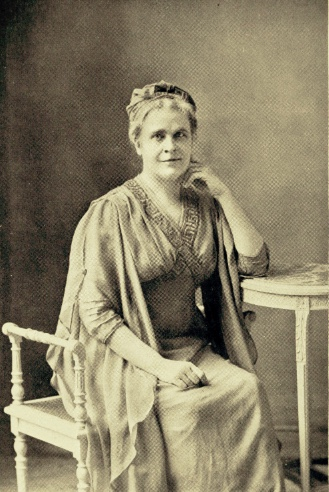
- Anna Wolcott Vaile, Representative Women of Colorado, 1914
- Born: May 25, 1868; Providence, Rhode Island, United States
- Died: 1928
- Education: Wellesley College
- Occupation: Educator
- Known for: Established Wolcott School

Anna Wolcott Vaile (May 25, 1868 – 1928) was an American educator who established the Wolcott School for Girls and was on the Board of Regents for the University of Colorado.

== Early life ==
Anna Louise Wolcott was born on May 25, 1868, in Providence, Rhode Island. She was the daughter of Harriet Amanda (Pope) Wolcott and Samuel Wolcott, D.D. Her brother, Edward O. Wolcott, was a United States senator and Henry R. Wolcott was treasurer of the Colorado Smelting and Mining Company. She was educated in private schools and graduated from Wellesley College in 1881.

== Career ==
=== Early years ===
She was the principal of Wolfe Hall in Denver from 1892 to 1898.

=== Wolcott School for Girls ===
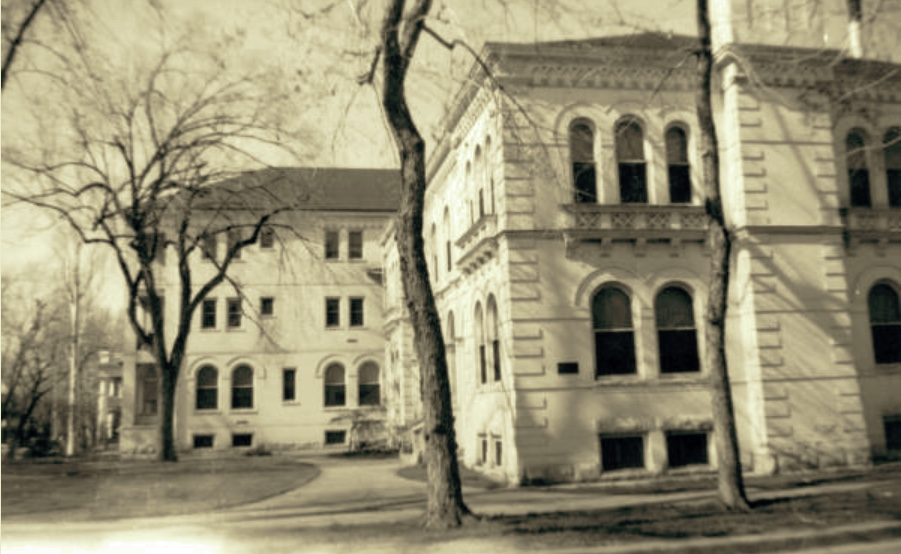
Wolcott School for Girls in Denver, Colorado (1900–1920), Denver Public Library Digital Collections

She established Wolcott School in 1898 to serve the children of Denver society. Former students include Mamie Eisenhower; Helen Brown, the daughter of RMS Titanic survivor Molly Brown, and Clara Cody, granddaughter of Buffalo Bill Cody. Wolcott was the principal and a teacher. Helen Ring Robinson and other faculty members from Wolfe Hall taught at the school. Its first board of trustees included men, her brother Henry R. Wolcott, Adolph Coors of Coors Brewing Company, mine-owner John F. Campion, and attorney F.O. Vaile. Women trustees were Mrs. Charles Kountze, Mrs. David Moffat, and Mrs. Walter Cheesman.

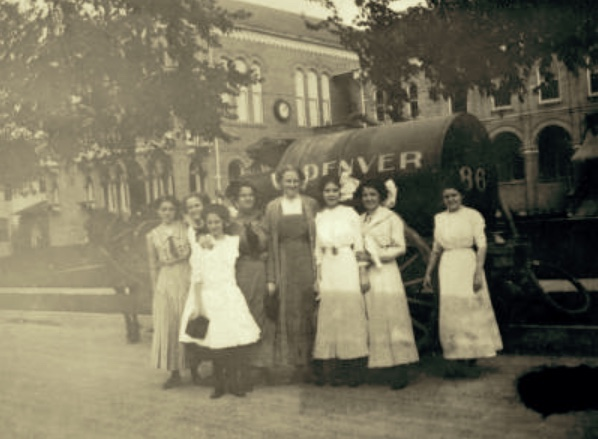
Woman (perhaps Wolcott) and students from the Wolcott School pose by a horse-drawn water truck in the Cheesman Park neighborhood of Denver, Colorado. A clock is on the school wall.

The school taught all pre-college grades of students and prepared students for advanced colleges and universities. Although it was primarily a girls' school, boys were accepted at the lower grades. It was primarily a boarding school, but it also accepted a limited number of non-residents. Academic courses included English, mathematics, history, art, literature, science, a number of languages, astronomy, psychology, political science, and arithmetic. It also had art, music and gymnastic classes. Lectures were also given by people of national reputation. The school produced a Shakespearean play each spring at Elitch Theatre. The school newspaper was The Spokesman.

The school was located at 14th and Marion Streets in Capitol Hill. Built in 1898, perhaps by Frederick Sterner, it was a Renaissance Revival style building with round arched windows and balconies. The school had large classrooms, a music room with a pipe organ, an auditorium, a swimming pool, a bowling alley, and dormitories. In 1906, a three-story addition was added with an alley bridge from the main building, that looked like a Venetian bridge. There were then a total of three buildings. Then, the trustees added a park and clubhouse by 1910.

After Wolcott's marriage in 1912 and until 1922, Mary Kent Wallace ran the school. The school closed in 1924.

=== Other ===
She became the first female member of the Board of Regents of the University of Colorado in 1910 and was vice president of the Colorado chapter of the Congress of Mothers, now the Parent Teacher Association. She was a lifetime member of the Archaeological Institute of America, councilor for the Colorado Society of the Archaeological Institute of America, and a member of the managing committee of the School of American Archaeology.

== Personal life ==
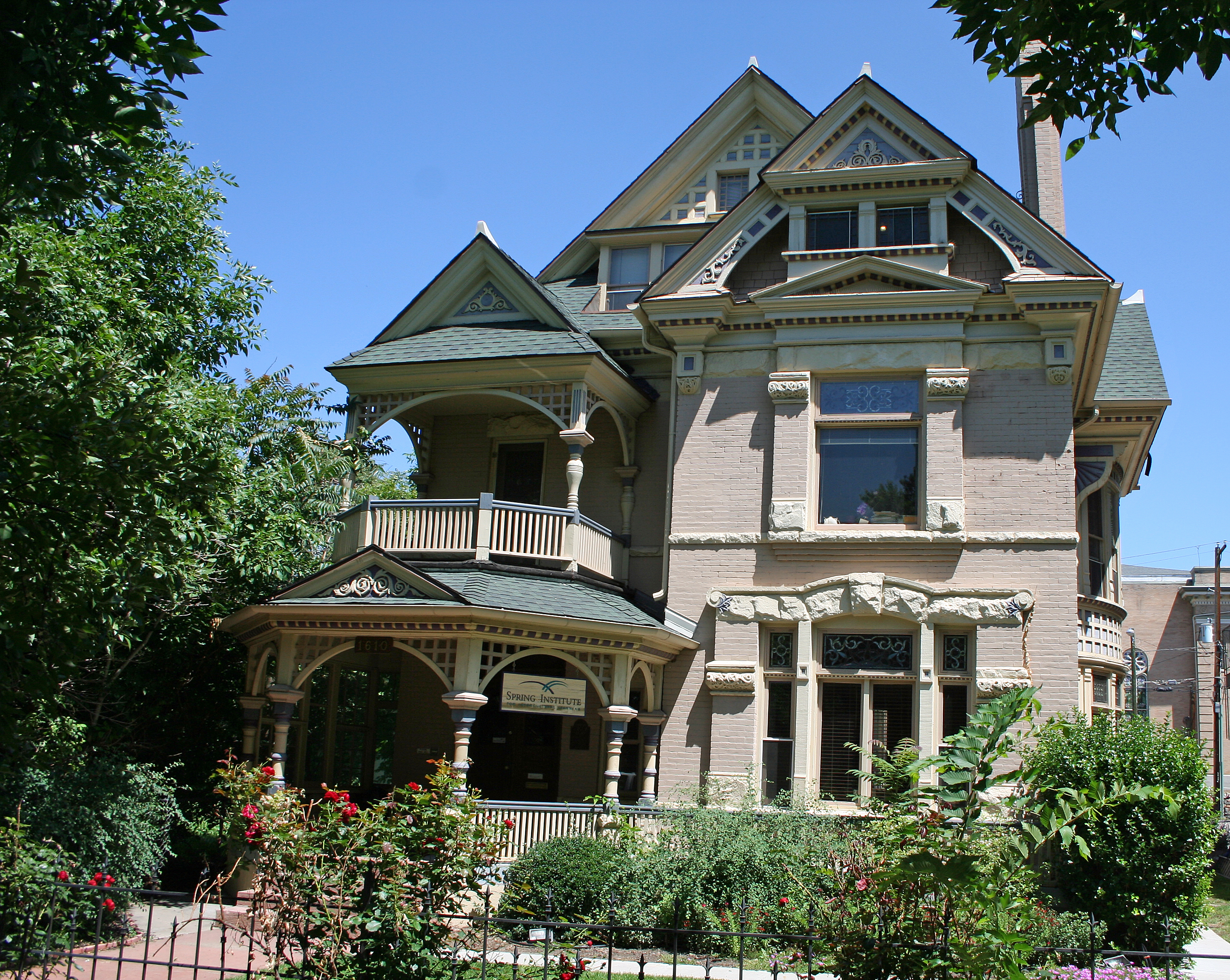
Flower-Vaile House, North Capitol Hill, Denver, Colorado

While a single woman, she was a member of the Artists Club, Society of Colonial Dames, and the State Forestry Association. She was married in 1912 to Joel F. Vaile, also called Frederick J. Vaile. Joel Vaile was an attorney, prosecuting attorney, and president of the Colorado Bar Association. He was a founding member of the law firm Wolcott, Vaile, and Waterman. He was a law partner of her brother, Edward O. Wolcott. The couple lived at his house, the Flower-Vaile House in North Capitol Hill, Denver. Joel F. Vaile retired in 1915 and died on April 3, 1916, while on vacation in Pasadena, California. Anna Wolcott Vaile died in 1928.
