= Elizabeth Tyree =

American actress (1864–1952)

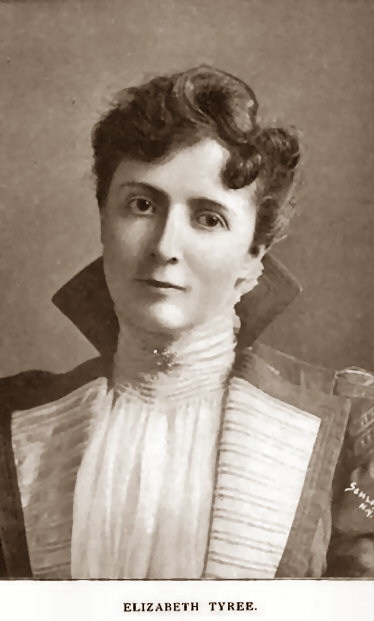
- Photograph of Elizabeth Tyree from Famous Actresses of the Day in America, 1902
- Born: Elizabeth Tyree; November 9, 1864; Augusta County, Virginia U.S.
- Died: August 8, 1952 (aged 87); New York City
- Other names: Elizabeth Tyree Metcalfe; Bess Tyree
- Occupation: Actress
- Spouse: James Stetson Metcalfe (m. 1904; died 1927)

Elizabeth Tyree (November 9, 1864 – August 8, 1952) was an American actress in Broadway theatrical productions beginning in the mid-1890s. Her married name was Elizabeth Tyree Metcalfe. Professionally she was billed as Bess Tyree.

== Early life ==
Tyree was born on November 9, 1864, in Augusta County, Virginia and came to New York City to study at the American Academy of Dramatic Arts.

== Career ==
She appeared in over 20 productions as a member of Daniel Frohman's Lyceum Stock Company, as "Bessie Tyree" until the end of 1895 and as "Elizabeth Tyree" thereafter. Her debut came as understudy to the ailing Effie Shannon in The Charity Ball by David Belasco and Henry Churchill de Mille in February 1890. The Lyceum Company staged The Home Secretary in November 1895. A play in four acts written by R.C. Carton, the themes were love, politics, and society. The time frame of the action is a single evening. Tyree acted the part of Jane Craigengelt in The Courtship of Leonie in November 1896. Written by Henry V. Esmond, the production began the Lyceum's tenth season under Frohman's management.

She depicted Cicely in The Mayflower, a play written by Louis N. Parker, presented at the Lyceum in March 1897. It was based loosely on the Pilgrim emigration to the United States, with settings in Holland, Plymouth, England, and the shore of Massachusetts Bay. Tyree participated in an Actors' Fund benefit at the Broadway Theatre, 1445 Broadway (West 41st Street), the same month. Minnie Maddern Fiske was part of a special selection at the same event. In 1898 Tyree played Avonia Bunn in the first American production of Arthur Wing Pinero's stagedoor comedy Trelawny of the 'Wells'.

She appeared as the leading lady in Gretna Green at the Madison Square Theatre, 24th Street (Manhattan) near Broadway (Manhattan), in January 1903. Written by Grace Livingston Furniss, the play was set in Harrogate in the 18th century. The production featured three lovely stage sets and many actors in Kate Greenaway costumes. Tyree was described by a critic as personally popular and possessing an abundance of talents. In February 1903 she was involved in an accident en route to her West Twenty-sixth Street home. She was returning after a matinee of The Earl of Pawtuckett when she was thrown from her cab when the horse hitched to the hansom slipped and fell on Fifth Avenue (Manhattan) near Twenty-Sixth Street. Her leg was bruised and the injury caused her to be unable to appear. An understudy, Jane Field, replaced her.

In 1918 a play penned by Tyree was staged with Rosamond Carpentier playing one of the primary roles.

== Personal life ==
In 1904, Tyree was married to James Stetson Metcalfe, a drama critic for Life Magazine and The Wall Street Journal. His sister was author Frances Metcalfe Wolcott. He died in 1927 at the age of 68. His funeral and burial were in Buffalo, New York.

She died in 1952 at the age of 87 at her home on 2 West Sixty-seventh Street. Tyree was a founder of the Bedford Hills, New York Community House.
