= Edward O. Wolcott =

American lawyer and politician (1848–1905)

Edward Oliver Wolcott
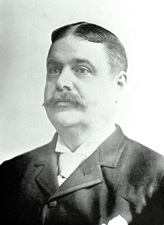

United States Senator from Colorado
- In office March 4, 1889 – March 3, 1901
- Preceded by: Thomas M. Bowen
- Succeeded by: Thomas M. Patterson

Member of the Colorado Senate
- In office 1879–1882

Personal details
- Born: March 26, 1848 Longmeadow, Massachusetts, U.S.
- Died: March 1, 1905 (aged 56) Monte Carlo, Monaco
- Resting place: Woodlawn Cemetery, The Bronx, New York
- Party: Republican
- Spouse: Frances Metcalfe Bass (m. 1890; div. 1899)
- Education: Yale University; Harvard University (LLB)

Military service
- Branch/service: Union Army
- Unit: 150th Ohio Volunteer Infantry
- Battles/wars: American Civil War

Edward Oliver Wolcott (March 26, 1848 – March 1, 1905) was an American lawyer and politician who served as a Republican United States Senator from the state of Colorado from 1889-1901.

== Early life ==
Wolcott was born on March 26, 1848, in Longmeadow, Massachusetts. He was one of eleven children born to Harriet Amanda (née Pope) Wolcott and Samuel Wolcott, D.D., a Congregationalist minister, missionary, and writer of hymns. Among his siblings was Anna Wolcott Vaile, an educator who established the Wolcott School for Girls.As a boy, Wolcott and his family moved to Ohio.

He was a descendant of Oliver Wolcott, signer of the United States Declaration of Independence. He graduated from Yale College before attending Harvard Law School, from where he graduated in 1875.

== Career ==
He served in the 150th Ohio Volunteer Infantry during the American Civil War. He enlisted at age 16.

=== Legal and political career ===
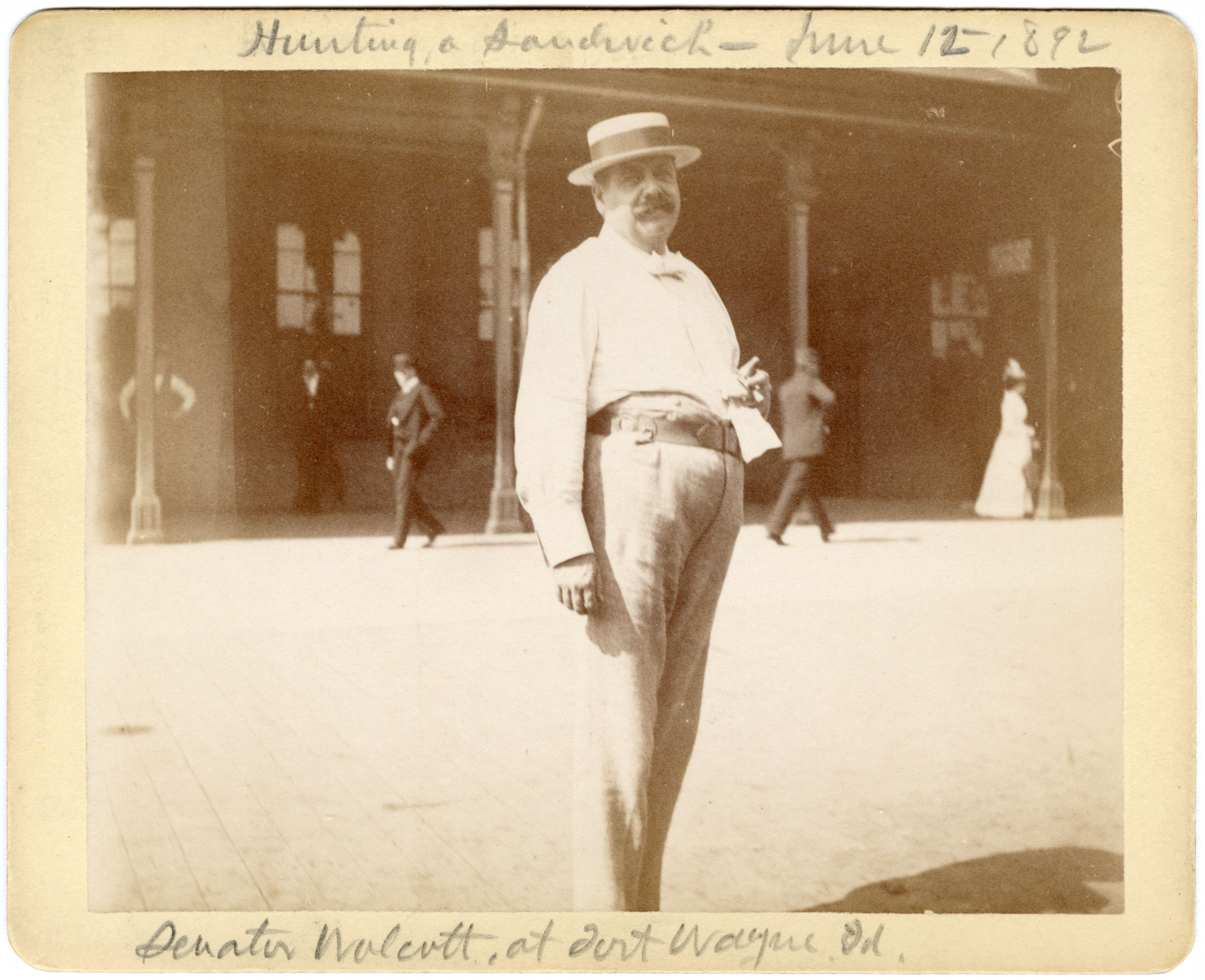
Senator Wolcott on June 12, 1892 in Fort Wayne, Indiana

After graduating from Harvard Law School in 1875, he moved to Colorado where he set up a law practice. In the late 1890s and early 1900s, one of the partners in his practice was Charles W. Waterman, later also a United States senator.

From 1876 to 1879 he served as a district attorney in Colorado. In 1879, Wolcott moved to Denver, where he began his political career as a Colorado state senator (1879–1882). In 1889, he was elected by the Colorado General Assembly to represent Colorado in the U.S. Senate. When he entered Congress, he was the youngest member of the Senate. He was reelected in 1895, and was an unsuccessful candidate for reelection in 1901, 1902 and 1903.

While in Washington, D.C., Wolcott was a leading advocate for the coinage of silver. In 1897, President McKinley named him chairman of the commission sent to Europe to report on international bimetallism. He was a popular host and guest in Washington society. He was chairman of the Committee on Civil Service and Retrenchment (51st and 52nd Congresses), and the Committee on Post Office and Post Roads (54th through 56th Congresses).

In 1900, Wolcott was denied renomination to the Senate, which ended his political career. He once again took up the practice of law in Colorado, and maintained that practice until his death in 1905.

== Personal life ==
In 1890, Wolcott and Frances Esther (née Metcalfe) Bass (1851–1933) were married by The Rev. Francis Lobdell at St. Paul's Cathedral in Buffalo, New York. Frances, the widow of U.S. Representative Lyman K. Bass, was the daughter of James Harvey Metcalfe and Erzelia Frances (née Stetson) Metcalfe of Buffalo. From her first marriage, she was the mother of Lyman M. Bass, the U.S. Attorney for the Western District of New York. They later divorced in 1899.

Wolcott died on March 1, 1905, while he was on vacation in Monte Carlo. Wolcott's remains were cremated in Paris, and the ashes were interred at Woodlawn Cemetery in New York City.

=== Legacy ===
The town of Wolcott in Eagle County, Colorado, is named after him. It was originally known as Bussells, but was changed in his honor.

U.S. Senate
| Preceded by Thomas M. Bowen | U.S. senator (Class 2) from Colorado; 1889–1901; Served alongside: Henry M. Teller | Succeeded by Thomas M. Patterson |
