= Timeline of Boulder, Colorado =

Coordinates: 40.017624°N 105.27966°W

The following is a timeline of the history of the city of Boulder, Colorado, United States.

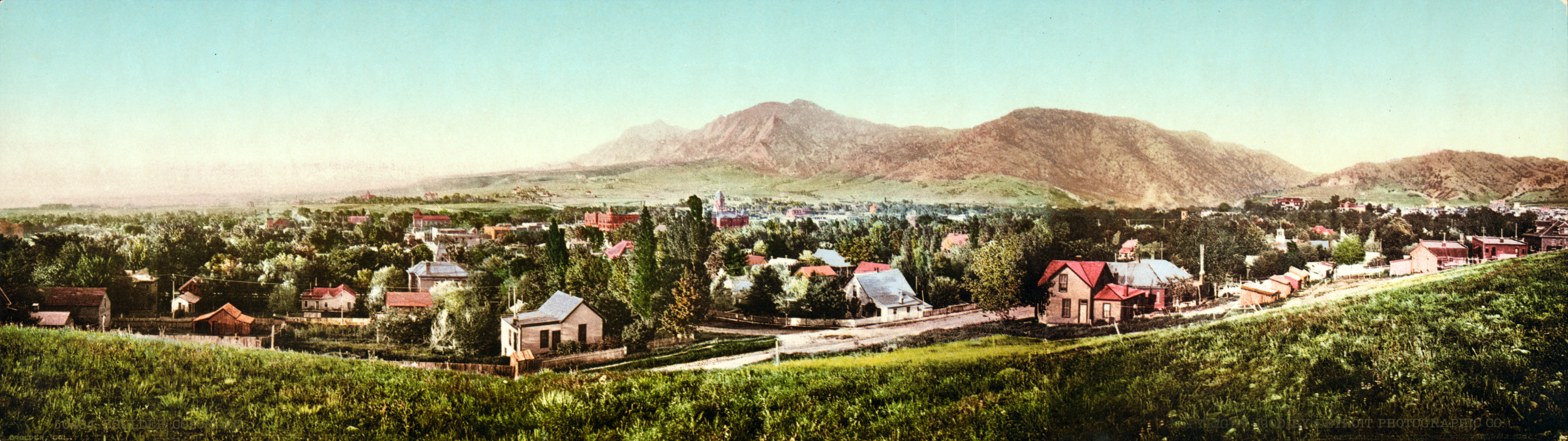
Panorama print of Boulder, 1900

== 19th century ==
- 1858
  - October 17 – A group of gold prospectors from Fort St. Vrain 30 mi. to the east camp in Red Rocks on Boulder Creek in modern-day Settler's Park at the mouth of Boulder Canyon. This was in Arapaho territory, near the camp of Southern Arapaho chief Chief Niwot (Left Hand) (1825–64) in Valmont Butte. Chief Niwot rode to their camp to warn them to leave, but changed his mind after being given food and liquor. He welcomed the visitors, but not before uttering the Curse of the Boulder Valley: "People seeing the beauty of this valley will want to stay, and their staying will be the undoing of the beauty."
- 1859
  - January 15 – gold is discovered in Gold Hill, Colorado above Left Hand Canyon in NW Boulder.
  - February 10 – the Boulder City Town Company is formed, and the town laid out into 4,044 lots, offered for $1,000 each.
- 1861
  - February 28 – the Territory of Colorado is created by the U.S. Congress, causing Boulder to no longer be part of Nebraska Territory.
  - November 7 – legislation is passed making way for the state university to be located in Boulder.
- 1869 – Boulder County News begins publication.
- 1870
  - Denver and Boulder Valley Railroad begins operating.
  - Population: 323
- 1871
  - November 4 – town incorporated in violation of the Treaty of Fort Laramie.
- 1873 – Railroad begins operating.
- 1875
  - September 20 – the first cornerstone is laid for the first building (Old Main Building) on the University of Colorado campus.
  - Colorado Banner newspaper begins publication.
  - Boulder High School established.
- 1876
  - August 1 – Boulder becomes part of new State of Colorado.
- 1877 – September 5 – The University of Colorado at Boulder officially opens.
- 1878
  - The first mayor, Jacob Ellison, is elected for a two-month term.
  - January – Mary Rippon, first female professor at the University of Colorado, joined the faculty.
- 1880 – The town passes the 3,000 population mark, making it eligible for incorporation.
- 1882
  - April 3 – Boulder is incorporated as a 2nd class town, and later that month a new town hall is completed in time for the first meeting of the city council.
- 1883
  - The first courthouse is built.
  - The University of Colorado Medical School opens.
- 1885 – Denver, Marshall and Boulder Railway begins operating.
- 1890
  - Boulder Railroad Depot built.
  - Boulder Camera begins publication.
  - Population: 3,300.
- 1891 – Feeny Opera House active (approximate date).
- 1892
  - Highland School built.
  - University of Colorado Law School established.
- 1893 – Philharmonic Club formed.
- 1895 – Crockett Ricketts elected mayor.
- 1896 – Colorado Sanitarium in business.
- 1898
  - Chautauqua Auditorium built.
  - Colorado & Southern Railway in operation.
  - Boulder Citizen's Band established, now the Boulder Concert Band
- 1900
  - Colorado Chautauqua established.
  - Population: 6,150.

== 20th century ==
=== 1900s–1940s ===
- 1902
  - Boulder Oil Field well begins operation.
  - University of Colorado Museum of Natural History founded.
- 1906
  - Curran Opera House opens.
  - University of Colorado College of Commerce established.
- 1907
  - Boulder adopts an anti-saloon ordinance.
  - Carnegie Library built.
- 1909
  - Denver, Boulder and Western Railroad begins operating.
  - Hotel Boulderado opens.
- 1910 – Population: 9,539.
- 1916
  - Statewide prohibition starts in Colorado, ending with the repeal of national prohibition in 1933.
  - Florence Molloy and Mabel MacLeay start a taxi service in Boulder.
- 1918 – Lucile Buchanan is first black female graduate from University of Colorado Boulder.
- 1923 – Macky Auditorium opens.
- 1924 – Colorado Stadium opens.
- 1926 – Rialto Theatre built.
- 1929 – Denver Municipal Airport begins operating.
- 1932 – The courthouse burns down, and is rebuilt in 1934.
- 1937 – Balch Fieldhouse (arena) opened.
- 1941 – Civic Symphony Orchestra founded.
- 1942 – US Navy School of Oriental Languages moves from California to Boulder and begins training recruits to the US Navy and the Marine Corps in Japanese.
- 1944 – Boulder Historical Society established.
- 1947 – KBOL radio begins broadcasting.
- 1948
  - Andrews Arboretum established.
  - Conference on World Affairs begins at the University of Colorado.
- 1949 – Sommers–Bausch Observatory built.

=== 1950s–1990s ===
- 1950
  - Population: 19,999.
- 1952
  - U.S. National Bureau of Standards-Atomic Energy Commission Cryogenic Engineering Laboratory in operation.
  - Denver-Boulder Turnpike opens.
- 1953 – Colorado Daily in publication.
- 1954 – September: U.S. National Bureau of Standards (now known as National Institute of Standards and Technology) facility dedicated.
- 1955 – Denver Regional Council of Governments formed.
- 1956 – Ball Aerospace & Technologies Corp. (commonly Ball Aerospace), opens.
- 1958
  - Boulder Philharmonic Orchestra founded.
  - Colorado Shakespeare Festival begins.
- 1963 – Crossroads Mall in business.
- 1966 – Attention Homes opens its first home on 14th St.
- 1967 – U.S. National Center for Atmospheric Research Mesa Laboratory built.
- 1969 – Regional Transportation District (public transit system) organized.
- 1970
  - City "comprehensive plan" created.
  - Paladin Press in business.
- 1971
  - Boulder Arts and Crafts Cooperative founded.
  - Penfield Tate, Boulder's first and only black mayor, elected to Boulder City Council.
- 1973 – Vajradhatu headquartered in Boulder.
- 1974 – Naropa Institute and Jack Kerouac School of Disembodied Poetics established.
- 1974 – a series of bombings kill six Chicano activists (Los Seis de Boulder).
- 1975
  - KBVL radio begins broadcasting.
  - March 26 – Boulder County Clerk Clela Rorex issued first same-sex marriage license in U.S.
- 1976
  - Colorado Music Festival begins.
  - Residential-growth management ordinance approved.
- 1977
  - Pearl Street Mall constructed.
  - KBCO begins broadcasting.
- 1978
  - Community radio station KGNU begins broadcasting
- 1979
  - Colorado University Events Center (arena) opens.
  - Bolder Boulder 10K footrace begins.
- 1980 – Kinetics Conveyance Race begins.
- 1983 – January 1: Polar Bear Plunge begins.
- 1986
  - Sister city relationship established with Lhasa, Tibet.
- 1987
  - Farmer's Market opens.
  - Sister city relationship activated with Dushanbe, Tajikistan.
- 1988 – Colorado MahlerFest begins.
- 1989 – Rocky Mountain Spiritual Emergence Network Times begins publication.
- 1990 – Radio Reading Service of the Rockies founded.
- 1991
  - Culinary School of the Rockies founded.
  - eTown (radio program) begins broadcasting.
- 1993
  - Mountain Sun pub in business.
  - Boulder Weekly begins publication.
- 1994
  - Denver International Airport begins operating.
  - Sister city relationship established with Yamagata, Japan.
  - Boulder Community Network online.
- 1995
  - September 15: First location of Illegal Pete's opens.
- 1996
  - Boulder Area Trails Coalition founded.
  - Smoking ban enacted.
  - Murder of JonBenét Ramsey
- 1998
  - October 31: Naked Pumpkin Run begins.
  - Bob Greenlee becomes mayor.
  - Dushanbe Tea House opens.
  - Bent Lens Cinema founded.
- 2000
  - Sister city relationship established with Ciudad Mante, Mexico.
  - Moondance Film Festival begins.

== 21st century ==
- 2002 — Spot Bouldering Gym in business.
- 2004
  - Mark Ruzzin becomes mayor.
  - Shoot Out 24 Hour Filmmaking Festival begins.
  - Boulder Chamber Orchestra founded.
- 2005
  - Boulder Adventure Film Festival begins.
  - Banjo Billy´s Bus Tours was founded.
- 2006
  - November: Carbon tax approved.
  - Twenty Ninth Street shopping center in business.
  - Bikes Belong coalition headquartered in Boulder (approximate date).
- 2007
  - Communikey Festival begins.
  - October – Outdoor gear co-op REI opens prototype green store on 28th St.
- 2009
  - Susan Osborne becomes mayor, succeeded by Matthew Appelbaum.
  - Jared Polis becomes Colorado's 2nd congressional district representative.
  - Sister city relationship established with Kisumu, Kenya.
- 2010 — Population: 97,385.
  - Radio station KBCO leaves Boulder for Denver Tech Center studios
  - Fourmile Canyon fire burns over 400 homes.
- 2011
  - November: Municipal electric utility approved.
  - Boulder Food Rescue active.
- 2012 — National Institute of Standards and Technology Precision Measurement Laboratory dedicated.
- 2013
  - Falling Fruit (urban agriculture map) launched.
  - September — record-setting major flood disruption
- 2014
  - Galvanize opens Boulder location
- 2016
  - October — Sen. Bernie Sanders headlines ColoradoCare healthcare-for-all ballot Amendment 69 rally at CU Farrand Field
  - Nov. 10 — US36 shut down briefly as anti-Trump protesters march
- 2017
  - October — OpenStreetMap State of the Map U.S. conference at CU Folsom Field
- 2018
  - Ban on assault weapons, bump stocks, large magazines
  - Boulder History Museum, rebranded as Museum of Boulder, opens in former Masonic Lodge on Broadway
  - Radio station KGNU celebrates 40th anniversary, commemorated with Museum of Boulder exhibit
- 2021
  - March 21 — A mass shooting occurs at a King Soopers supermarket in Boulder.
- 2025
  - June 1 — 2025 Boulder fire attack

== See also ==
- History of Boulder, Colorado
- List of mayors of Boulder, Colorado
- National Register of Historic Places listings in Boulder County, Colorado
- Education in Boulder
- Denver-Aurora-Boulder Combined Statistical Area
- Timeline of Colorado history
- Timelines of other cities in Colorado: Aurora, Colorado Springs, Denver

== Bibliography ==
Published in the 19th century

- "Boulder", The Rocky Mountain Directory and Colorado Gazetteer, for 1871, Denver: Samuel S. Wallihan & Company, 1870 – via Internet Archive
- "Boulder", History of Clear Creek and Boulder Valleys, Colorado, Chicago: O.L. Baskin & Co., 1880
- "Boulder". Complete Pronouncing Gazetteer, Or, Geographical Dictionary of the World. Lippincott. 1880.
- "Boulder". Colorado, New Mexico, Utah, Nevada, Wyoming and Arizona Gazetteer and Business Directory. Chicago: Polk & Co. and A.C. Danser. 1884 – via HathiTrust.

Published in the 20th century

- "Boulder (Colorado)" . Encyclopædia Britannica. Vol. 4 (11th ed.). 1910. p. 319.
- Frederick Law Olmsted (1910), The improvement of Boulder, Colorado, OCLC 5149048, OL 6545366M
- Francis Potter Daniels (1911), The flora of Boulder, Colorado, and vicinity, Columbia, Mo.: The University of Missouri, OL 13520773M
- Federal Writers’ Project (1945). "Boulder". Colorado: a Guide to the Highest State. American Guide Series. New York: Hastings House. p. 105+.

Published in the 21st century

- "Boulder, CO". U.S. City Open Data Census. Sunlight Foundation and Open Knowledge International. 2018. Archived from the original on November 18, 2018.
