= Timeline of Colorado Springs, Colorado =

The following is a timeline of the history of the city of Colorado Springs, Colorado, USA.

== 19th century ==
- 1871 - Colorado Springs Company founded by William Jackson Palmer.
- 1872
  - Town incorporated.
  - Out West newspaper begins publication.
- 1873 - Town becomes seat of El Paso County.
- 1874
  - Colorado College and Colorado School for Deaf Mutes established.
  - Grasshopper plague.
  - Jackson house (residence) built.
  - Evergreen Cemetery in use.
- 1875 - El Paso County Library (social library) active.
- 1876 - Town becomes part of the new State of Colorado.
- 1880 - Four chalybeate mineral springs (iron salts and other minerals) were discovered along Monument Creek in October 1880 by Dr. Charles Gatchell.
- 1882 - Antlers Hotel in business.
- 1885 - Colorado Midland Railway in operation.
- 1890
  - Alamo Hotel built.
  - Free Library and Reading Room Association established.
- 1891
  - Gold found in nearby Cripple Creek.
  - Pikes Peak cog railway and St. Mary's Church built.
- 1892 - Pike National Forest established near Colorado Springs.
- 1893 - High School Building opens.
- 1899
  - Van Briggle Art Pottery founded.
  - Tesla Experimental laboratory built on knob hill

== 20th century ==
- 1901 - Colorado Springs and Cripple Creek District Railway begins operating.
- 1903 - El Paso County Courthouse building constructed.
- 1904 - Colorado Springs City Hall built.
- 1905
  - Colorado Springs Public Library-Carnegie Building opens.
  - Henry Clay Hall becomes mayor.
- 1906 - Sons of the American Revolution chapter organized.
- 1907 - Monument Valley Park developed.
- 1909 - Garden of the Gods park established.
- 1910
  - St. Stephen's School and Colorado Springs Light, Heat and Power Company established.
  - Population: 29,078.
- 1913 - Harry H. Seldomridge becomes U.S. representative for Colorado's 2nd congressional district.
- 1917 - Colorado City becomes part of Colorado Springs.
- 1918 - Broadmoor Hotel in business.
- 1919 - Broadmoor Art Academy founded.
- 1920 - Blair's Business College established.
- 1923 - Colorado Springs Municipal Auditorium and Cottonwood Creek Bridge built.
- 1925 - Alexander Airport built.
- 1926
  - National Methodist Sanitorium opens.
  - New pavilion at Tahama Spring is constructed.
- 1928 - Alexander Film Company relocates to Colorado Springs.
- 1935 - Peak Theatre opens.
- 1936 - Colorado Springs Fine Arts Center built.
- 1937
  - Pikes Peak or Bust Rodeo begins.
  - Colorado Springs Museum established.
- 1938 - Broadmoor Ice Palace (skating rink) opens.
- 1940 - Population: 33,237.
- 1941 - U.S. military Camp Carson established.
- 1946 - Colorado Springs Gazette-Telegraph newspaper in publication.
- 1948 - Peterson Field established.
- 1949 - Pikes Peak Range Riders active.
- 1953 - Pikes Peak Ghost Town in business.
- 1956 - Santa's Workshop opens near city.
- 1957 - North American Aerospace Defense Command established.
- 1958 - United States Air Force Academy established near city.
- 1962 - United States Air Force Academy Cadet Chapel built.
- 1964 - Cheyenne Mountain nuclear bunker built near city.
- 1965 - Colorado Technical College and University of Colorado, Colorado Springs established.
- 1967 - Pikes Peak Community College established.
- 1969 - Floyd W. Pettie becomes the first black person elected to the Colorado Springs City Council
- 1970
  - Colorado Springs Sun newspaper begins publication.
  - Population: 135,060.
- 1974 - Care and Share food bank incorporated.
- 1975
  - Peterson U.S. Air Force Base active.
  - Larry Ochs becomes mayor.
- 1978
  - United States Olympic Training Center opens.
  - National Sports Festival held.
- 1979
  - Professional Rodeo Cowboys Association headquartered in city.
  - Bob Isaac becomes mayor.
  - Professional Rodeo Hall of Champs and Colorado Springs Pioneers Museum open.
- 1980 - Pikes Peak Genealogical Society founded.
- 1982
  - Colorado Springs' annexation of Broadmoor, Cheyenne Canon, Ivywild, Skyway, and Stratton Meadows neighborhoods is upheld by the Colorado Supreme Court after a district court had voided the annexation.
  - Pikes Peak Center built.
- 1983 - Catholic Diocese of Colorado Springs established.
- 1985 - Falcon U.S. Air Force Station in operation.
- 1988 - Rocky Mountain Women's Film Festival begins.
- 1990
  - Norwest Bank Tower built.
  - Population: 281,140; metro 397,014.
- 1992 - Earth Spirit Pagans and Citizens Project established.
- 1993 - Focus on the Family relocates headquarters from Pomona, California.
- 1994 - ADX Florence federal supermax prison begins operating in vicinity of Colorado Springs.
- 1997 - Mary Lou Makepeace becomes mayor.
- 1998 - World Arena, Colorado Springs opens.
- 2000
  - Pikes Peak Greenway opens.
  - Population: 360,890.
  - Prominent gays in the military story published about closeted soldiers here. Part 2.

== 21st century ==
- 2003
  - Colorado Springs Philharmonic Orchestra and Red Rock Canyon Open Space established.
  - Lionel Rivera becomes mayor.
- 2006
  - First marijuana dispensary in state, Cannabis Therapeutics opens to the public
- 2007
  - January: Doug Lamborn becomes U.S. representative for Colorado's 5th congressional district.
  - December 9: The Colorado YWAM and New Life shootings occur.
- 2008 - Hollywood Theaters (cinema) in business.
- 2010 - Population: 416,427.
  - July 1, 2010 - 230 medical marijuana related-businesses with active sales tax licenses meet registration deadline and are allowed to continue operating.
- 2011 - Steve Bach becomes mayor.
- 2012 - June 23: The Waldo Canyon fire begins.
- 2013
  - June 11: Black Forest Fire begins near city.
  - November 5: While approved by 49.3% of county residents in the 2012 election, city officials continue to refuse to allow any recreational marijuana dispensaries to open.
- 2015
  - The October 2015 Colorado Springs shooting occurs.
  - The Colorado Springs Planned Parenthood shooting occurs.
- 2021 - The 2021 Colorado Springs shooting occurs.
- 2022 - The Colorado Springs nightclub shooting occurs.

== See also ==
- List of mayors of Colorado Springs, Colorado
- Timeline of Colorado history
- Timelines of other cities in Colorado: Aurora, Boulder, Denver

== Bibliography ==
- "Colorado Springs". Colorado State Business Directory. Denver: J.A. Blake. 1878. Archived from the original on August 2, 2023.
- "Colorado Springs". Colorado, New Mexico, Utah, Nevada, Wyoming and Arizona Gazetteer and Business Directory. Chicago: Polk & Co. and A.C. Danser. 1884. Archived from the original on August 2, 2023.
- Cripple Creek and Colorado Springs. Colorado Springs: Warren & Stride. 1896. Archived from the original on August 2, 2023.
- "Historical Sketch". City of Colorado Springs. City Council. 1902. Archived from the original on August 2, 2023.
- George Irving Finlay (1906). Colorado Springs; a guide book describing the rock formations in the vicinity of Colorado Springs. Out West Company. Archived from the original on February 25, 2014.
- "Colorado Springs", United States (4th ed.), Leipzig: K. Baedeker, 1909, OCLC 02338437
- Federal Writers’ Project (1945). "Colorado Springs". Colorado: a Guide to the Highest State. American Guide Series. New York: Hastings House. p. 111+. OL 24557683M.
- Ory Mazar Nergal, ed. (1980), "Colorado Springs", Encyclopedia of American Cities, New York: E.P. Dutton, OL 4120668M
- George Thomas Kurian (1994), "Colorado Springs", World Encyclopedia of Cities, vol. 1: North America, Santa Barbara, Calif.: ABC-CLIO
- "Colorado: Southern Front Range: Colorado Springs", Rocky Mountains, Lonely Planet, 1999, OL 22952362M
