= Timeline of Denver =

Coordinates: 39.739167°N 104.984722°W

Location of Denver in the United States of America.

The following is a timeline of the history of the city of Denver, Colorado, United States, from its founding in 1858 to the present.

== 1800s ==
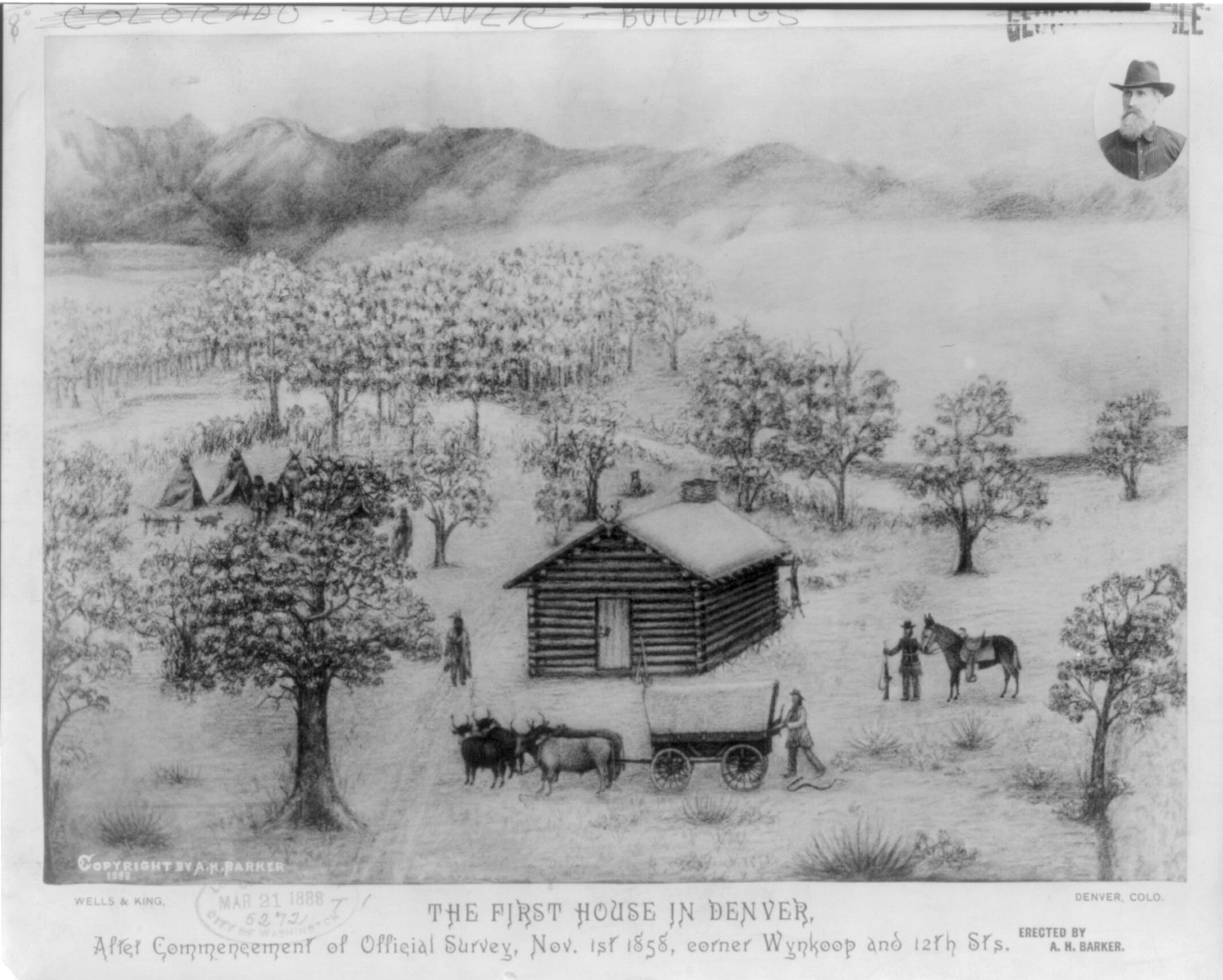
The First House in Denver (1858)

=== 1855 to 1879 ===
By 1855, the area surrounding present-day Denver remained sparsely populated, though American trappers, traders, military surveyors, and overland travelers regularly passed through the South Platte River valley. Small numbers of American prospectors and settlers had begun entering the region in advance of the later gold rush, but no permanent American town had yet been established in the immediate area.

- 1858
  - September 24: A group of squatters draw up an agreement to found the St. Charles Town Association in what is now downtown Denver.
  - November 1: The settlement of Auraria, Kansas Territory founded in the low ground near the confluence of the Platte and Cherry Creek.
  - November 22: Denver City founded east of Cherry Creek as a rival to Auraria, displacing the St. Charles Association.
- 1859
  - The first burial ground, the Mount Prospect Cemetery (later called the Old Denver City Cemetery) was established.
  - John C. Moore becomes mayor.
  - April 23: Rocky Mountain News begins publication.
  - May 7: First stagecoaches of the Leavenworth and Pike's Peak Stage Company arrive in Denver.
  - October 3: The first school, a private institution founded by O.J. Goldrick, opens for classes in Auraria on 12th Street between Market and Larimer Streets.
- 1860
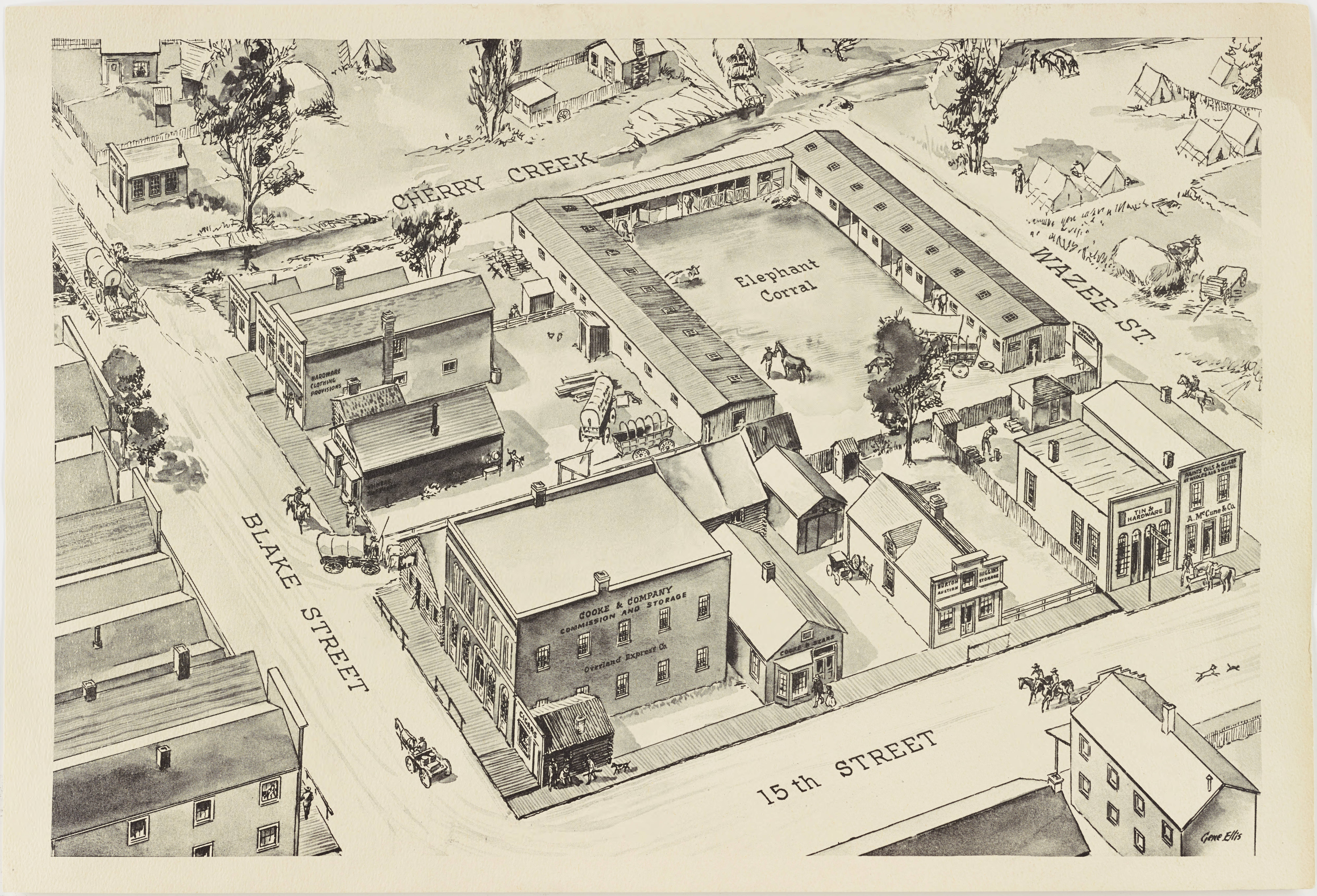
  Illustration of Denver in 1860
  - Population of the City: 4,749
  - Construction of the first canal called, the "Big Ditch", to deliver water to the city begun by the Capitol Hydraulic Company.
  - January – Denver Police Department established by Mayor Moore, replacing Denver Marshals.
  - April 6: Moonlight ceremony on Larimer Street bridge over Cherry Creek unites Auraria with Denver City.
  - May 18: Barney Ford, who later became an important civil rights activist, arrives in Denver for the first time.
  - July – Clark, Gruber & Co. a privately owned gold brokerage and mint, produces the first coins in Colorado.
  - September – "People's Government" formed in the Apollo Hall Saloon in Larimer Square.
  - October 6: James Gordon executed by hanging for the drunken murder of German immigrant Jacob Gantz by order of the "People's Court" and Alexander Cameron Hunt presiding as judge.
- 1861
  - Denver City becomes part of Colorado Territory.
  - November 19: "People's Government" of Denver replaced by the territorial government.
- 1863
  - Telegraph begins operating.
  - April 19: Fire destroys much of Downtown and results in laws requiring new buildings to be made of brick.
- 1864
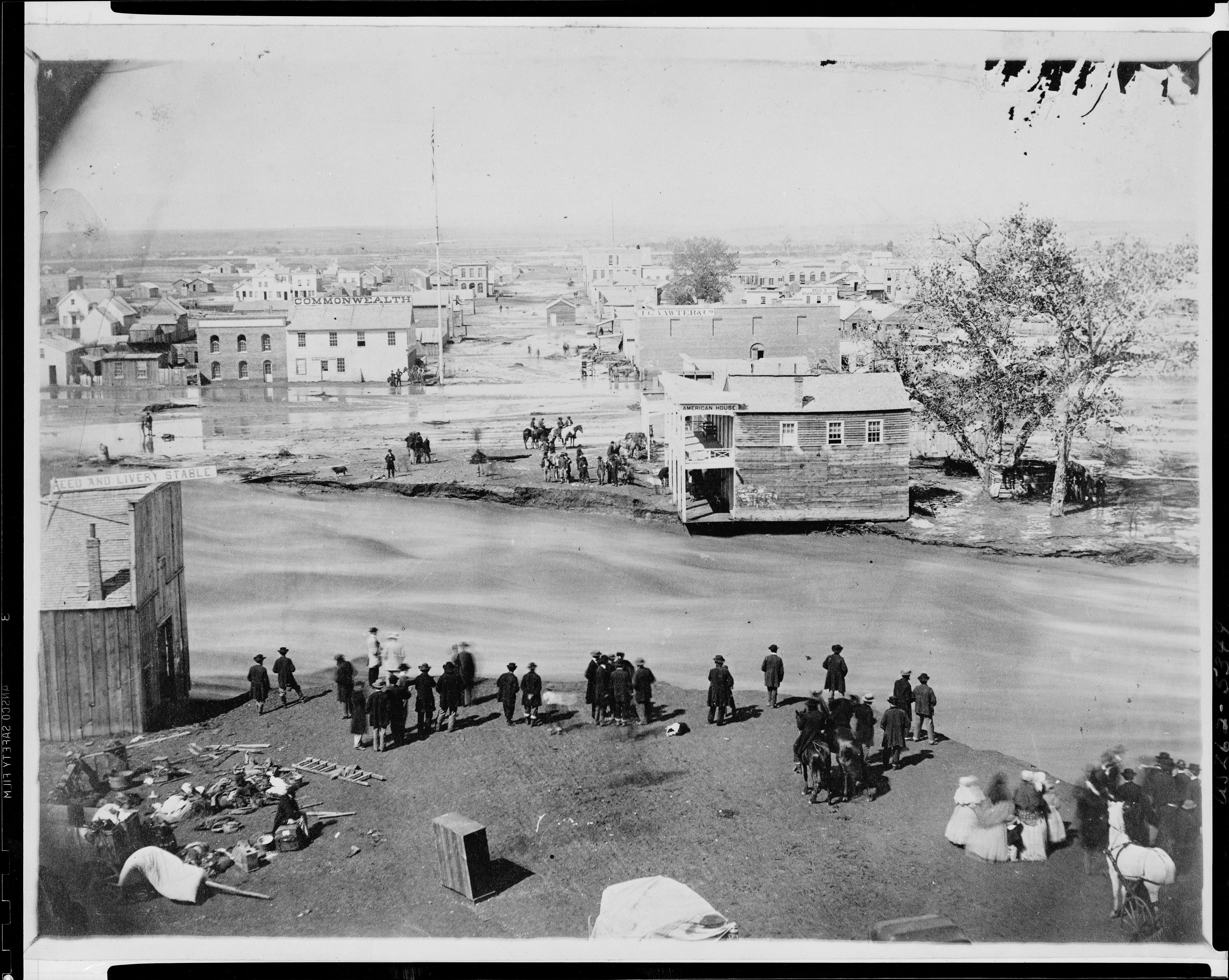
  Flood on Cherry Creek 19 May 1864
  - St. Mary's Academy founded by the Sisters of Loretto.
  - University of Denver founded as the Colorado Seminary by the Methodist Episcopal Church.
  - May 19: Cherry Creek floods destroying city records.
- 1867
  - Colorado Tribune newspaper begins publication.
  - Platte Water Company finishes the "Big Ditch" to provide Denver with water, terminating in Smith Lake in what is today Washington Park.
  - December – Legislature of Colorado Territory votes to relocate to Denver City from Golden City.
- 1868
  - Schools in Denver segregated due to the demands of parents, a separate school for black students being founded at 16th and Market Streets.
  - May 18: Public holiday declared to celebrate the start of construction on the Denver Pacific Railroad to connect with the Union Pacific Railroad in Cheyenne, Wyoming.
- 1870
  - Population of the City: 4,759
  - June 22: Denver Pacific Railroad completed to Cheyenne, Wyoming.
  - August 15: Kansas Pacific Railway completed near modern day Strasburg, Colorado, giving Denver its second railroad connection.
  - November: Denver City Water Company formed.
- 1871
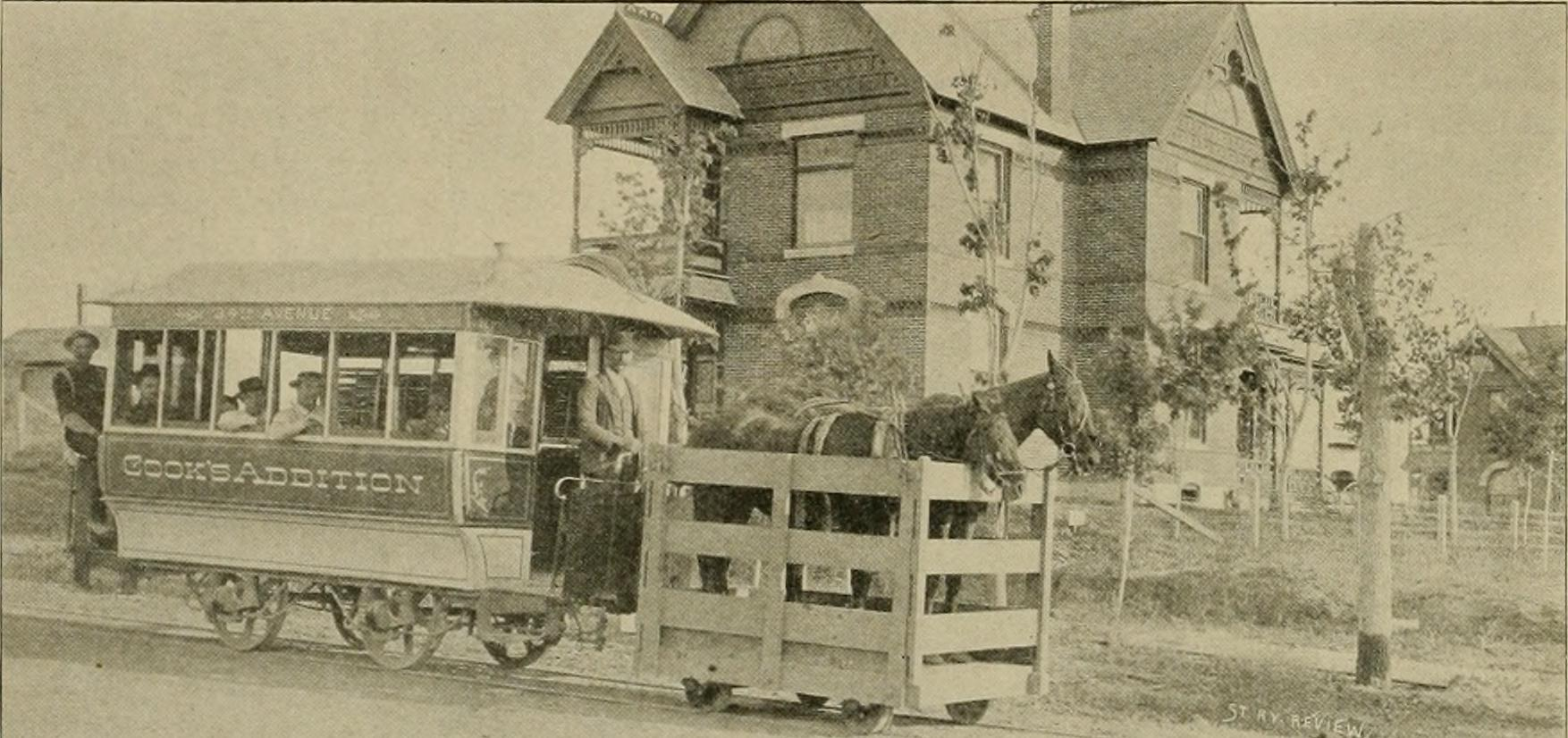
  Horse tram to Cook's Addition in 1891
  - December 17: Denver Horse Railroad the first rail transit service begins operating, changing its name in the next year to the Denver City Railway Co.
- 1873 – Palace Theater, a gambling and entertainment establishment, opened by Ed Chase.
- 1875 – East High School opens as part of the Arapahoe School.
- 1876
  - Riverside Cemetery established.
  - August 1: Denver becomes part of new State of Colorado.
- 1878
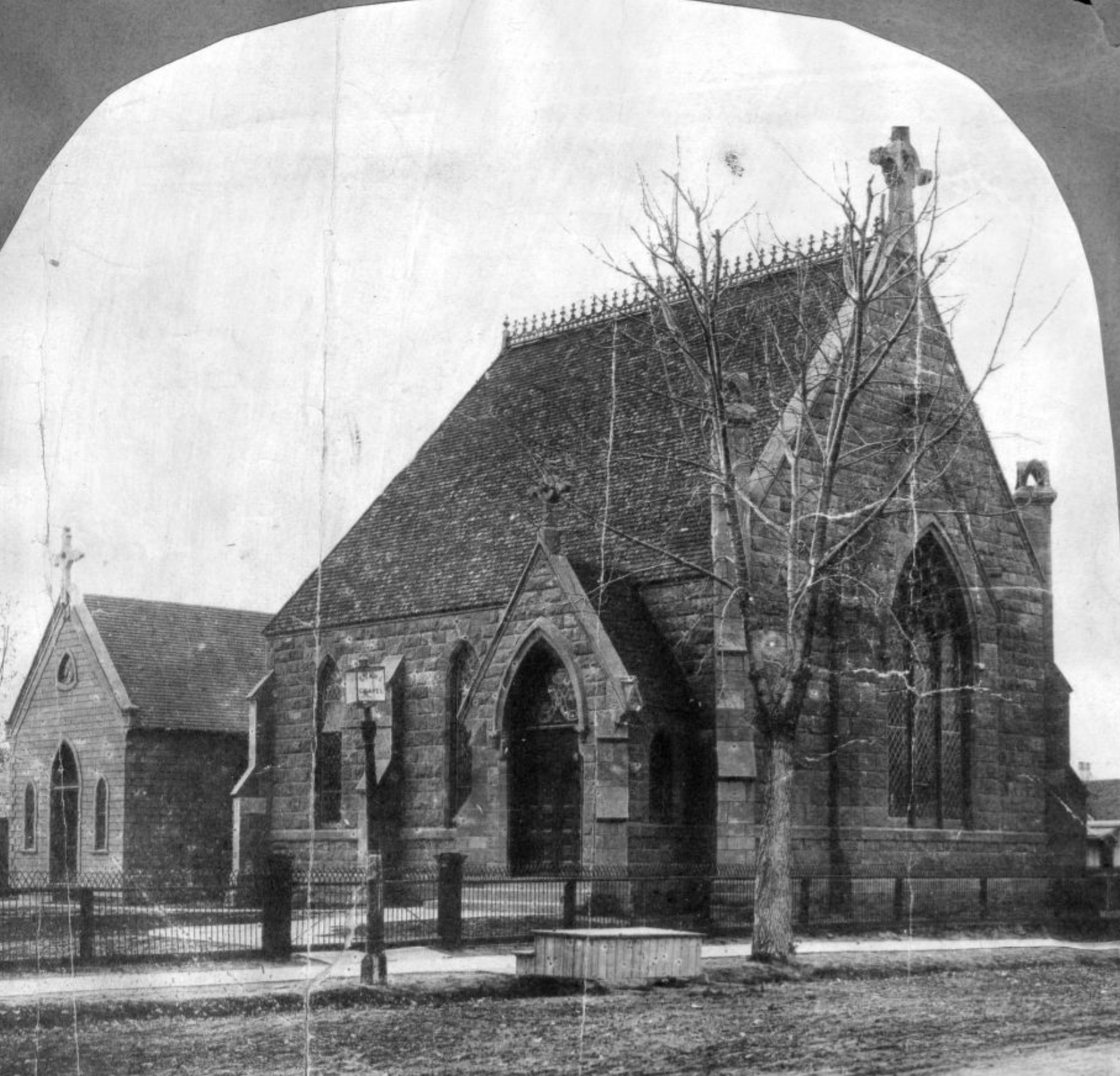
  Evans Chapel c. 1880–1890
  - Central Presbyterian Church completed.
  - Historic Evans Memorial Chapel built by with funding from former territorial governor John Evans.
- 1879
  - Typhoid fever outbreak sickens more than 600 residents and kills at least 40. First of six significant outbreaks that occur through 1896 due to contaminated water.
  - February 24: first telephone exchange in city opens, one of the first 25 in the world.
  - July 11: State Historical and Natural History Society of Colorado, later History Colorado headquartered in Denver.
  - September 1: Delivery of mail to addresses starts in Denver with six mail carriers.

=== 1880 to 1899 ===
- 1880
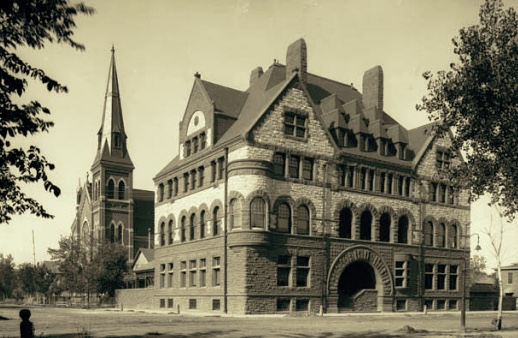
  The Denver Club in 1890
  - Population of the City: 35,629
    50th most populous US city. First time in 100 most populous cities in the US.
  - Denver Club, a private gentleman's club founded by leading wealthy residents.
- 1881
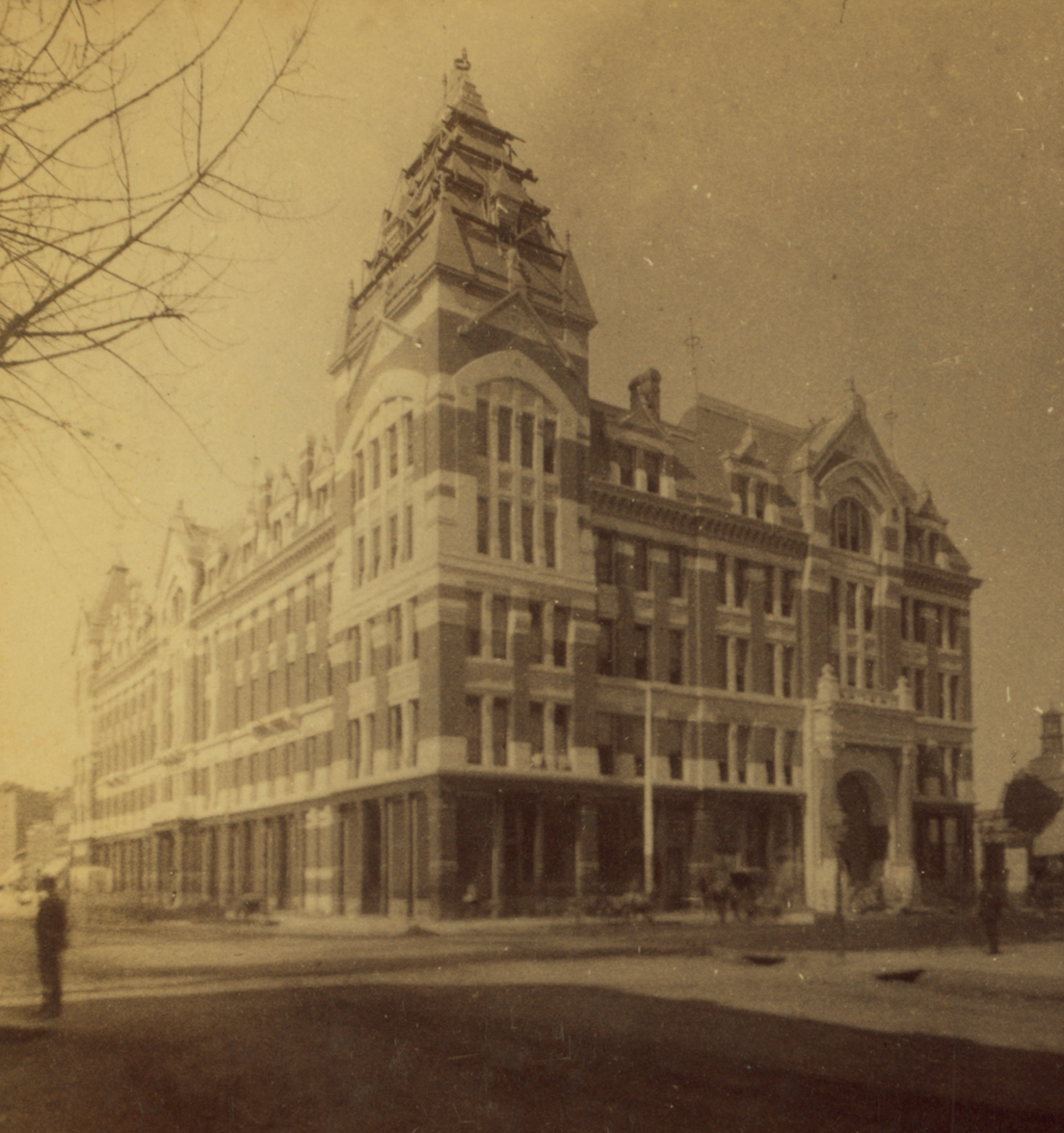
  Tabor Grand Opera House, c. 1888
  - April 13: Denver Fortnightly Club, one of Denver's first women's clubs has its first meeting.
  - June 1: Union Station opens.
  - September 5: Opening of the Tabor Grand Opera House by a production of Maritana.
- 1882
  - High Line Canal opens to provide water to agricultural areas south of Denver.
  - February 18: Purchase of land for City Park approved by Denver City Council.
  - December – Colorado Scientific Society founded in Denver, not incorporated until January 1885.
- 1883
  - First St. Patrick's Day parade organized by Father Joseph P. Carrigan.
  - Second City Hall completed.
  - Arapahoe County Courthouse completed on 16th and Tremont Streets. It served until 1902 when Denver was separated from the county.
- 1884
  - Denver Athletic Club founded.
  - July – Denver Press Club organized.
- 1885
  - November – Mercantile Library, a predecessor of the Public Library, opened by the Denver Chamber of Commerce.
- 1886
  - The Holden Smelter, which later became the ASARCO Globe Plant begins operating.
  - Construction begins on the Colorado State Capitol building.
  - Denver Union Stockyards Company moves to location on the South Platte River bounded by 46th Avenue and 52nd Avenue to the north.
  - "Ugly law" effected, prohibiting those deemed unsightly (generally the impoverished) from public spaces.
  - July 31: Denver Tramway operates first passenger car on 15th Street.
- 1887
  - College of the Sacred Heart (later renamed Regis University) relocates to Denver.
  - February 28: Congress votes to establish an army base near Denver, later named Fort Logan, due to the petitioning of the citizens of the city.
- 1889
  - Construction of the Boston Building, Denver's first modern office building begins.
  - Denver Athletic Club's historic clubhouse is built.
  - July 30: Soapy Smith assaults and injures Rocky Mountain News editor John Arkins. The News declares a crusade to rid Denver of the bad man, which took a decade to complete.
  - November: Permission granted to Citizens' Water Company to go into competition with the established Denver Water Company to build a system to provide water to the city.
- 1890
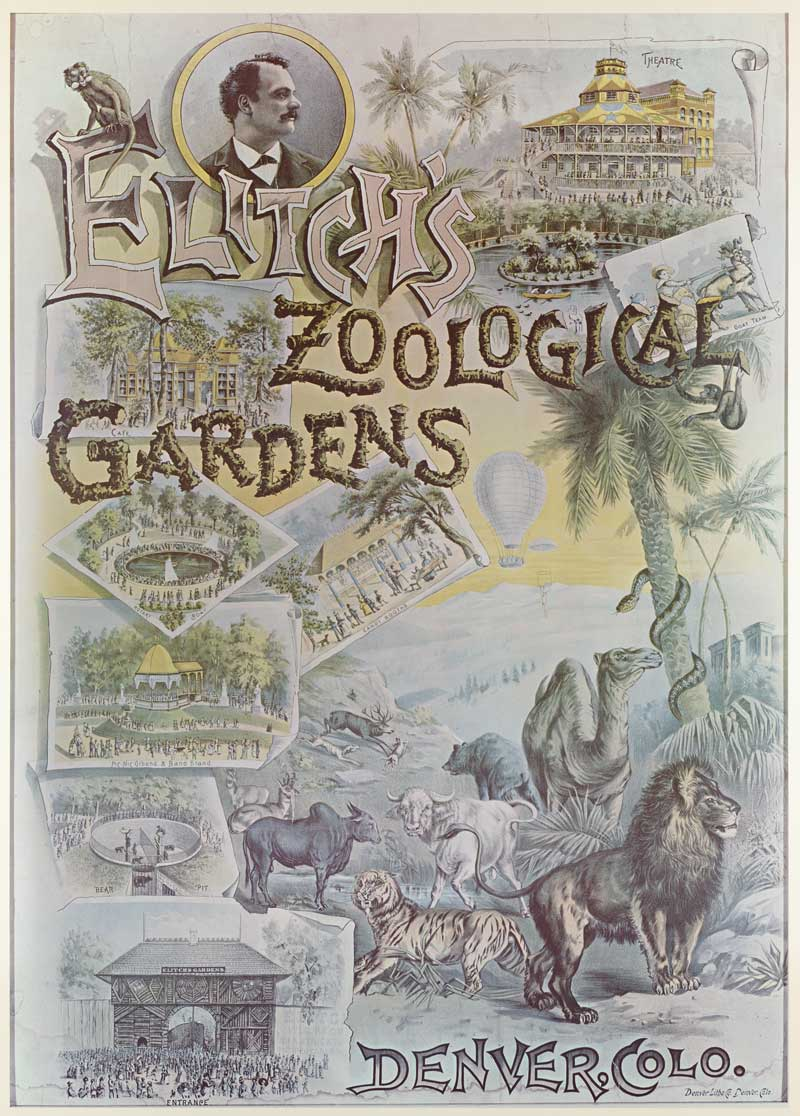
  Poster for Elitch Gardens
  - Population of the City: 106,713
    26th most populous US city.
  - Mount Prospect, the Denver City Cemetery, closed to further burials.
  - April 8: Construction of the Masonic Temple begins at 16th and Welton Streets.
  - May 1: Elitch Gardens amusement venue opens.
- 1891
  - Central Presbyterian Church built.
  - Oxford Hotel, Denver's oldest still existing hotel, built.
  - May 1: Town of Colfax incorporates in what is now the Sun Valley neighborhood.
- 1892
  - The Denver Post newspaper begins publication as the Evening Post.
  - January: The competing town of Brooklyn incorporated an area inside the town of Colfax setting up a six month fight that was ultimately won by the town of Colfax.
  - August 12: Brown Palace Hotel opens.
- 1893
  - Denver's oldest continuously operating restaurant, the Buckhorn Exchange opens under the name "The Rio Grande Exchange".
  - Denver government orders all bodies to be removed from the old City Cemetery.
  - Denver Artist Club, which later became the Denver Art Museum founded.
  - June – Silver prices fall from $1.05 per ounce to 83¢ per ounce, starting the Denver Depression.
  - July
    - 18: Six Denver banks fail.
    - 19: Three more banks suspend payments.
- 1894
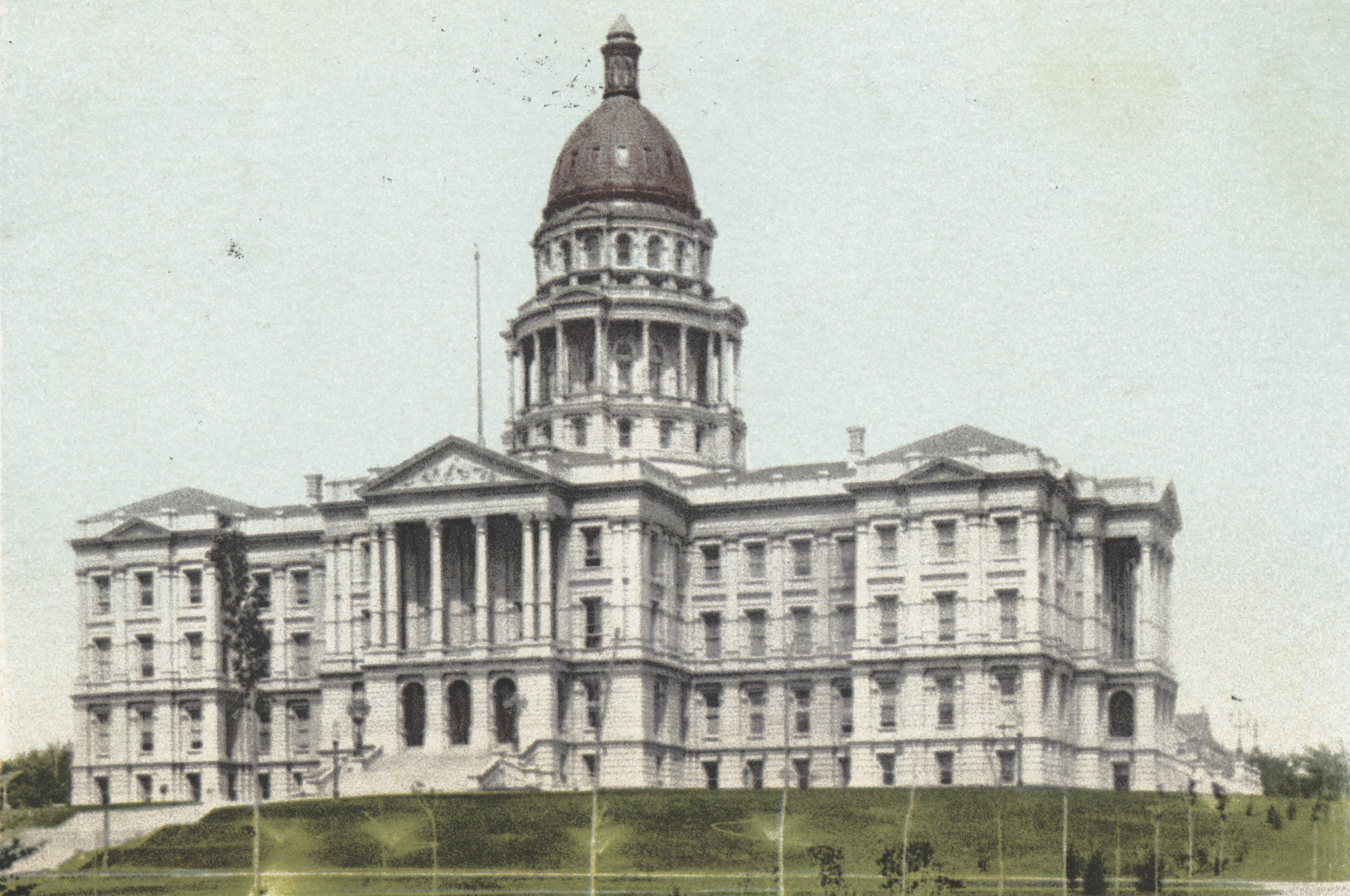
  Colorado State Capitol c. 1901-1902
  - Citizens' Water Company purchases and merges with rival taking the new name, the Denver Union Water Company.
  - February 7: South Denver annexed by the city.
  - Colorado State Capitol building complete, Governor Davis Hanson Waite moves his office to the building.
  - March 15: Governor Waite orders state militiamen to march on Denver City Hall to remove the Police and Fire Commissioners in what became known as the City Hall War.
- 1895
  - October 22–24 First annual Festival of Mountain and Plain.
- 1896 – Denver Zoo founded because of the gift of an orphan bear to Mayor Thomas S. McMurray.
- 1898
  - Denver Public Library established.
  - February 1: Around 10,000 people attempt to attend the funeral of the Congregationalist minister and social reformer Myron W. Reed.
- 1899
  - Washington Park began development, the first phase lasting to 1908.
  - National Jewish Health opens.
  - Spring: Construction of Cheesman Dam begins.

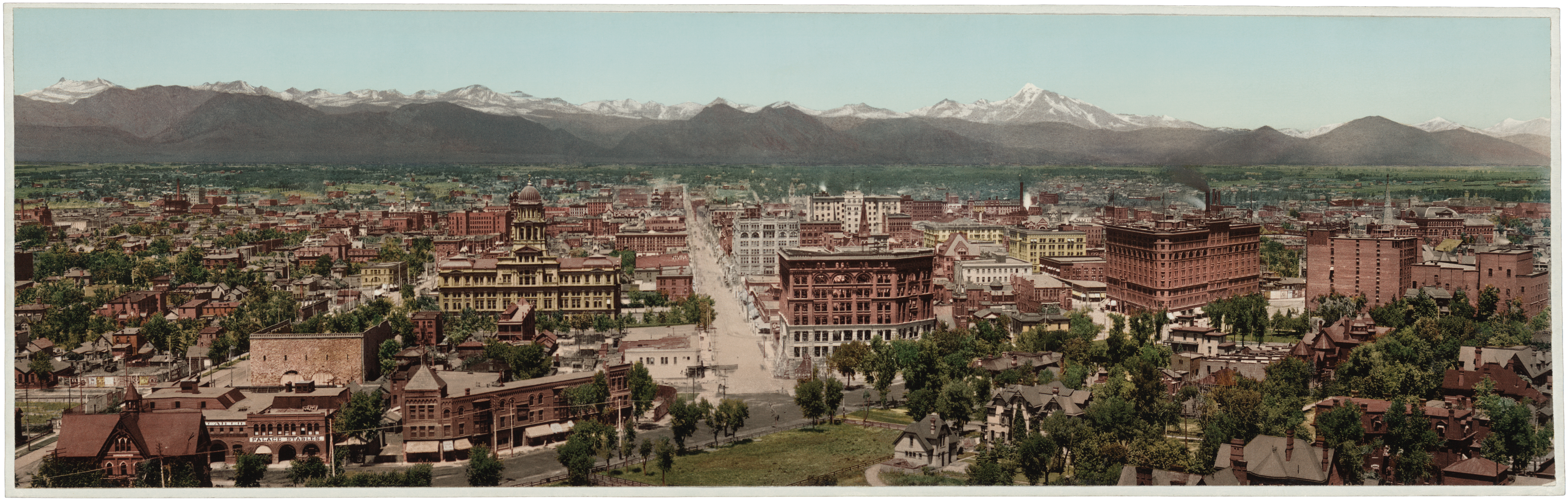
Downtown Denver in 1898 photograph taken from state capitol towards 16th Street

== 1900s ==
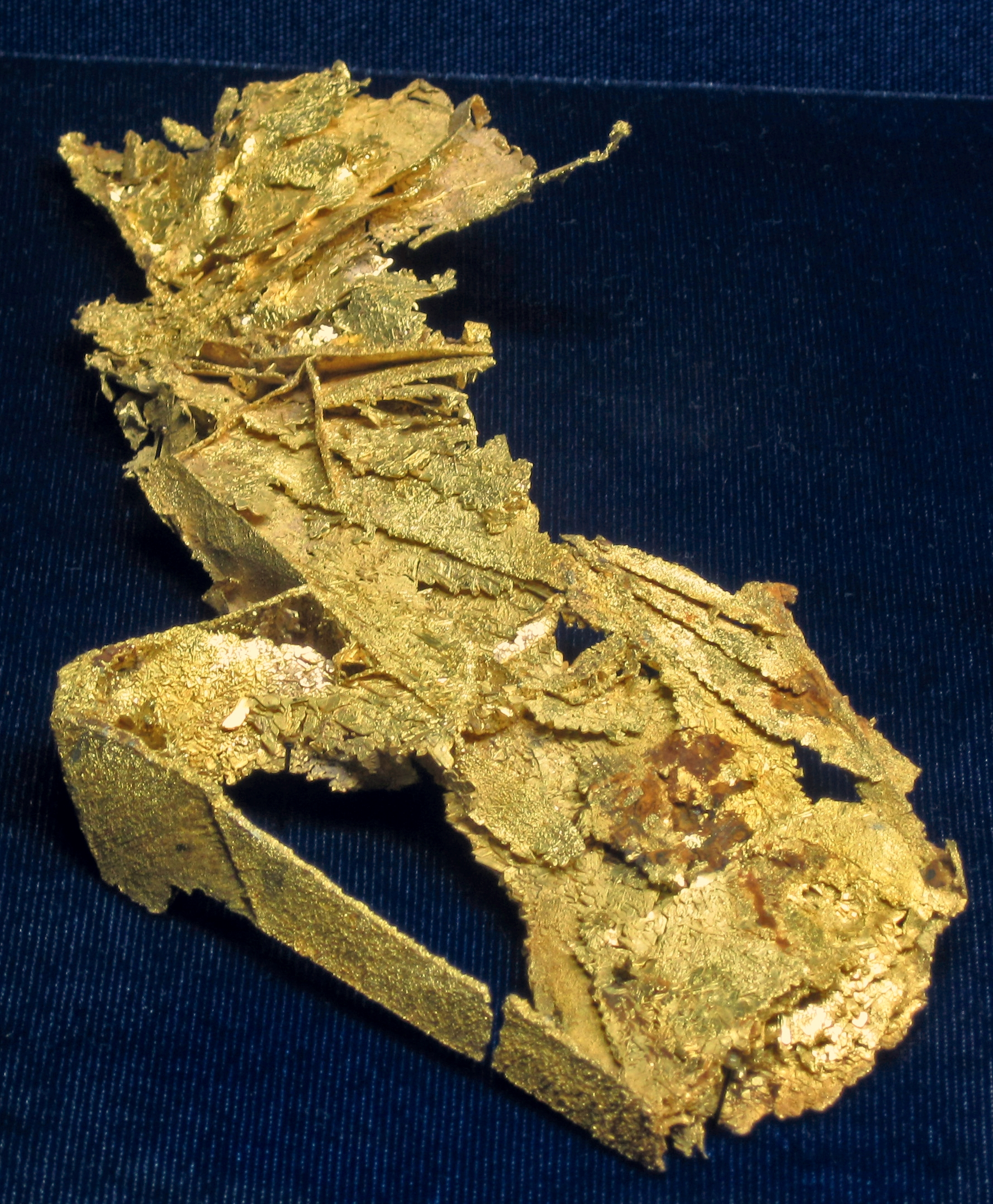
Crystalline gold from Farncomb Hill, near Breckenridge, Colorado.

=== 1900 to 1919 ===
- 1900
  - Population of the City: 133,859
    25th most populous US city.
  - May 3: Spring flood overtops the still under construction Cheesman Dam, flooding low lying areas of Littleton at about 1:00 in the afternoon and sweeping away all but the foundations of the dam.
  - December 6: Denver Museum of Nature and Science incorporated as the Colorado Natural History Museum.
- 1902
  - Voters approve Article XX of the Colorado State Constitution, popularly known as the Rush Amendment, granting home rule for the Government of Denver.
  - Grant–Humphreys Mansion built.
  - June 21: USS Denver (CL-16), named in honor of the city, launched in Philadelphia.
- 1903
  - Denver Juvenile Court established.
  - July – What will become the east wing of the Denver Museum of Nature and Science Completed in City Park.
- 1904
  - May – Robert W. Speer elected mayor for the first time. Judge and reformer Ben B. Lindsey later alleged there were 10,000 illegal votes cast in the election.
- 1905
  - May 9: Water reaches the spillway of the Cheesman Dam. Constructed by the Denver Union Water Company, on the South Platte River, it is the city's first mountain water reservoir and the tallest in the world at the time of completion.
  - Mayor Speer starts tree planting program.
- 1906
  - Municipal code adopted.
  - U.S. Denver Mint begins minting coins.
  - January 29: First National Western Stock Show begins.
- 1908
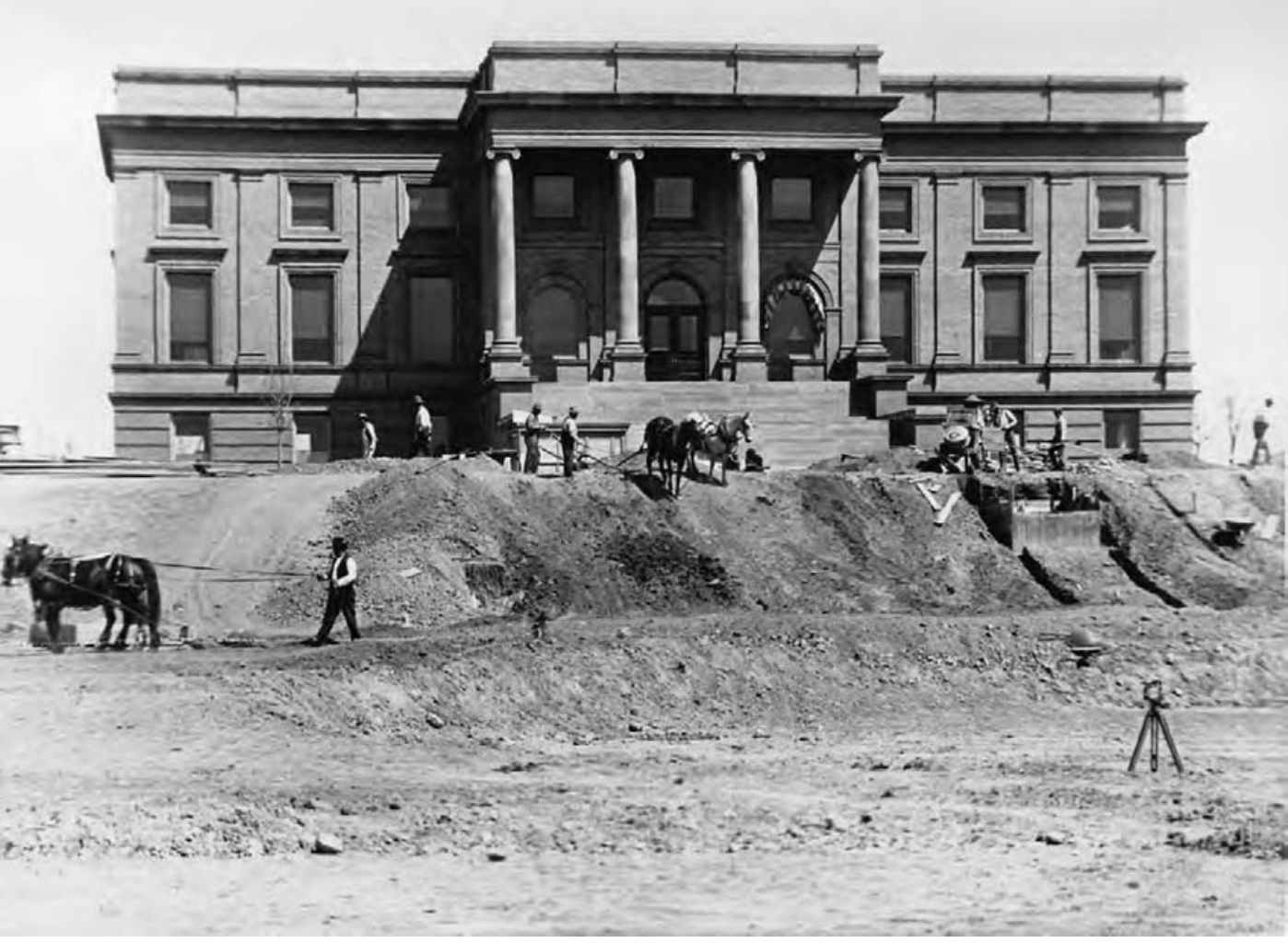
  Colorado Museum of Natural History, 1908
  - Municipal Auditorium opens.
  - A year after the death of Walter Cheesman construction is complete on his mansion, which will later become the Colorado Governor's Mansion.
  - The dome of the state capitol gilded with gold for the first time by state mining industry.
  - July
    - 1: Colorado Natural History Museum opens to public, later renamed Denver Museum of Nature and Science.
    - 7–10: 1908 Democratic National Convention held in Denver Auditorium Arena.
    - 23: Denver and Interurban Railroad from Denver to Boulder begins operation.
- 1910
  - Population of the City & County: 213,381
    27th most populous US city.
  - Construction of the Cheesman memorial in what would become Cheesman Park begins.
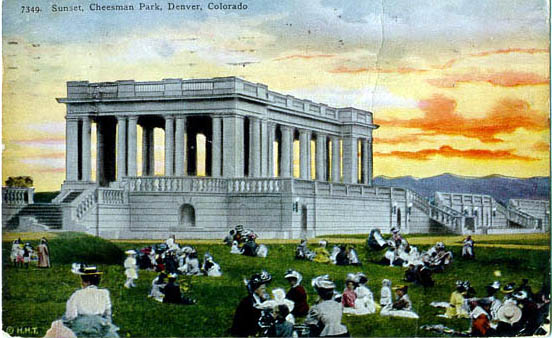
    The Cheesman Memorial c. 1909
  - Denver Gas & Electric Building, a building studded with then modern electric bulbs, completed.
  - Dumb Friends League established.
  - August 11: Children's Hospital Colorado opens.
- 1911
  - Daniels & Fisher Tower completed.
  - The city enacts gun control law making the carrying of concealed guns a felony offence.
  - Charles Gates Sr. purchases Colorado Tire and Leather Company, the business that will eventually become the Gates Corporation.
  - July 17: Mountain States Telephone & Telegraph Company formed in merger of Colorado Telephone, Tri-State Telephone, and Rocky Mountain Bell Telephone.
- 1912
  - January: E.W. Merritt leads fundraising campaign to raise the money to save land in what will become Genesee Park from being logged.
  - May 21: Voters enact a property tax to acquire lands and build amenities for the Denver Mountain Parks.
  - October 21: The inaugural Mass of the Catholic Cathedral of the Immaculate Conception is held.
- 1913
  - August 27: Official opening of the first two Denver Mountain Parks, Genesee Park and Lookout Mountain Park. Though officially the land in Genesee Park is purchased the next month.
- 1915
  - February 26: First issue of the Intermountain Jewish News, under the name Denver Jewish News.
  - September 4: Colorado National Bank opens its new building at 17th and Champa Streets.
- 1916
  - Opportunity School, later the Emily Griffith Technical College, founded by Emily Griffith.
- 1918
  - January 18: Federal Reserve Bank branch opens.
  - August 6: A vote of the people forms the public utility, Denver Water, by purchasing the Denver Water Company.

=== 1920 to 1939 ===
- 1920
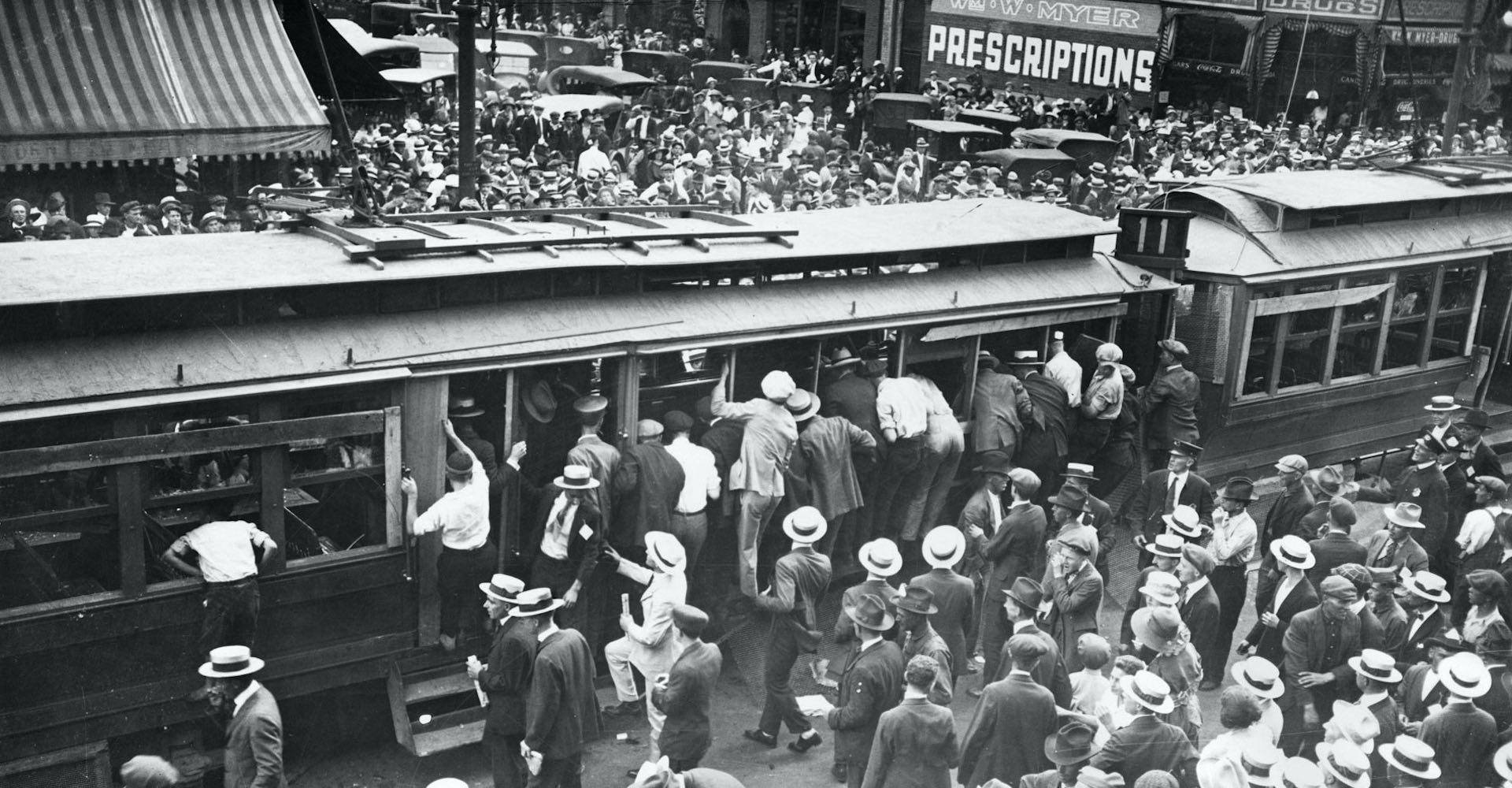
  Photograph of crowd during the Denver streetcar strike
  - Population of the City & County: 256,491
    25th most populous US city.
  - Fitzsimmons Army Hospital built.
  - August: Streetcar strike kills seven, ending with federal soldiers placing the city under martial law.
- 1922
  - Denver Art Museum opens in donated Chappell House at 13th Avenue and Logan Street.
  - December 18: Denver Mint Robbery.
- 1923
  - Benjamin F. Stapleton becomes mayor with the backing of the Ku Klux Klan.
  - Russell Stover Candies started as Mrs. Stover's Bungalow Candies in the owner's Denver home.
- 1927
  - Merchants Biscuit Company joins together with several other companies to form United Biscuit Company of America, the predecessor of the Keebler Company.
  - Molly Brown purchases the cottage the formerly belonged Eugene Field and has it moved to Washington Park for preservation.
- 1929
  - March 26: Ground breaking ceremony for new City and County Building, completed in 1932.
  - October 17–20: Denver Municipal Airport grand opening celebration.
- 1930
  - Population of the City & County: 287,861
    29th most populous US city.
  - U.S. Customhouse built.
  - August 29: Paramount Theatre opens.
- 1932
  - October 29: Denver City and County Building completed.
- 1933
  - August 3: At about 5:00 in the morning the Castlewood Dam collapsed sending floodwaters into Denver.
- 1934
  - November 30: Denver Symphony Orchestra performs its first concert.
- 1938
  - February 26: U.S. Lowry Air Force Base dedicated on the site of the former Agnes Memorial Sanatorium.
  - Denver Housing Authority created.
- 1939 – The Pit, the first gay bar in Denver opens.

=== 1940 to 1959 ===
- 1940
  - Population of the City & County: 322,412
    24th most populous US city.
- 1941
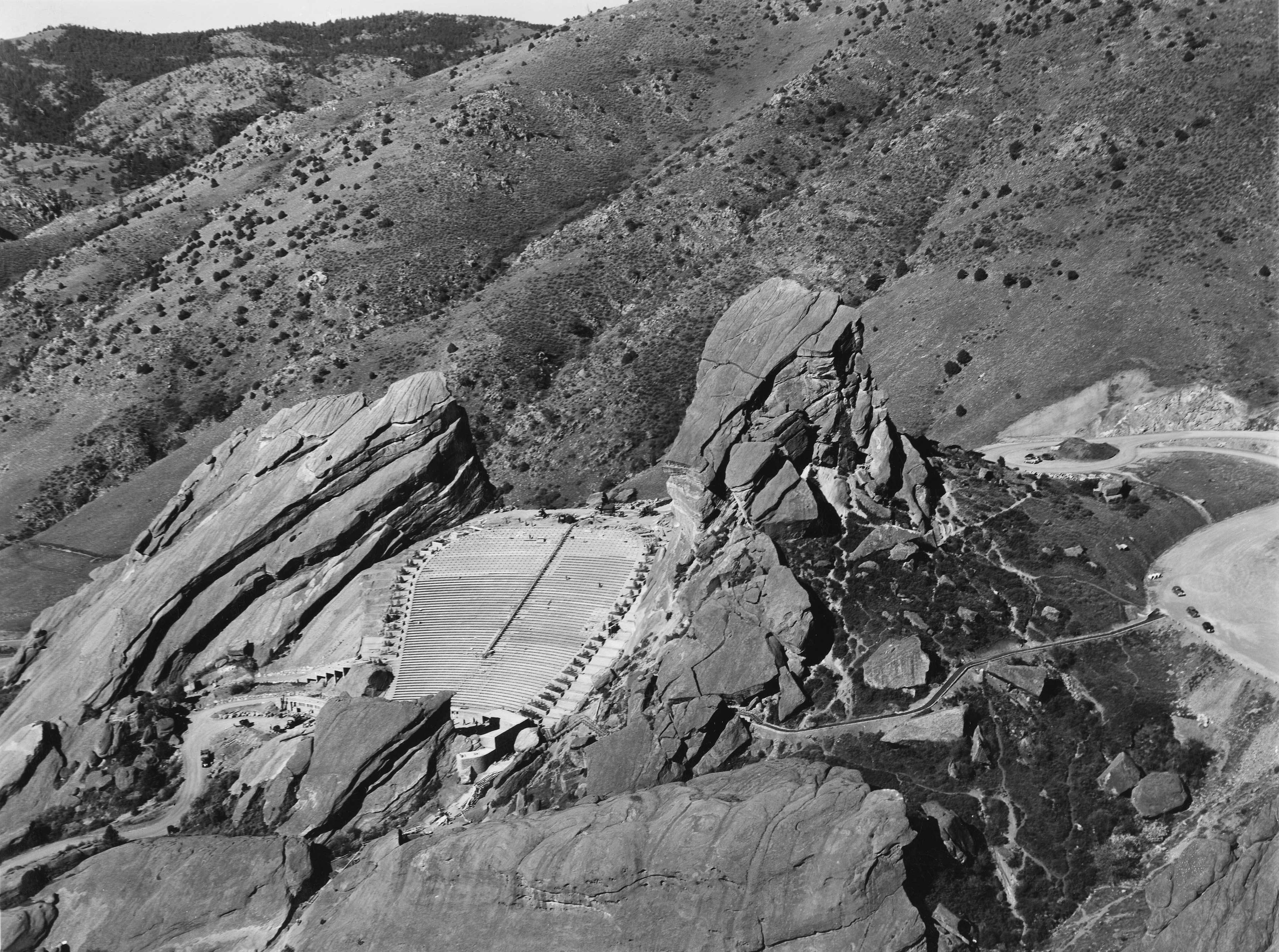
  Red Rocks Amphitheatre photographed from the air, 1941
  - The Denver Ordnance Plant, the first part of what would become the Denver Federal Center, begins operating.
  - June 15: Red Rocks Amphitheatre opens near city.
- 1942
  - April 4: USS Denver (CL-58), the second ship honoring the city, launched in Camden, New Jersey by the daughter of Mayor Stapleton.
- 1944
  - August 25: Denver Municipal Airport renamed Stapleton International Airport.
- 1947
  - J. Quigg Newton defeats incumbent Mayor Stapleton, becoming the first Mayor born in the city and Denver's youngest mayor to date.
- 1948
  - August – Bears Stadium opens.
- 1950
  - Population of the City & County: 415,786
    24th most populous US city.
  - To improve the Denver Zoological Foundation formed to better manage the Denver Zoo.
  - June 3 – Final day of service by the Denver Tramway street trollies.
- 1951
  - Botanical Gardens Foundation incorporated.
  - Joshel House (residence) built.
- 1952
  - January 10: Denver Coliseum dedicated
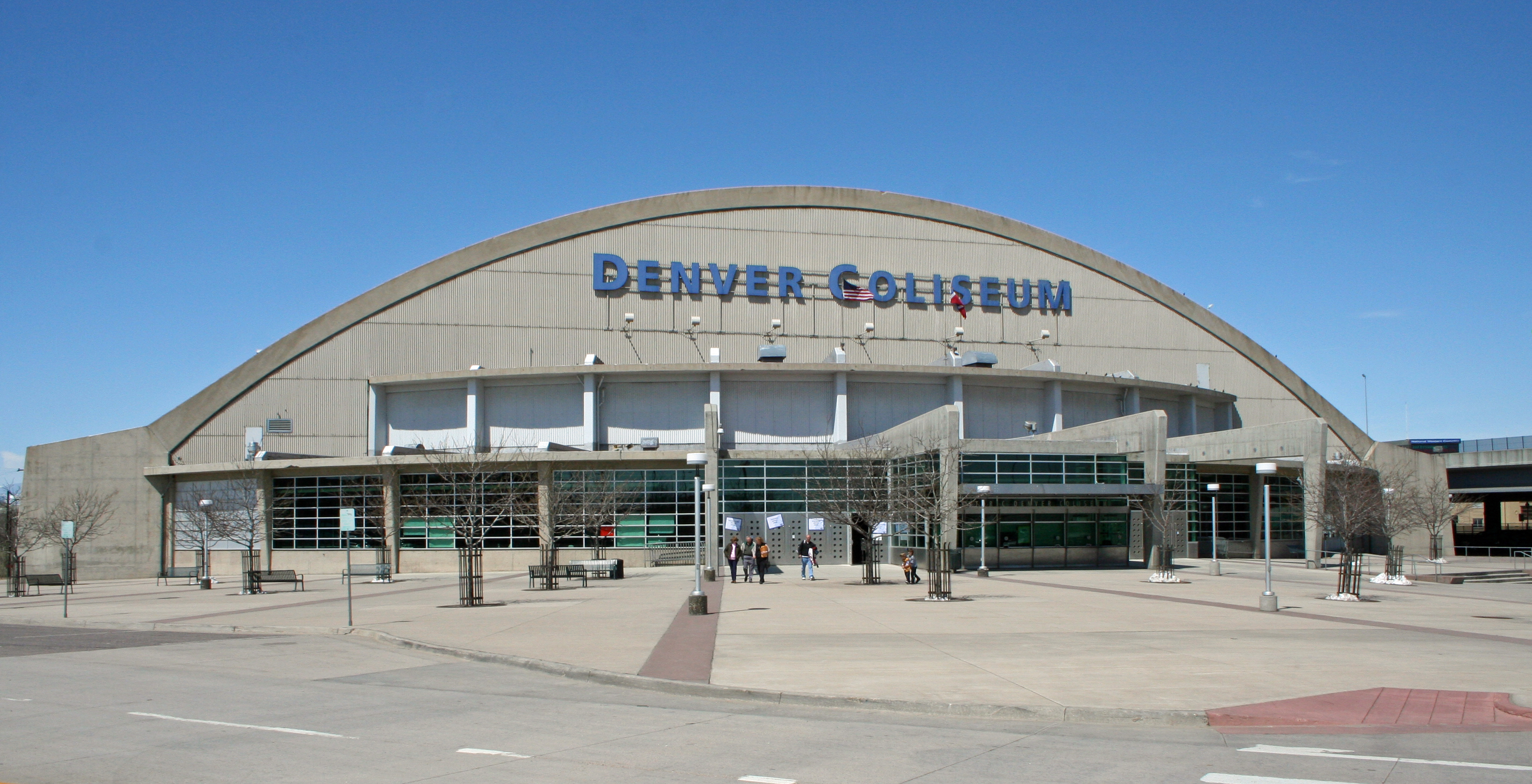
    Entrance to the Denver Coliseum
- 1955 – The Inter-County Regional Planning Commission, predecessor to the Denver Regional Council of Governments, formed.
- 1956
  - January 30: KRMA-TV begins broadcasting.

=== 1960 to 1979 ===
- 1960
  - Population of the City & County: 493,887
    23rd most populous US city.
  - First season for the Denver Broncos football team.
- 1963
  - September 3: Denver Water begins filling Dillon Reservoir in Summit County, its largest reservoir.
- 1965
  - Metropolitan State University of Denver established as a state college accepting students for the fall semester.
  - June 16: Torrential thunderstorms south of Denver send floodwaters into the city, seriously damaging the lowlands west of downtown.
- 1966
  - January – Tropical Conservatory opens in the Botanic Gardens.
- 1967
  - Community College of Denver established.
  - August 9: A 5.3 Mb earthquake affected the Denver area with a maximum Mercalli intensity of VII (Very strong). This was the largest in a swarm of over 300 events that spanned more than a year. Damage was focused in the Northglenn area where walls were cracked, windows were broken, and structural elements were damaged at a church.
- 1968
  - William H. McNichols, Jr. becomes mayor.
  - Denver Regional Council of Governments (DRCOG) created.
  - September 1: Concert promoter Barry Fey produces his first rock concert at Red Rocks featuring Jimi Hendrix, Creedence Clearwater Revival, and Iron Butterfly.
- 1969
  - March 27–31: Chicano Youth Liberation Conference organized by Rodolfo Gonzales
- 1970
  - Population of the City & County: 514,678
    25th most populous US city.
  - Negative income tax program begins.
  - December 11: Historic Denver nonprofit founded to save the Molly Brown House.
- 1971
  - Black American West Museum and Heritage Center founded.
  - April – The Denver Tramway company ceases being operator of the city's transit system, transferring all assets to Denver Metro Transit (later folded into the Regional Transportation District)
  - October 3: New building for the Denver Art Museum designed by Gio Ponti opens in Civic Center.
- 1972
  - First People's Fair held at Morey Junior High School.
  - November 7: Colorado voters reject city bid for the 1976 Winter Olympics.
  - December – The Regents of CU vote to rename the Denver Center to University of Colorado Denver.
- 1973
  - Patricia Schroeder becomes the first woman U.S. representative from Colorado when elected by Colorado's 1st congressional district.
  - Denver Botanic Gardens acquires Chatfield Arboretum site in southern Jefferson County.
- 1974
  - July 4: Regional Transportation District takes over the operations of the Denver Metro Transit.
- 1975 – Children's Museum of Denver opens first location at 931 Bannock Street.
- 1976
  - June 27: First Denver Pride Parade.
- 1977
  - Denver Young Artists Orchestra founded.
  - January – Auraria Campus serving three higher education institutions opens after controversial urban renewal project.
- 1978
  - Denver Film Festival, and South Platte Greenway development begins.
  - Boettcher Concert Hall built.
  - Four Mile Historic Park non-profit established to preserve the historic Four Mile House, the oldest building in Denver.
- 1979 – Denver Firefighters Museum established.

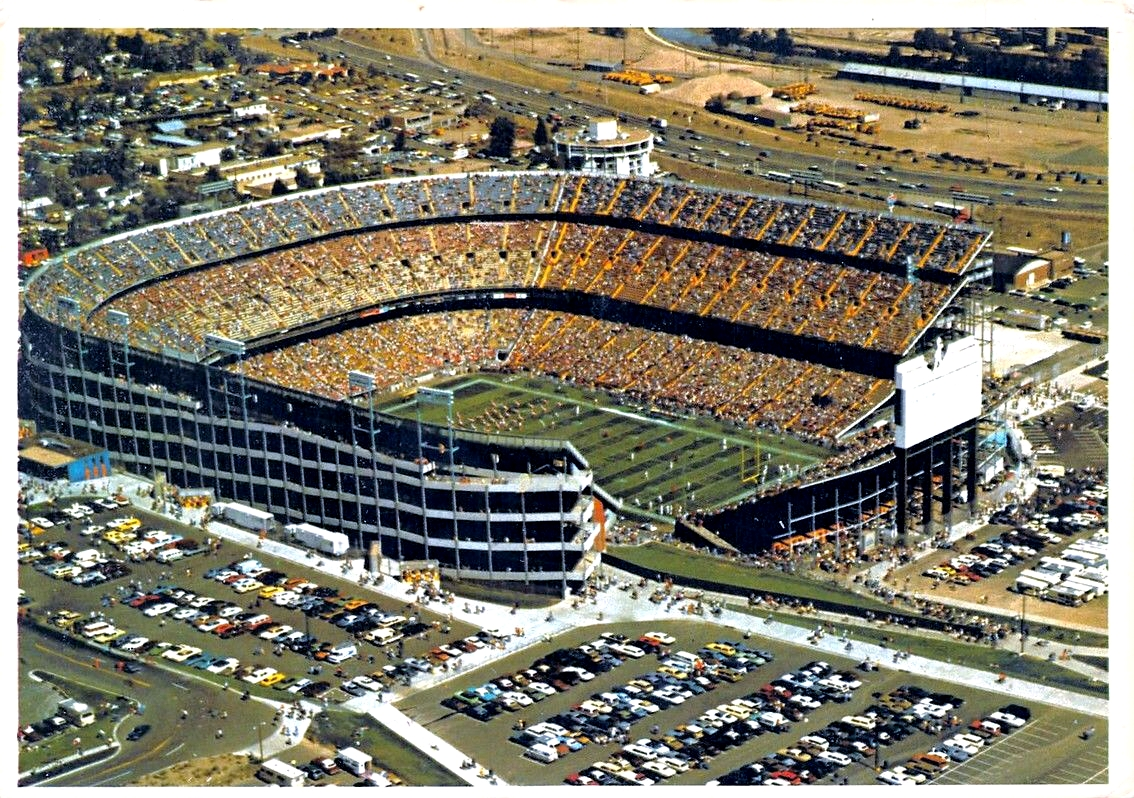
Denver Mile High Stadium postcard (c. 1970s-1980s)

=== 1980 to 1999 ===
- 1980
  - Population of the City & County: 492,365
    24th most populous US city.
- 1981
  - Nancy Leavitt with Denver Water coins the word Xeriscaping.
  - Quiznos restaurant in business.
- 1982
  - October 4: 16th Street Mall (pedestrian way) opens.
- 1983
  - April 4: Opening night for Otello, the first opera staged by Opera Colorado.
  - June 21: Federico Peña wins tight runoff election to become mayor.
- 1984
  - Children's Museum of Denver moves to new building on the Platte River Greenway.
  - Republic Plaza completed, becoming the tallest building in Denver.
  - Wings Over the Rockies Air and Space Museum (formerly The Lowry Heritage Museum) opened.
  - January 1: US West officially in business with headquarters in denver. It was separated from the AT&T as one of the "Baby Bells" as part of a 1982 antitrust case.
- 1985 – Denver Urban Gardens nonprofit and Avenue Theater established.
- 1986
  - Denver Enterprise Zone established by state legislature.
  - August 24: Frontier Airlines, a major Denver airline, goes bankrupt and shuts down.
- 1987
  - November 15: Continental Airlines Flight 1713 crashes on takeoff at Stapleton International Airport, killing twenty-five people, the deadliest accident in the airport's history.
- 1988
  - November 8: Scientific and Cultural Facilities District approved by voters of the metro area to provide money for museums and cultural programs.
  - Wynkoop Brewing Company in business, first craft brewery in Denver.
- 1989
  - Byers-Evans House Museum established.
  - Construction begins on new Denver International Airport.
  - March 25: Denver Symphony Orchestra has its last performance, going bankrupt and closes due to debt shortly afterwards.
  - October 26: Colorado Symphony Orchestra performs its first concert after being incorporated by musicians from the former organization.
- 1990
  - Population of the City & County: 492,365
    26th most populous US city.
  - Colorado Convention Center opens.
- 1991
  - Wellington Webb elected Mayor of Denver in upset election, going from 7% support to 58% by the end of the campaign.
  - Museo de las Americas founded.
  - National Renewable Energy Laboratory established near city.
- 1993
  - August – Catholic Pope John Paul II visits city for World Youth Day 1993.
  - Chipotle Mexican Grill opens first location on Evans Avenue.
  - 5280 magazine begins publication.
  - Molly Brown House restoration begins.
- 1994
  - Regional Transportation District starts light rail service.
  - July 5: Denver based Frontier Airlines begins operations.
  - September: Lowry Air Force Base closes with the land turned over to the nonprofit Lowry Redevelopment Authority.
- 1995
  - Coors Field opens.
  - Elitch Gardens moves to Platte River Valley location near downtown.
  - Qdoba Mexican Grill founded under the name Zuma restaurant.
  - First Fridays of the Golden Triangle Museum District begin.
  - February 28: Denver International Airport begins operating.
- 1996
  - June 10: Colorado Avalanche win first Stanley Cup title in franchise history in their inaugural season in Denver after relocating from Quebec.
- 1997
  - June: 23rd G8 summit held.
  - Denver Underground Film Festival begins.
  - Diana DeGette becomes U.S. representative for Colorado's 1st congressional district.
- 1998
  - January 25: Denver Broncos win Super Bowl XXXII, their first in franchise history.
  - December 20: Continental Airlines Flight 1404 crashes, resulting in no fatalities and the most severe incident in Denver International Airport's history.
- 1999
  - January 31: Denver Broncos win Super Bowl XXXIII, MVP John Elway's final game before retirement.
  - Pepsi Center arena opens.
  - Colorado's Ocean Journey aquarium opens.

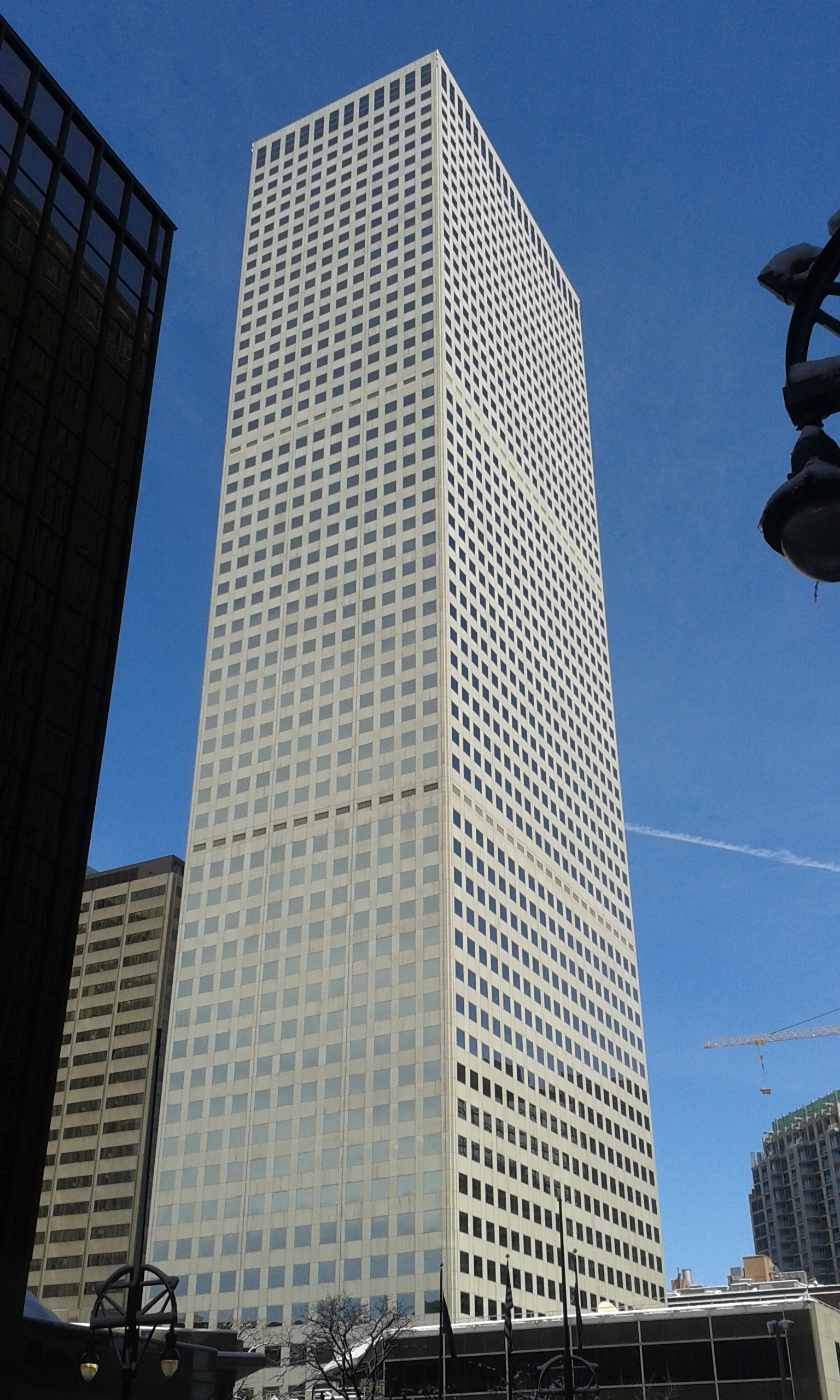
Republic Plaza is a skyscraper in Denver, Colorado. Rising 717 feet (219 m), the building currently stands as the tallest building in the city of Denver.

== 2000s ==
=== 2000s ===
- 2000
  - Population of the City & County: 554,636
    24th most populous US city.
- 2001
  - First Look Film Festival begins.
- 2002
  - June 8–July 2: The Hayman Fire breaks out, blanketing the Denver metro area with smoke and impacting Cheesman Reservoir.
- 2003 – John Hickenlooper is elected Mayor of Denver.
- 2005
  - Marijuana legalization.
- 2006
  - Colorado T-REX Project (TRansportation EXpansion) completed.
  - Telemundo Denver begins broadcasting.
- 2008
  - August 6–10: 66th World Science Fiction Convention held.
  - August 25–28: 2008 Democratic National Convention held.
  - Education News Colorado begins publication.
- 2009
  - February 27: The Rocky Mountain News publishes its last edition after almost 150 years of publication.

=== 2010s ===
- 2010
  - Population of the City & County: 600,158
    26th most populous US city
    Metro area: 2,543,482.
  - B-cycle bikeshare launched.
  - DaVita Inc. relocates to Denver.
- 2011
  - May 3: Denver mayoral election, 2011 held.
  - June 7: Michael Hancock wins the runoff in the 2011 Denver mayoral election.
  - Clyfford Still museum opens.
- 2012
  - April 28: New History Colorado Center opens.
  - June 15–17: Denver Comic Con begins.
- 2015
  - February 7: Denver Broncos win Super Bowl 50, their third championship.

=== 2020s ===
- 2020
  - Population of the City & County: 715,522
    19th most populous US city.
  - August 5: Diol-Beye family murders, where 5 members of a family died in an arson.
- 2021
  - December 27: A gunman goes on a shooting spree across the Denver metropolitan area, killing five including local artist Alicia Cardenas and injuring two before dying in a shootout with Lakewood police.
- 2023
  - June 6: Mike Johnston wins the runoff in the 2023 Denver mayoral election.
  - June 12: Denver Nuggets win first championship in franchise history after 47 years.

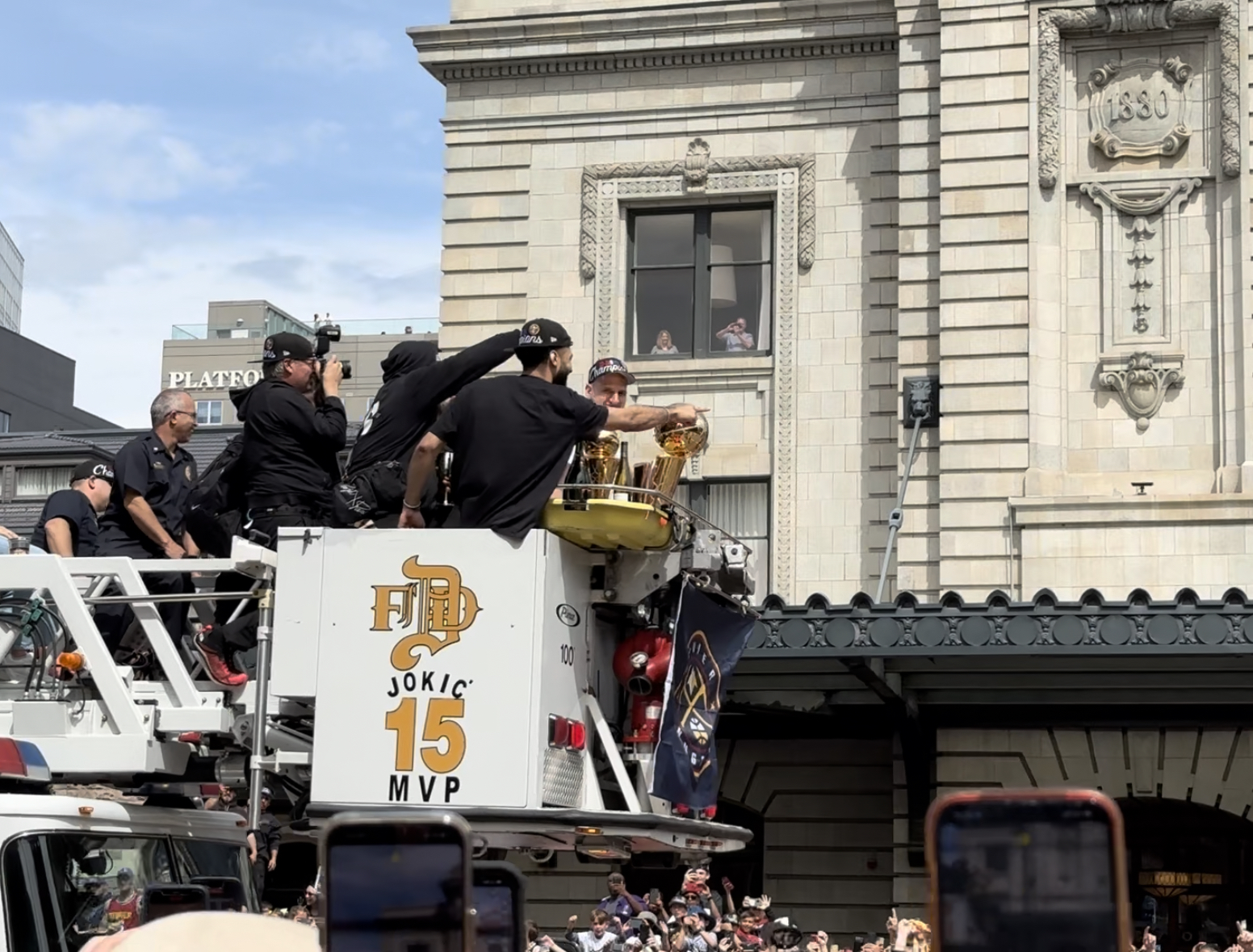
Jokić and Murray with the Larry O'Brien Championship Trophy

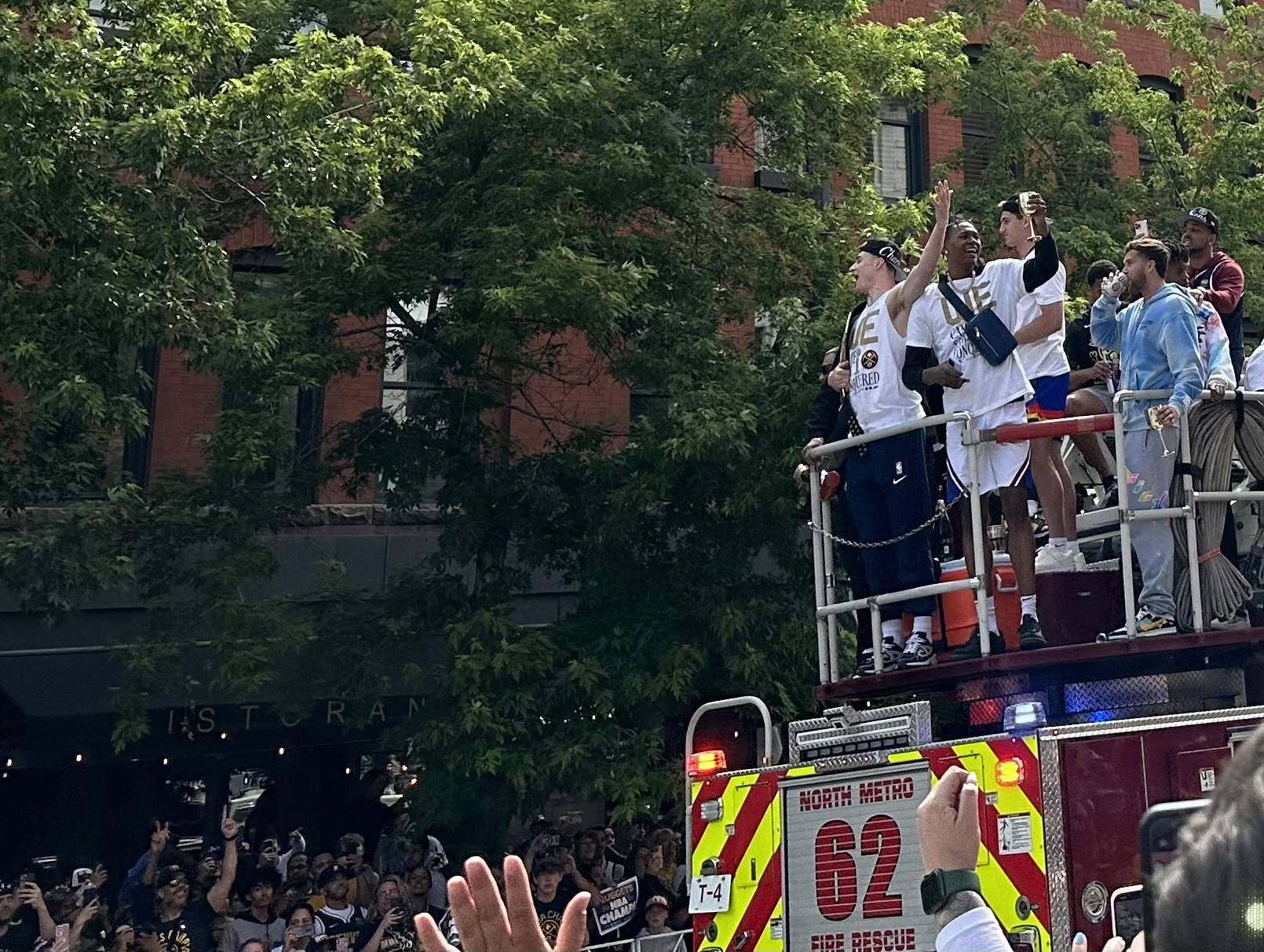
Nuggets players celebrating during parade

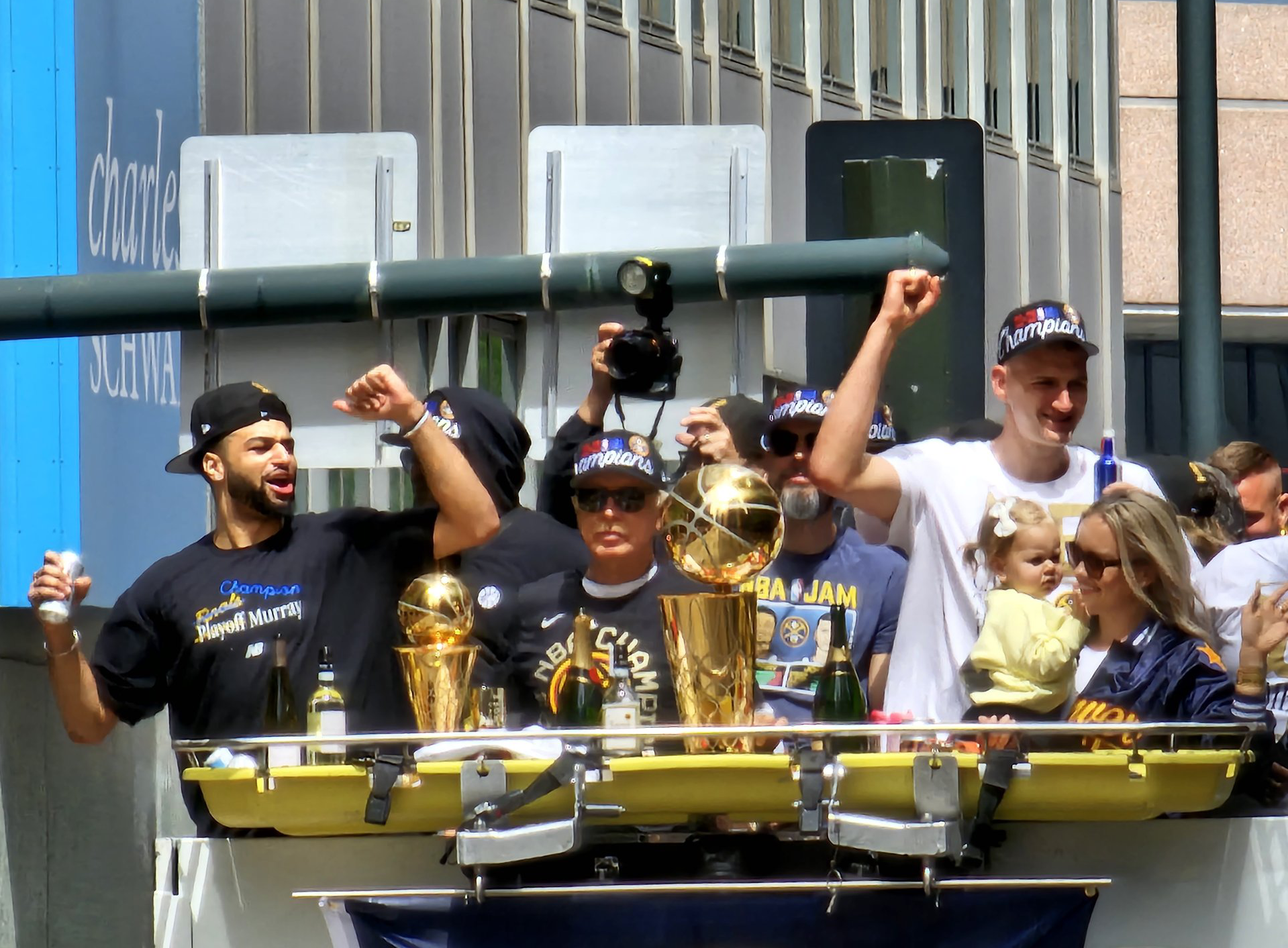
Denver Nuggets victory parade

== See also ==
- Bibliography of Colorado
- Geography of Colorado
- History of Colorado
  - History of Denver
- Index of Colorado-related articles
- List of Colorado-related lists
  - List of mayors of Denver
  - List of National Register of Historic Places in Denver
  - Timeline of Colorado history
    - Timeline of Aurora, Colorado
    - Timeline of Boulder, Colorado
    - Timeline of Colorado Springs, Colorado
    - Timeline of mining in Colorado
- Outline of Colorado
