= Timeline of Aurora, Colorado =

The following is a timeline of the history of the city of Aurora, Colorado, USA.

== Prior to 20th century ==
- 1890 – Settlement named "Fletcher."
- 1891
  - Fletcher incorporated as a town.
  - H.M. Miliken becomes mayor.
- 1892 – Schoolhouse burns down.
- 1893 – Denver-Fletcher trolley begins operating.

== 20th century ==
- 1902 – Section of town becomes part of Adams County; the other section becomes part of South Arapahoe County.
- 1906
  - Town Hall built.
  - Democrat-News begins publication.
- 1907
  - Fletcher renamed "Aurora."
  - First Presbyterian Church built.
- 1908 – Electricity begins operating.
- 1918 – US Army General Hospital No. 21 opens.
- 1924 – Colfax Avenue becomes part of U.S. Route 40.
- 1925
  - Aurora Woman's Club formed.
  - Hollywood cinema opens.
- 1929
  - Aurora Public Library established.
  - Stapleton Aerodrome begins operating near Aurora.
- 1938 – US military Lowry Technical Training Center built.
- 1939 – Population: 3,494.
- 1942 – US military Buckley Space Force Base built.
- 1946
  - Fox Theatre in business.
  - City Planning Commission established.
- 1949 – City Water Department established.
- 1950 – East 70 Drive-In cinema in business.
- 1954 – Hoffman Heights becomes part of Aurora.
- 1955 – Denver Regional Council of Governments formed.
- 1965 – Norma Walker becomes mayor.
- 1966 – Arapahoe Junior College opens.
- 1971
  - Buckingham Square Mall in business.
  - Camelot hi-rise offices built.
- 1972
  - Aurora Advocate Sentinel and Aurora Sun newspapers begin publication.
  - Little League baseball team formed.
- 1974 – Quincy Reservoir constructed.
- 1975 – Aurora Mall in business.
- 1979
  - Aurora History Museum founded.
  - Marketplace Tower I office building constructed.
- 1981 – Aurora Genealogical Society founded.
- 1982 – Aurora Public Library Central building constructed.
- 1984 – Bennett family murders
- 1985 – City Historic Preservation Commission established.
- 1990 – Population: 222,103.
- 1992 – Sister city relationship established with Seongnam, South Korea.
- 1993 – December 13: 1993 Aurora, Colorado shooting.
- 1994 – US Lowry Air Force Base closes.
- 1996
  - City website online (approximate date).
  - Arabian Horse Association headquartered in Aurora (approximate date).
- 1998 – Century cinema in business.

== 21st century ==
- 2003
  - Aurora Municipal Center built.
  - Ed Tauer becomes mayor.
- 2004 – Population: 298,303.
- 2007 – Children's Hospital Colorado opens.
- 2009 – Mike Coffman becomes U.S. representative for Colorado's 6th congressional district.
- 2010 – Population: 325,078.
- 2011
  - Steve Hogan becomes mayor.
  - Colorado's 6th congressional district remapped.
- 2012 – July 20: 2012 Aurora, Colorado shooting.
- 2014 – Sister city relationship established with Adama, Ethiopia.
- 2017 – May 15: The Republic of El Salvador opens a consulate in Aurora, the city's first.
- 2018 – Mayor Steve Hogan dies in office.
- 2022 – A shooting at Iglesia Faro De Luz Church in Aurora kills at least one, a woman, and injures two others.

== See also ==
- Bibliography of Colorado
- Geography of Colorado
- History of Colorado
  - History of Aurora
- Index of Colorado-related articles
- List of Colorado-related lists
  - List of National Register of Historic Places in Adams County, Colorado
  - List of National Register of Historic Places in Arapahoe County, Colorado
  - Timeline of Colorado history
    - Timeline of Boulder, Colorado
    - Timeline of Colorado Springs, Colorado
    - Timeline of Denver
    - Timeline of mining in Colorado
- Outline of Colorado

== Bibliography ==
- McFadden. Early Aurora. 1978.
- Ory Mazar Nergal, ed. (1980), "Aurora, Colorado", Encyclopedia of American Cities, New York: E.P. Dutton, OL 4120668M
- Steven F. Mehls; et al. (1985). Aurora: Gateway to the Rockies. Cordillera Press. ISBN 978-0-917895-05-0.
- Sherah J. Collins (2008). Aurora. Arcadia Publishing. ISBN 978-0-7385-4824-1.
- "Trying to Shine in the Shadow of a Neighbor", New York Times, December 12, 2011
- Historitecture LLC (2015), Guide to the City of Aurora's Historic Architecture – via History Colorado
