= DRCOG =

DRCOG may refer to either:

- Denver Regional Council of Governments
- DObst RCOG, Diploma of the Royal College of Obstetricians and Gynaecologists
