= Ruth Cave Flowers =

American lawyer

Ruth Cave Flowers (1903–1980) was one of the first African American female graduates from the University of Colorado (CU). Described by former colleague Dorothy Rupert as having an “infectious love of learning”, Flowers was a lawyer and educator who taught at several high schools and colleges across the country.

== Early life ==
Ruth Cave Flowers was born in Colorado Springs, Colorado on March 10, 1903. Her parents had divorced before her birth and she was abandoned by her father. After her mother died when she was only 10 or 11, she went to live with her grandmother, Minnesota Waters, and her sister, Dorothy, in Cripple Creek, Colorado. She describes her four years in Cripple Creek as "some of the happiest in her life" as she and her sister never suffered any racial discrimination there. They would first encounter racial discrimination when they moved to Boulder, Colorado in 1917. Flowers believed the racism stemmed from patients who came to Boulder from southern states for its health facilities and ended up taking over local businesses and the University of Colorado.

Flowers and her family moved to Boulder for its educational opportunities. They first rented a house on Water St. and then, in 1921, they built their own house at 2019 Goss Street (now a city landmark) in the “little rectangle” area. She attended the State Preparatory School (later known as Boulder High School). While attending high school she worked in a laundry and restaurant to support her family. She graduated in 1920 but the principal, an avowed racist, refused to grant her a diploma due to her race (he claimed it was because of a missing assignment that Flowers knew she had completed).

Even without a high school diploma Flowers was admitted to the University of Colorado since she had obtained the required high school credits. She majored in foreign language. CU President George Norlin, an opponent of the Ku Klux Klan, provided her with a job laundering clothes to help her stay in school. She was long thought to be the first African American female CU graduate until it was discovered that that distinction belonged to Lucile Buchanan. Unlike Buchanan, Flowers was allowed to walk at her graduation in 1924, although she was denied food service on campus.

== Career ==
After graduating from CU Flowers was unable to find a job in the West because of discrimination. She found a position teaching language at Claflin College in South Carolina and worked there from 1924-1928.

Flowers returned to Boulder every summer and in 1929 or 1930 obtained an MA in French and Education from CU while caring for her grandmother. Next she moved to Washington, D.C. where she taught at Dunbar High School (1931-1945) and started attending Robert F. Terrell law school at night in 1935, obtaining her law degree in 1945.

Flowers and her then-husband opened a law office and practiced law together for a few years. She returned to school and in 1951 obtained a PhD in foreign languages and literature from Catholic University of America in Washington.

Flowers next worked from 1951 to 1959 as an associate professor at North Carolina College in Durham (now North Carolina Central University).

Flowers returned to her home in Boulder in 1959 after spending a year in Spain and took a position as head of the foreign language department at Fairview High School which she held until she retired in 1967. She was the first African American teacher in the Boulder Valley School District.

Flowers also taught an African American literature course in the Black Studies program at the University of Colorado from 1970-1971.

Flowers was finally awarded a diploma from Boulder High School in 1977 while giving the commencement address. She was selected by Harvard University as one of four outstanding teachers in America. She once said, "I really want to see a time when we won't have to be concerned with black awareness, brown awareness, women's rights, or whatever, but simply human rights and human awareness."

== Family ==
Flowers married Harold Flowers in 1937 and they divorced in 1949. Their son, Harold "Sonny" Flowers, Jr., obtained a bachelor's and law degree from CU and worked as an attorney. He died July 29, 2020, at age 74.

Ruth Cave Flowers died on November 20, 1980.
