= KGNU =

Radio station in Denver, Colorado

KGNU and KGNU-FM

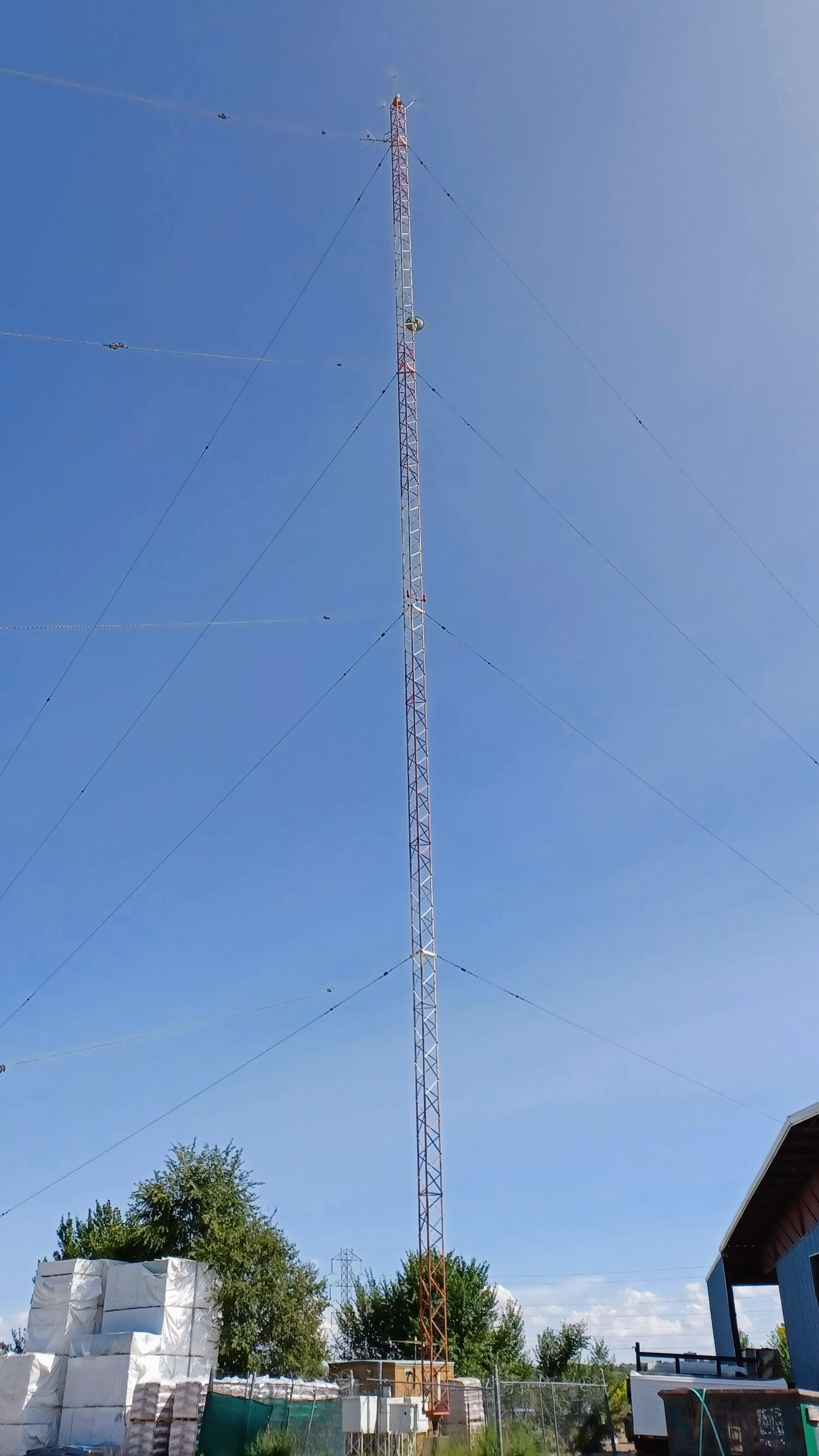
- KGNU's broadcast tower in Englewood, Colorado

KGNU: Denver, Colorado; KGNU-FM: Boulder, Colorado; United States
- Broadcast area: Denver-Boulder-Longmont
- Frequencies: KGNU: 1390 kHz; KGNU-FM: 88.5 MHz (HD Radio)
- Branding: KGNU Community Radio

Programming
- Format: Community Radio
- Affiliations: BBC World Service; Pacifica Radio; PRX

Ownership
- Owner: Boulder Community Broadcast Association, Inc.

History
- First air date: KGNU: 1956; KGNU-FM: May 24, 1978
- Former call signs: KGNU: KFML (1956–1982); KJJZ (1982–1984); KPPL (1984–1987); KMDK (1987–1988); KFTO (1988); KDZR (1988–1989); KJME (1989–2004)

Technical information
- Licensing authority: FCC
- Facility ID: KGNU: 31349; KGNU-FM: 6512
- Class: KGNU: D; KGNU-FM: A
- Power: KGNU: 5,000 watts (day); 139 watts (night)
- ERP: KGNU-FM: 4,000 watts
- HAAT: KGNU-FM: 65 meters (213 ft)
- Transmitter coordinates: KGNU: 39°39′29.0″N 105°0′50.9″W; KGNU-FM: 40°5′57″N 104°54′3.2″W
- Translator(s): (98.7 MHz) K254CH (Fort Collins); (99.1 MHz) K256CT (Denver)

Links
- Public license information: KGNU: Public file; LMS; KGNU-FM: Public file; LMS
- Website: kgnu.org

KGNU (1390 AM) & KGNU-FM (88.5 FM) are a pair of community radio stations licensed to Denver and Boulder, Colorado respectively. KGNU is owned by Boulder Community Broadcast Association, Inc.

== History ==
=== KFML ===
1390 AM was first licensed on April 4, 1956, and held the call sign KFML. It aired a classical music format and was simulcast on 98.5 KFML-FM. It originally ran 1,000 watts during daytime hours only and was owned by Evert A. Bancker Jr. In 1961, the station was sold to the Fine Arts Broadcasting Company, along with its FM sister station, for $118,720. Its power was increased to 5,000 watts in 1964. In 1966, it was sold, along with its FM sister station, to O'Fallon–O'Connor Broadcasting Inc. for $165,000. In 1969, controlling interest was sold to Joseph R. McGoey for $96,250.

In 1971, KFML adopted a progressive rock format. In 1975, the station was sold to Radio Denver Corp. for $200,000.

=== Golden Bear Communications ownership ===
In 1982, the station was sold to Golden Bear Communications for $760,000. The station adopted a jazz format, and its call sign was changed to KJJZ. In 1984, the station's call sign was changed to KPPL and it adopted an urban contemporary format. On July 31, 1985, Golden Bear Communications filed for Chapter 11 bankruptcy and on October 10, 1985, the proceeding was converted to Chapter 7.

=== KMDK ===
In 1987, the station was sold to Huttner Health Network for $265,000. Its call sign was changed to KMDK, and it began airing a health-talk format branded "K-Medic".

=== KDZR ===
On June 13, 1988, its call sign was changed to KFTO, and on June 23, 1988, its call sign was changed to KDZR. As KDZR, the station was initially an affiliate of Z Rock, airing a heavy metal/hard rock format. On November 14, 1988, it adopted a business talk format and became an affiliate of the Business Radio Network.

=== KJME ===
In 1989, the station's call sign was changed to KJME and it began airing a Spanish language format. In 1990, KJME was sold to Jo-Mor Communications for $350,000. In 1991, the station was fined $5,000 for operating at 450% in excess of its licensed power.

=== KGNU ===
KGNU-FM began broadcasting May 24, 1978 from a one-room cottage along Boulder Creek. In 2004, Boulder Community Broadcast Association purchased AM 1390 KJME in Denver for $4.1 million, and its call sign was changed to KGNU.

KGNU's programming follows a variety radio format, featuring a mix of music, news and information. Local shows are hosted by volunteers. The station also carries syndicated programs distributed by Public Radio International, Pacifica Radio and BBC World Service. KGNU is a member of the Grassroots Radio Coalition, which it helped found in 1996.

In 2001, KGNU moved from its Folsom location to a building it purchased at 4700 Walnut St. by Foothills Parkway.

In 2018, the station's 40th anniversary was commemorated by a six-week exhibit, "Listening Together", at the Museum of Boulder. Beginning in 2019, the station embarked on a capital campaign to raise $1.25M, with an equal amount to be matched by the City of Boulder, as part of the voter-approved 2017 Community, Culture and Safety Tax.

On May 22, 2026, KGNU opened new facilities on 14th Street in downtown Boulder.

== Transmission facilities ==
In the summer of 2010, KGNU-FM was granted permission to increase its FM transmitter power to 4,000 watts ERP. KGNU (AM) operates at 5,000 watts by day but must reduce power to 139 watts at night to protect other radio stations on 1390 kHz. The AM transmitter is in Englewood, Colorado off South Wyandot Street. The FM transmitter is in Louisville, Colorado near the Louisville Reservoir, on a tower 213 feet (65 meters) HAAT. KGNU also operates a 28-watt FM translator K229AC at 93.7 MHz in Nederland, Colorado, and a 7-watt FM translator K254CH licensed to Laporte, Colorado, which simulcasts KGNU-FM on 98.7 MHz from Horsetooth Mountain west of Fort Collins.

== See also ==
- List of community radio stations in the United States
