= Banjo Billy's Bus Tours =

Tour bus company

Banjo Billy's Bus Tours was a tour bus company based in Boulder, Colorado and Denver operating guided tours in the local area. The company gained attention for its history and ghost tours on a log cabin bus.

== History ==
The company was founded in 2005 by John Georgis, a Colorado native and former salesperson. Georgis purchased a school bus on eBay, refurbished the exterior with wood planks and the interior with couches, recliners and saddles, and began running tours in Boulder as Banjo Billy’s Bus Tours. In 2007, Banjo Billy’s Bus Tours expanded to Denver. In 2015, Glenn Locke, a tour guide, acquired the company. Because of the COVID-19 pandemic the company closed down in 2020. In 2025, Glenn Locke returned as Banjo Billy to offer guided walking tours, sponsored by the Museum of Boulder.

== Tour options ==
The tour buses, also called 'traveling hillbilly shacks,' offered guided tours blending history, crime anecdotes, and humor. The tours covered points of interest in downtown Denver and Boulder, with ghost tours provided in October. Additionally, Denver hosts regular brewery tours, with extra tours and stops during the Great American Beer Festival.
