= Lucile Buchanan =

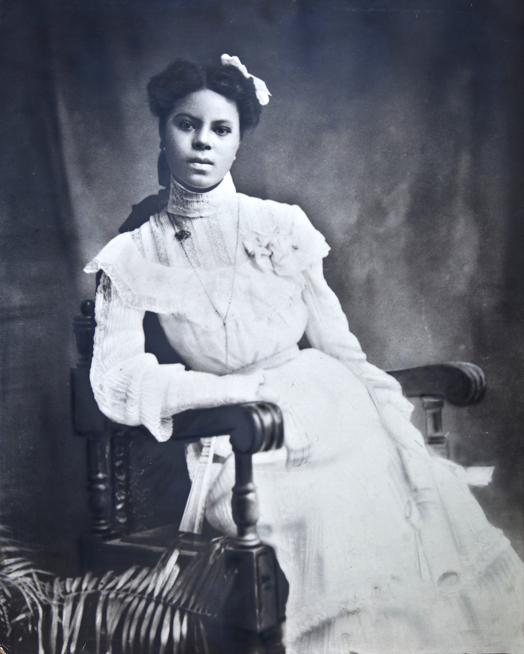
- Born: June 13, 1884; Denver, Colorado
- Died: November 13, 1989 (aged 105); Denver, Colorado
- Known for: First black woman to graduate from CU Boulder

Academic background
- Education: B.A., University of Colorado Boulder

Lucile Berkeley Buchanan Jones (1884–1989) was the first black woman to graduate from the University of Colorado Boulder. She graduated with a degree in German in 1918.

The Lucile Berkeley Buchanan Scholarship was created in her honor in April, 2010. Buchanan Jones is remembered for her "fierce independence, tenacity, and resolve".

== Early life ==
Lucy Berkeley Buchanan was born on June 13, 1884, to Sarah Lavina Bishop Buchanan and James Fenton Buchanan. Both of her parents had been born into slavery on Virginia plantations. Buchanan Jones claimed—and other evidence suggests—that Edmund Berkeley, the white slave owner of Sarah Bishop's plantation, was Sarah Bishop's father and Buchanan Jones's grandfather. “Lucy” was the name of one of Edmund Berkeley's white daughters. “Berkeley,” Lucy's middle name, followed a Virginia tradition of naming a child after a parent or grandparent. Buchanan Jones later unofficially changed her name from Lucy to Lucile.

In November 1872, Buchanan Jones's parents married in Virginia. While still living in Virginia Sarah Bishop Buchanan gave birth to a daughter who died shortly after birth, and then to Hattie, Hannah, Laura, and her only son Fenton Mercer.

The Buchanans moved to Denver, Colorado in May 1882. They were the first black family to own property in the Barnum subdivision. However, they did not move to Barnum until between 1886 and 1888 because of a lack of water, roads, transportation, postal service, churches, physicians, and shops. The Buchanans constructed a five bedroom Queen Anne style house on the land which was still standing in 2018.

Lucy Berkeley Buchanan was the Buchanans’ first child born in Colorado. Four more children were born in Colorado: Sadie, Edith, Nellie and Claribel.

== Education and career ==
Buchanan Jones graduated from Villa Park High School in June 1901. Following graduation she briefly worked as a substitute teacher at the high school, then for a publishing company and as a bookkeeper.

Buchanan enrolled in a two-year teacher certification program at the now University of Northern Colorado in 1903 (then the Colorado State College for Education at Greeley). She was the only black student in her 1905 graduating class and was the first black student to earn a normal (teaching) degree there.

After graduating from UNC Buchanan Jones unsuccessfully tried to get a teaching job in Colorado. She applied for a teaching job in Denver in 1908 but was again unsuccessful. She took a teaching job at Arkansas Baptist College in Little Rock. Then taught at Langston High School, the only black high school in Hot Springs, Arkansas, between 1912 and 1915.

The following year, Buchanan enrolled at the University of Chicago to study Greek, German, and English, where she studied for a year before pursuing a degree in German at the University of Colorado Boulder. Buchanan was fluent in German and read Latin.

Buchanan Jones was the University of Colorado Boulder's first black female graduate in 1918. Although the classrooms at the University were integrated, school officials apparently did not want her to walk on stage to receive her diploma at the graduation ceremony in June 1918. A woman was sent to her while she was sitting and waiting for her name to be called and told her “I’ll be your partner, Lucy”, then handed Buchanan Jones her diploma and disappeared. Buchanan Jones never went onstage at her own graduation ceremony. She vowed never to return to the University of Colorado, and never did.

She was not pictured in the university's yearbook in 1918, however she was pictured in a 1918 edition of The Crisis, an official magazine of the NAACP. The university posthumously honored her on May 10, 2018, when Polly E. Bugros McLean accepted a diploma on Buchanan's behalf. McLean, an associate professor of media studies at the university, wrote a book about Buchanan titled Remembering Lucile: A Virginia Family's Rise from Slavery and a Legacy Forged a Mile High, published in May 2018.

In 1919 Buchanan Jones took a position teaching English at the all-black Lincoln High School in Kansas City. There she enjoyed attending baseball games and was one of the advisers for the local Junior Branch of the NAACP. She created the World News Club for her students to discuss international events. In 1925 she created the school's first newspaper, the Observer. A student of hers who worked on the paper, Lucile Bluford, became one of the most highly recognized and respected journalists in Missouri as well as a leading voice in the civil rights movement.

Buchanan Jones returned to Chicago in 1925 and obtained a teaching position at the Stephen A. Douglas School. She spent the next 24 years teaching in the Chicago Public School System. During that period she enhanced her teaching skills by taking classes at the University of Chicago and the University of Denver. She retired in 1949 at age 65, the mandatory retirement age for teachers.

== Marriage and personal life ==
Lucile Buchanan married John Dotha Jones in October 1926. Jones, who already had a degree from Columbia University and had enrolled in the graduate program at the University of Chicago, obtained employment at the US Postal Service. Their marriage eventually fell apart and Jones left without notice on December 1, 1935. Buchanan Jones filed for a divorce which was granted in April 1940 on the grounds of adultery, extreme and repeated cruelty, willful desertion, and habitual drunkenness. Nevertheless, Buchanan Jones continued to use her married name “Mrs. Jones” 46 years after the divorce.

The shoes that she wore for her wedding, made by the Louvre Boot Company in Kansas City, Missouri, are at the Museum of Boulder.

With deep Baptist roots, Buchanan Jones became the first recording secretary of the National Convention of Gospel Choirs and Choruses.

Buchanan Jones was a lifelong Republican, as were her parents and most black Americans at the time. She cast her first vote for president in November 1920 and voted in 14 presidential elections. She felt strongly that voting and freedom were tied together.

== Later life and death ==
Following her retirement in 1949 Buchanan Jones returned to live in her family home in Denver with her brother Fenton. After Fenton died in 1963 a neighbor and friend of Fenton's, Herman Dick, became her driver and personal assistant. Later in life Buchanan Jones's eyesight and overall health deteriorated. In 1986 she was placed under the jurisdiction of the Colorado Department of Human Services, and on March 3 of that year, was physically restrained, removed from her home and taken to the Stovall Care Center. She would never return home again. She died on November 10, 1989, at age 105. She was initially buried in an unmarked grave. Fred Walsen, a history buff, read about Buchanan Jones's burial in the Rocky Mountain News and arranged to have her name added to her tombstone in 1998.
