= Citizens Project =

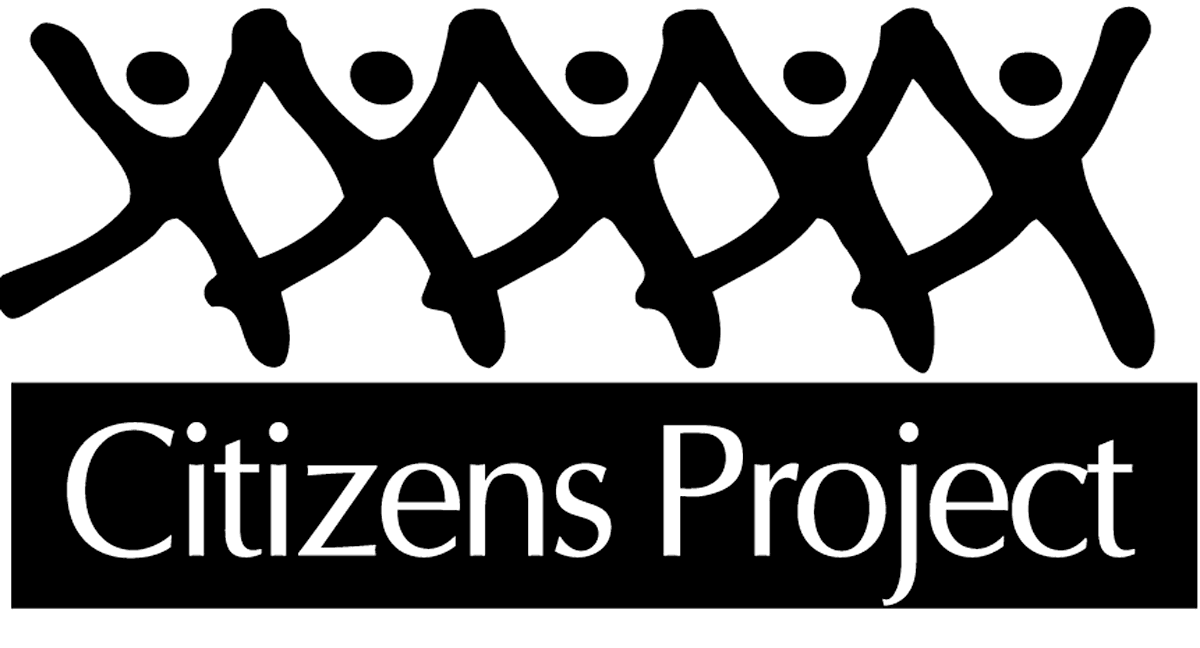
- Citizens Project black logo
- Founded: 1992
- Type: Nonprofit organization
- Legal status: 501(c)3
- Headquarters: Colorado Springs, Colorado
- Region served: El Paso county
- Executive Director: Jessica Delos Reyes
- Staff: 4
- Website: CitizensProject.org

Citizens Project is a Colorado Springs-based non-profit organization that "...empowers the people of Colorado Springs to create a city that is equitable, just, and inclusive through civic engagement, voter education, and local advocacy." The founding of Citizens Project was pushed by founders' growing concerns about the increased encroachment of overt religious influence in public schools and the passage of Amendment 2, which legalized the discrimination of LGBTQIA people in Colorado.

In early 2010, Citizens Project began a campaign in which billboards and bus ads directed people to go to one of four websites: CelebrateConformity.com, ChurchEqualsState.com, CreateIsolation.com, and FreedomFromExpression.com. Citizens Project, in March, revealed that it was them behind the campaign, hoping that "the campaign [would] start a dialogue about cultural and religious diversity in our community."

Citizens Project also published a yearly Voters Guide in the Colorado Springs Independent. They campaigned for a "Plus One" initiative in Colorado Springs, which was ultimately defeated due to city budget cuts. Citizens Project was also at the forefront of the reestablishment of a Human Relations Commission in Colorado Springs.
