= Museum of Boulder =

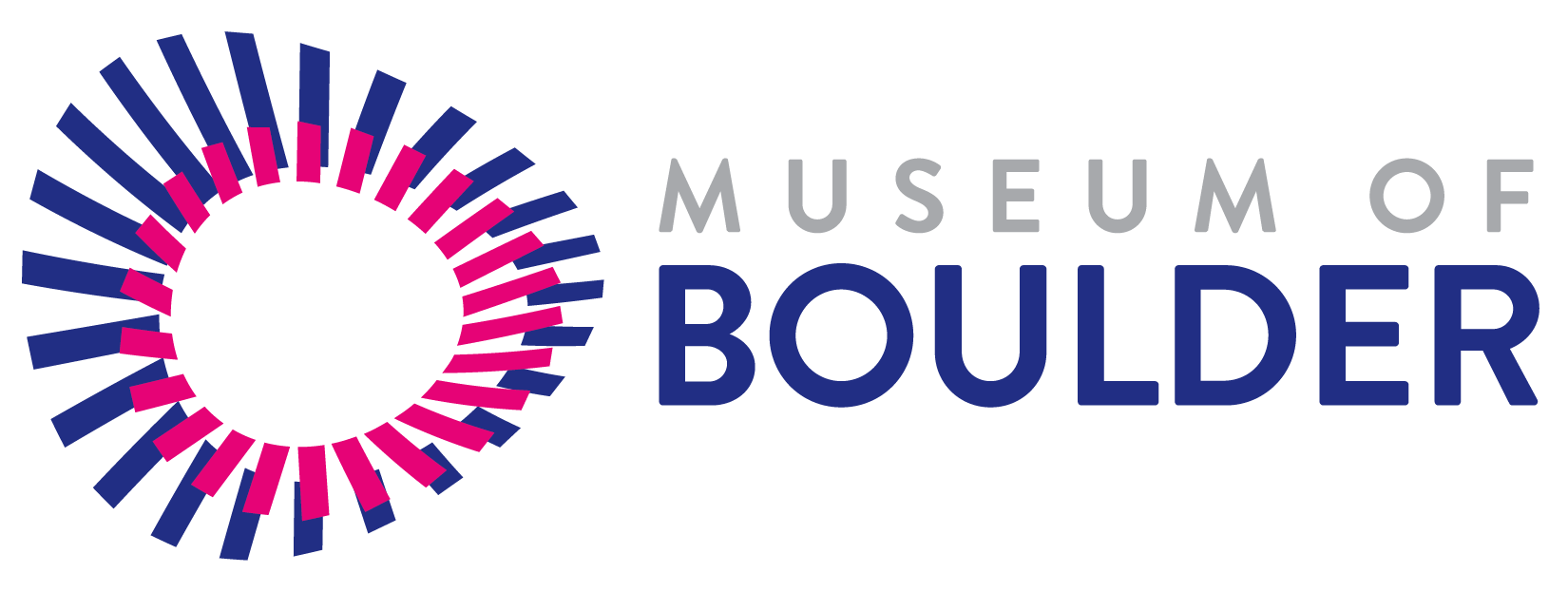
- Former name: Boulder History Museum
- Established: 1944; 82 years ago
- Location: 2205 Broadway; Boulder, Colorado (United States)
- Coordinates: 40.0051°N 105.2771°W
- Type: History museum
- CEO: Lori Preston
- Website: museumofboulder.org

The Museum of Boulder, formerly the Boulder History Museum, is a private, nonprofit, local history museum located in Boulder, Colorado and operated by the Boulder Historical Society. From 1985 to 2018, the Museum operated out of the historic Harbeck-Bergheim house on University Hill near the University of Colorado Boulder campus. In April 2013, it purchased the Masonic Lodge building at Broadway and Pine for $2.45 million. Renovations began in 2017 and the new Museum opened on May 19, 2018.

In 2015 the Boettcher Foundation granted the museum $75,000 to renovate the former Masonic Lodge building. In addition, the museum received a $500,000 challenge grant from the National Endowment for the Humanities to help aid in renovations. Voters approved, in 2014, $4 million as part of the Community, Culture and Safety Tax. In October 2017, Stephen Tebo donated $1.5 million to the Museum of Boulder, allowing him the opportunity to name the new museum building.

The Museum of Boulder works in conjunction with the Boulder Carnegie Library in order to preserve over 900,000 historic photographs and documents. The museum also has a collection of over 45,000 historical artifacts.
