= Denver Regional Council of Governments =

A map showing counties included in the Denver Regional Council of Governments

The Denver Regional Council of Governments (DRCOG, /ˈdɒktər.kɔːɡ/) is a nonprofit membership organization of local governments in the Denver region of the US state of Colorado. DRCOG is the designated metropolitan planning organization (MPO) and the Transportation Planning Region (TPR) for the region, as well as the Area Agency on Aging (AAA).

== Extent ==
DRCOG covers a region that includes Adams, Arapahoe, Boulder, Broomfield, Clear Creek, Denver, Douglas, Gilpin, and Jefferson counties and the southwest portion of Weld County.

Denver Regional Council of Governments
| County | 2010 Census | 2000 Census | Pop Change |
|---|---|---|---|
| Adams | 441,603 | 363,857 | +21.37% |
| Arapahoe | 572,003 | 487,967 | +17.22% |
| Boulder | 294,567 | 291,288 | +1.13% |
| Broomfield | 55,889 | 55,889 | 0.00% |
| Clear Creek | 9,088 | 9,322 | −2.51% |
| Denver | 600,158 | 554,636 | +8.21% |
| Douglas | 285,465 | 175,766 | +62.41% |
| Gilpin | 5,441 | 4,757 | +14.38% |
| Jefferson | 534,543 | 527,056 | +1.42% |
| Total | 2,798,757 | 2,414,649 | +15.91% |

== History and Organization ==
The predecessor to DRCOG, the Inter-County Regional Planning Commission, was formed in April, 1955 by Adams, Arapahoe, Denver, and Jefferson Counties to make plans for future growth in the region. In 1968 it was replaced by DRCOG. It brings a regional perspective to discussions about the metro area's problems and to address those concerns through cooperative local-government action. The voluntary association continues to offer opportunities for local officials to work together on regional issues such as growth and development, transportation, the environment, water quality, and older adult services.

More than 50 metro-area county and municipal governments are members of DRCOG. Each jurisdiction appoints a representative to the DRCOG Board of Directors. The Board is composed of elected officials (county commissioners, mayors, city council, or town board members), as well as three nonvoting members designated by Colorado's governor. Board officers serve one-year terms starting each February. The Board meets monthly to discuss and act on regional issues. The Board allows time for public comment at each meeting and holds regular Public hearings.

A number of standing committees also meet regularly, and ad-hoc committees are convened as necessary.

== Program Areas ==
DRCOG's primary program areas include:

- Regional planning: DRCOG is the regional planning commission for the Denver metro area. Since its creation DRCOG has prepared regional plans. Metro Vision is the region's current plan to guide growth, transportation, and environmental quality to 2035. Metro Vision, first adopted in 1997, is the foundation of the regional council's long-range planning activities. The Mile High Compact is a voluntary intergovernmental agreement through which local governments manage growth by adhering to Metro Vision principles. A number of planning awards have recognized Metro Vision and the Mile High Compact.
- Regional data and maps: DRCOG produces a variety of information to support the planning and policy decisions that shape the region including mapping; population, housing, and economic estimates; environmental data; etc. DRCOG collaborates with its member governments and other public-sector entities to routinely produce digital aerial photography for the region.
- Transportation planning: As the region's MPO, DRCOG works with the Colorado Department of Transportation (CDOT), the Regional Transportation District, the Regional Air Quality Council, and others to prepare transportation plans and programs and to monitor transportation effects on air quality. DRCOG serves as the TPR in developing plans for the mountains and plains areas of the region. DRCOG also performs traffic signal coordination, travel forecasting, etc.
- Transportation demand management: Since 1975, DRCOG has offered Denver metro area residents commuting assistance. From its genesis as a carpool matching service DRCOG's services now include carpool and vanpool matching, school carpool matching, teleworking assistance, and other alternative transportation programs to help commuters avoid traffic congestion, all of which may help reduce pollution. In 2008 DRCOG won a creative excellence award from the Association for Commuter Transportation for a targeted telework business assistance program.
- Area Agency on Aging: DRCOG plans and coordinates a continuum of services available to older adults living in the Denver metro area (excluding Boulder County and southwest Weld County). DRCOG assesses the needs of the region's seniors and develops strategies to meet those needs while allocating federal Older Americans Act funds to service providers in the region. The Ombudsman Program works to serve the needs and protect the rights and dignity of residents of the region's long-term care facilities such as nursing homes and assisted living facilities.
- Water Quality: DRCOG was undesignated as the regional water quality planning agency by Governor John Hickenlooper in February 2011. Prior to that date State and federal statutes gave DRCOG responsibility for regional water quality planning (except for southwest Weld County). DRCOG oversaw all regional water quality issues dealing with rivers, streams, lakes, reservoirs, wetlands, and groundwater systems. Regional issues include watershed quality trends, standards and classifications, wastewater treatment and disposal practices, groundwater quality, recharge zones, land use patterns, wetland protection, non-point source pollution, storm water runoff, urban lakes, water supply, and other environmental constraints.
- Transit-Oriented Development: Since the passage of FasTracks, DRCOG has served as a resource for the region as it plans for and implements transit-oriented development (TOD). TODs are pedestrian-friendly mixed-use developments, located within a half-mile (0.80 km) of a transit stop. They are designed to allow residents and workers to drive their cars less and ride transit more.

== See also ==
- Colorado census statistical areas
- Colorado Department of Transportation
- Colorado metropolitan areas
- Metropolitan planning organization
- Colorado
