= Baby Doe Tabor =

American pioneer (1854–1935)

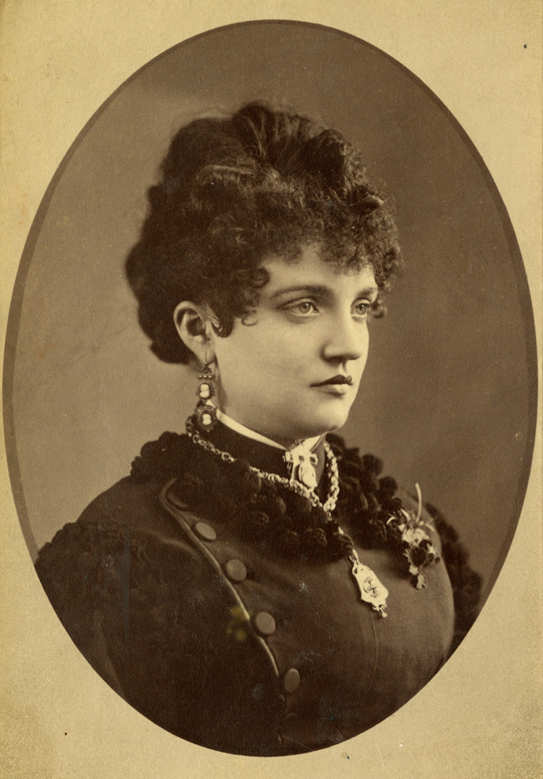
Baby Doe Tabor, circa 1883

Elizabeth McCourt Tabor (September 1854 – March 7, 1935), better known as Baby Doe, was the second wife of Colorado pioneer businessman Horace Tabor. Her rags-to-riches and back to rags again story made her a well-known figure in her own day, and inspired an opera and a Hollywood movie based on her life.

Born in Oshkosh, Wisconsin to Peter McCourt, she moved to Colorado in the mid-1870s with her first husband, Harvey Doe, whom she divorced for drinking, gambling, frequenting brothels, and being unable to provide a living.

She then moved to Leadville, Colorado, where she met Horace Tabor, a wealthy silver magnate almost twice her age. In 1883, he divorced his first wife, Augusta Tabor, to whom he had been married for 25 years, and married Baby Doe in Washington, D.C., during his brief stint as a US senator. They then took up residence in Denver. His divorce and remarriage to the young and beautiful Baby Doe caused a scandal in 1880s Colorado. Although Tabor was one of the wealthiest men in Colorado, and supported his wife in a lavish style, he lost his fortune when the repeal of the Sherman Silver Purchase Act caused the Panic of 1893, resulting in widespread bankruptcies in silver-producing regions such as Colorado. He died destitute, and Baby Doe returned to Leadville with her two daughters, living out the rest of her life there.

Once known as the "best dressed woman in the West," she lived in poverty and solitude for the last three decades of her life in a shack on the site of the Matchless Mine. She was found frozen in her cabin, aged about 81 years, after a snowstorm in March 1935. During her lifetime she was the subject of malicious gossip and scandal, defied Victorian gender values, and gained a reputation as "one of the most beautiful, flamboyant, and alluring women in the mining West." Her story inspired the opera The Ballad of Baby Doe.

== Early life and marriage ==
Elizabeth Bonduel McCourt was born in September 1854 in Oshkosh, Wisconsin, to Irish-Catholic immigrants Elizabeth Anderson Neilis and Peter McCourt. She later claimed to have been born in 1860 but appears on the 1860 Oshkosh census at 6 years of age. Born in September, according to the 1900 census, she appears to have been christened on October 7, 1854, at St. Peter's Catholic Church. Called Lizzie as a child, the fourth of eleven children, she grew up in a middle-class family in a two-story house. Her father was a partner in a local clothing store and owner of Oshkosh's first theater, McCourt Hall. Her mother fostered in her beautiful daughter the belief that her looks were of great worth, excusing her from domestic chores so as to preserve her skin and allowing her to dream of a future as an actress. Concerned by his wife's indulgence in their young and striking daughter, Peter McCourt thought it prudent to put her to work at the clothing store, where she was often in the company of fashionable young men. At age 16, she was a "fashionably plump" blond-haired young woman with a hectic social schedule.

Oshkosh was a frontier lumber town, filled with mills. When fires raged through Oshkosh in 1874 and again in 1875, the McCourts lost their home, the clothing store, and the theater. They mortgaged their property to rebuild the home and the business, but this put Peter McCourt deeply in debt. The family was forced to live on what amounted to little more than a clerk's salary.

In 1876, Lizzie McCourt met William Harvey Doe Jr., who was a Protestant. She enchanted him when, as the only woman competitor, she entered and won a skating competition, while at the same time scandalizing many of the townspeople by wearing a costume that showed glimpses of her legs. Lizzy and Harvey were married on June 27, 1877 at St. Peter's Catholic Church in Oshkosh, to the dissatisfaction of his parents. They then traveled with Harvey's father to Colorado to look after his mining investments, most importantly his half-ownership of the Fourth of July Mine in Central City. After a two-week honeymoon in Denver's American House, the newlyweds joined the elder Doe in the mining town in the mountains. Lizzie found Colorado enchanting. There she may have gained the nickname "Baby Doe".

== Move to Colorado ==
In Central City, she quickly found that her husband's reserved temperament was unsuitable for a boisterous frontier mining town, and that he was unable either to manage a mine on his own or to follow his father's instructions on how to do so. Rather than see him fail, and enchanted with the possibility of becoming wealthy from mining gold, she helped her husband. She often dressed in mining clothes and worked directly in the mine. Despite a somewhat relaxed culture in the frontier mining town, those in the highest strata of the city's society considered her behavior and dress scandalous, causing her to be ignored. Through both their efforts, the Does did manage to bring up a small amount of gold, but when the vein ran out and a poorly constructed shaft collapsed, Harvey gave up and decided to take a job as a common mucker at another mine. He told his wife to stop wearing men's clothing and stay at home.

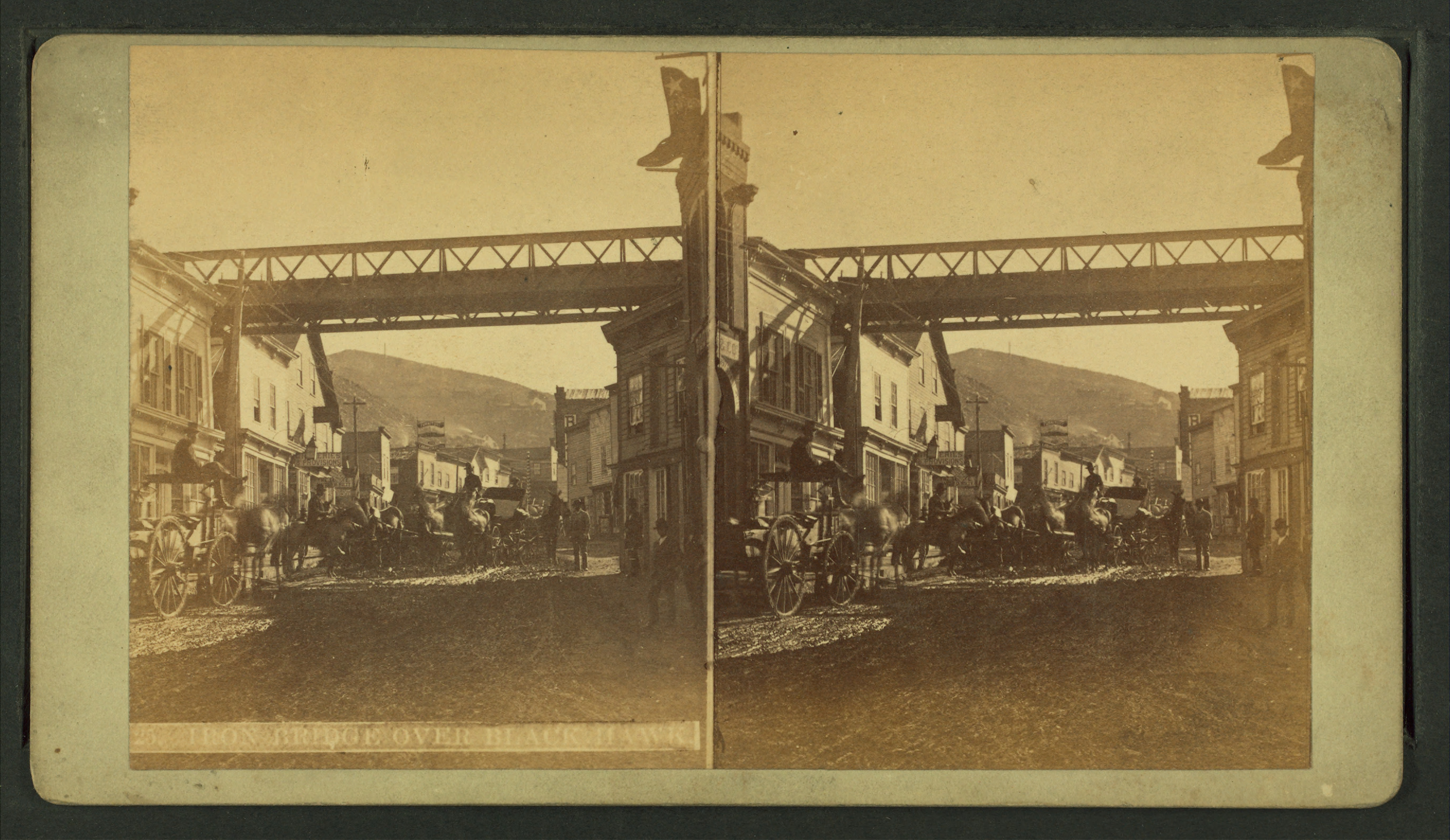
View of Black Hawk during the period Baby Doe Tabor lived there.

At that time, they moved from Central City to Black Hawk to live in a less expensive rooming house. Greatly disappointed and disenchanted by the noise and dirt in Black Hawk, Baby Doe began to take walks around the city each day. Then aged 23, she may have gained the name "Baby Doe" from the local men watching. She lacked domestic skills with which to work and earn money, and she had nothing in common with the women of the town. Often, having little to do with her time, she visited the local clothing store, attracted in part by the expensive fabrics. She became friendly with the owner of the town's clothing store, Jake Sandelowsky (Sands). At the same time Harvey lost his job, and their marriage began to deteriorate. By that time Baby Doe was pregnant. Suspecting the child was Jake's, Harvey left her temporarily, and in July 1879, Baby Doe gave birth to a stillborn boy.

Meanwhile, Harvey's parents, expecting a grandchild, had moved to Colorado to be near the family. Disappointed, they severed their ties with the two and moved to Idaho Springs, while Baby Doe followed Harvey to Denver, despite wishing for a divorce from him. In Denver, Harvey frequented saloons and brothels. After witnessing him with a prostitute, Baby Doe filed for divorce on the grounds of adultery. The divorce was quickly granted in March 1880, but for unknown reasons was not officially recorded until April 1886 [footnote needed]. Baby Doe then moved to Leadville, Colorado, almost certainly invited there by Sandelowsky, who changed his name to Sands. Alone and without a husband, Baby Doe needed to find a means of financial support quickly. Jake Sandelowsky, who opened a store in Leadville and almost certainly wanted to marry her, offered her employment. Working at a clothing store, however, was a prospect Baby Doe found dull, boring, and too similar to the life she had left behind in Oshkosh.

== Leadville ==
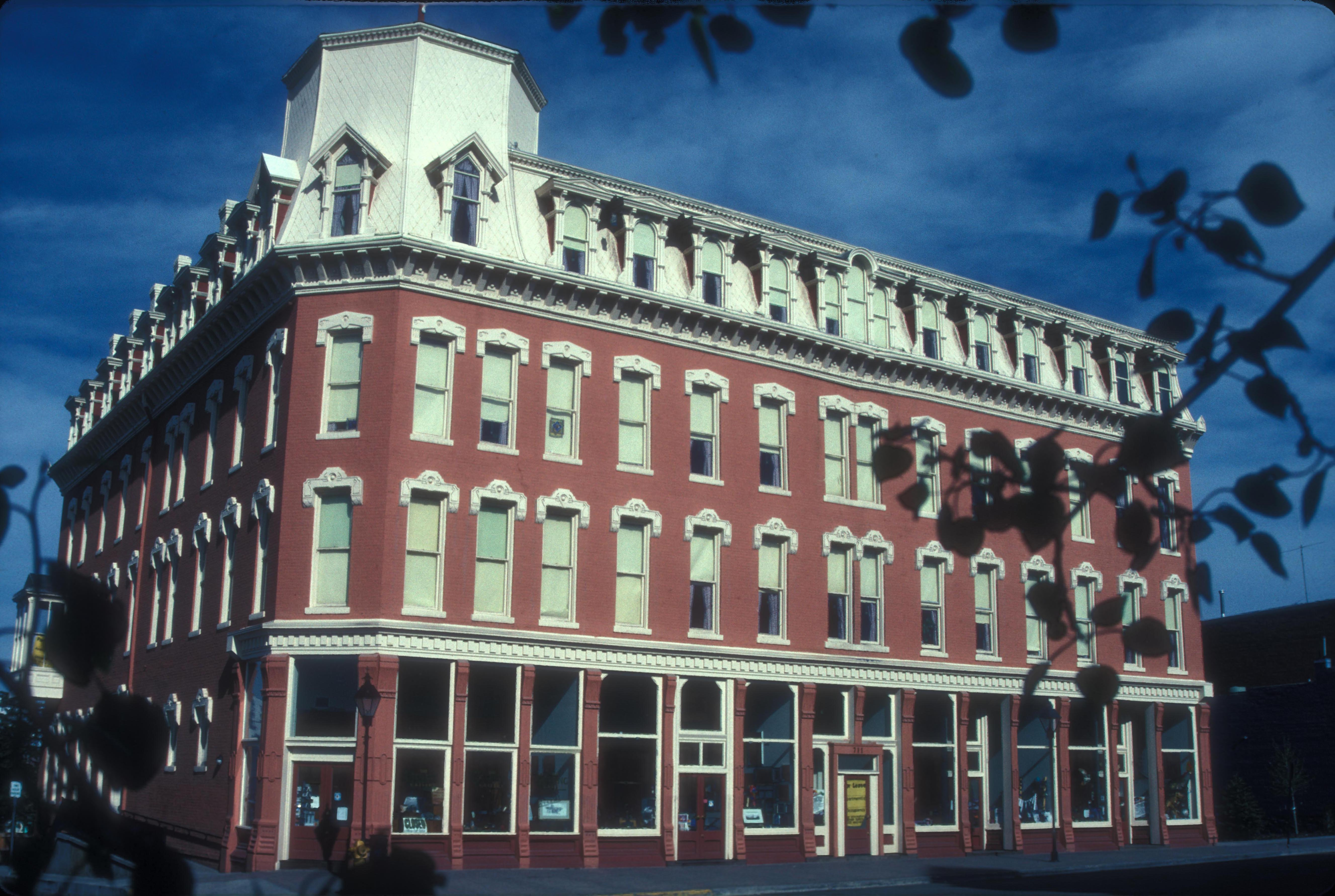
Horace Tabor built the Tabor Grand Hotel in Leadville, shown here in a modern photograph.

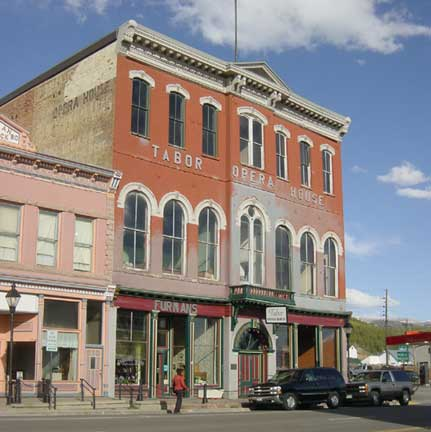
The Tabor Opera House in Leadville

In Leadville, she caught the attention of Horace Tabor, mining millionaire and owner of Leadville's Matchless Mine. Tabor was married, but in 1880 he left his wife Augusta Tabor to be with Baby Doe; he established her in plush suites at hotels in Leadville and Denver.

Horace and Augusta had lived for 25 years on the frontier, first moving to Kansas where they tried their hand at agriculture, then following the gold rush to Colorado, but never striking it rich. Eventually they found their way to Leadville, where Horace, in 1878, grub-staked two prospectors with about $60 worth of goods ($2,000 today) in return for one-third of their profits. To everyone's surprise, the two men's stake was successful, beginning Tabor's path to wealth. With his profits, he bought out the two, then bought stakes in more mines and had a house built in Denver. He ran successfully for Lieutenant Governor of Colorado in 1878 and established the Little Pittsburg Consolidated Mining Company, which quickly gained a worth of about $20 million ($667 million today). He bought the Matchless Mine, which for many years produced large amounts of silver. His profits were so great that he was quickly on his way to becoming one of the richest men in the country.

At an altitude of 10,000 feet, Leadville was the second largest city in Colorado. It boasted over 100 saloons and gambling places, multiple daily and weekly newspapers, and 36 brothels. Tabor's presence seemed to be everywhere. He opened the Tabor Opera House in Leadville, bought luxury items for his wife, Augusta, and established a private army that he used for protection of his holdings and as a force against striking miners. He spent his money lavishly, mostly on his own entertainment—drinking, gambling and frequenting brothels. In 1880, Augusta moved away from him to live in Denver while Tabor enjoyed himself in Leadville. A Denver newspaper columnist described him as "Stoop-shouldered; ambling gait ...black hair, inclined to baldness ....dresses in black; magnificent cuff buttons of diamonds and onyx ...worth 8 million dollars." Historian Judy Nolte Temple writes that it "seemed inevitable that the prettiest woman in the mining West would eventually meet the richest man."

Baby Doe met Horace Tabor in a restaurant in Leadville one evening in 1880. She told him her story and that she had arrived in Leadville because of Jake Sandelowsky's generosity. Tabor gave her $5,000 on the spot. Baby Doe then had a message, and $1,000, delivered to Sandelowsky, in which she declared that she would not marry him. Instead, Tabor moved her to the Clarendon Hotel, next to the opera house and Sandelowsky's store, Sands, Pelton & Company. Sandelowsky later moved to Aspen, where he opened another store, married, and built a house.

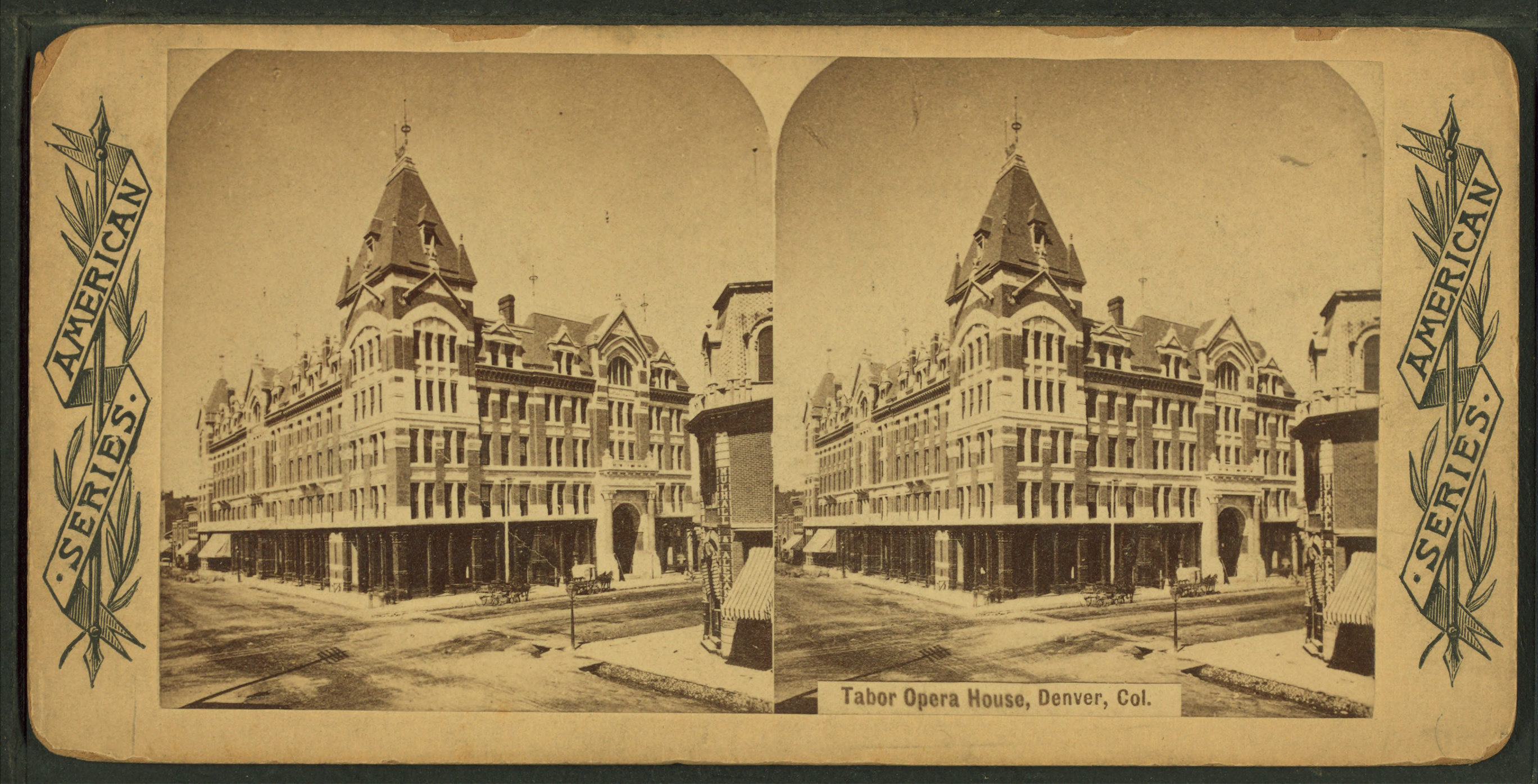
Tabor Opera House, Denver, Col, from Robert N. Dennis collection of stereoscopic views

Some months later, Tabor moved Baby Doe to the Windsor Hotel in Denver. A newly constructed turreted building, meant to look like Windsor castle, the hotel had extremely lavish decorations, such as mirrors made of diamond dust. Tabor had a gold-leafed bathtub in his suite. Guests were wealthy, well-known and well-connected.

Baby Doe claimed to love Tabor, and he loved her. He moved permanently out of his Denver home and asked his wife Augusta for a divorce. She refused him. He, in turn, refused to send her an invitation to attend the grand opening of Denver's Tabor Grand Opera House. He stopped giving his wife money; she sued him but failed; he again demanded a divorce. Baby Doe suggested that he seek a divorce in a different jurisdiction, and in 1882 a Durango, Colorado, judge granted them a divorce. However, the filing was irregular, and once Tabor realized that, he had the county clerk paste together two pages in the records to hide the action. Despite his existing marriage to Augusta, Horace Tabor and Elizabeth McCourt Doe married secretly in St. Louis, Missouri, in September 1882. At that time, both were bigamists: his divorce was questionable and hers was not yet recorded.

== Marriage to Horace Tabor ==
In January 1883, Augusta sued Tabor again, and now he compensated her with real estate in Denver and stock in his mines. Tabor finally obtained a legal divorce at that time. That same month, the Colorado State Legislature appointed him to a 30-day term as United States Senator to fill a temporary vacancy, because the sitting senator, Henry Teller, had been appointed a cabinet member. Baby Doe and Horace married publicly on 1 March 1883, just two months after Tabor and Augusta had divorced. He was 52 and she 28, and she claimed to be only 22. The marriage took place at the Willard Hotel in Washington, DC, during Tabor's brief tenure as a US senator. Baby Doe invited President Chester A. Arthur and other dignitaries, all of whom attended, as reported by the media at the time of her death, though a more recent biography claims many invitations were declined.

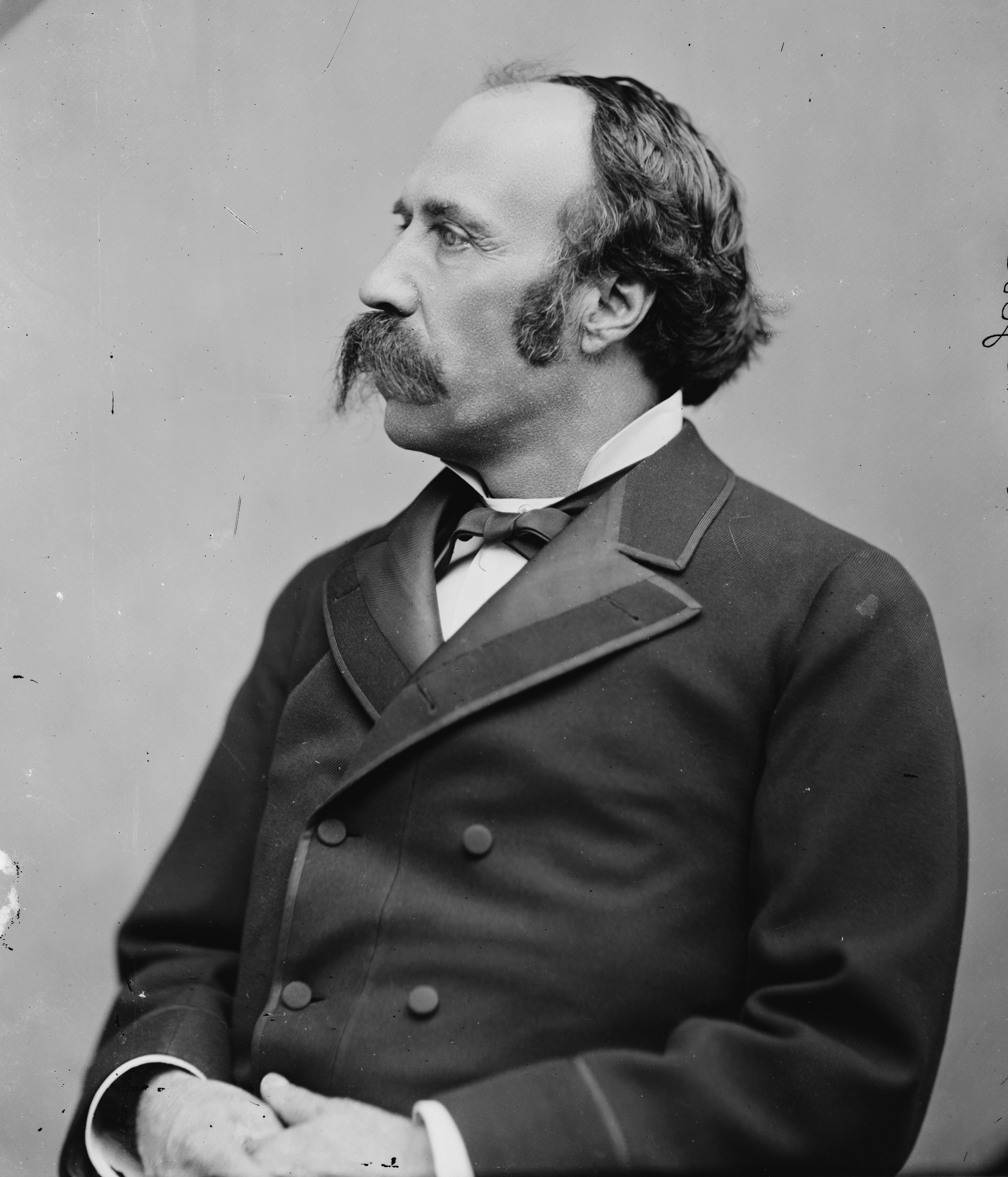
Photograph of Horace Austin Warner Tabor, taken between 1870 and 1880

She planned a lavish wedding, going first to Oshkosh, making arrangements for her family to attend the event, and purchasing clothing and jewelry for them. Her mother was proud that her daughter was marrying a wealthy man, and Baby Doe herself was quite happy. At her wedding in Washington, she wore a white satin dress that cost $7,000 and the $90,000 necklace known as the "Isabella" necklace. Two days after the wedding, the priest who had performed the ceremony refused to sign the marriage license, when he learned that both the bride and the groom had previously divorced and that Baby Doe was a Roman Catholic. Although Tabor's contemporaries had winked at or ignored his dalliance with Baby Doe, Tabor's divorce and quick remarriage created a scandal, which prevented the couple from being accepted in polite society. Only a few months later, Horace's bid to be elected governor of Colorado ended in failure. Baby Doe's father died at around the same time.

The couple returned to Colorado, where they took up permanent residence in a Denver mansion. Baby Doe was snubbed by Denver socialites, from whom she received neither visits nor invitations. Although she did not join charities or clubs, as was customary during that period for wealthy women, she was generous with her money, donating funds to various charities and providing free offices to the Colorado suffragette movement. To keep herself busy, she shopped, bought jewelry and clothing, had her hair done and continued with the hobby of scrapbooking that she had taken up when living in Central City.

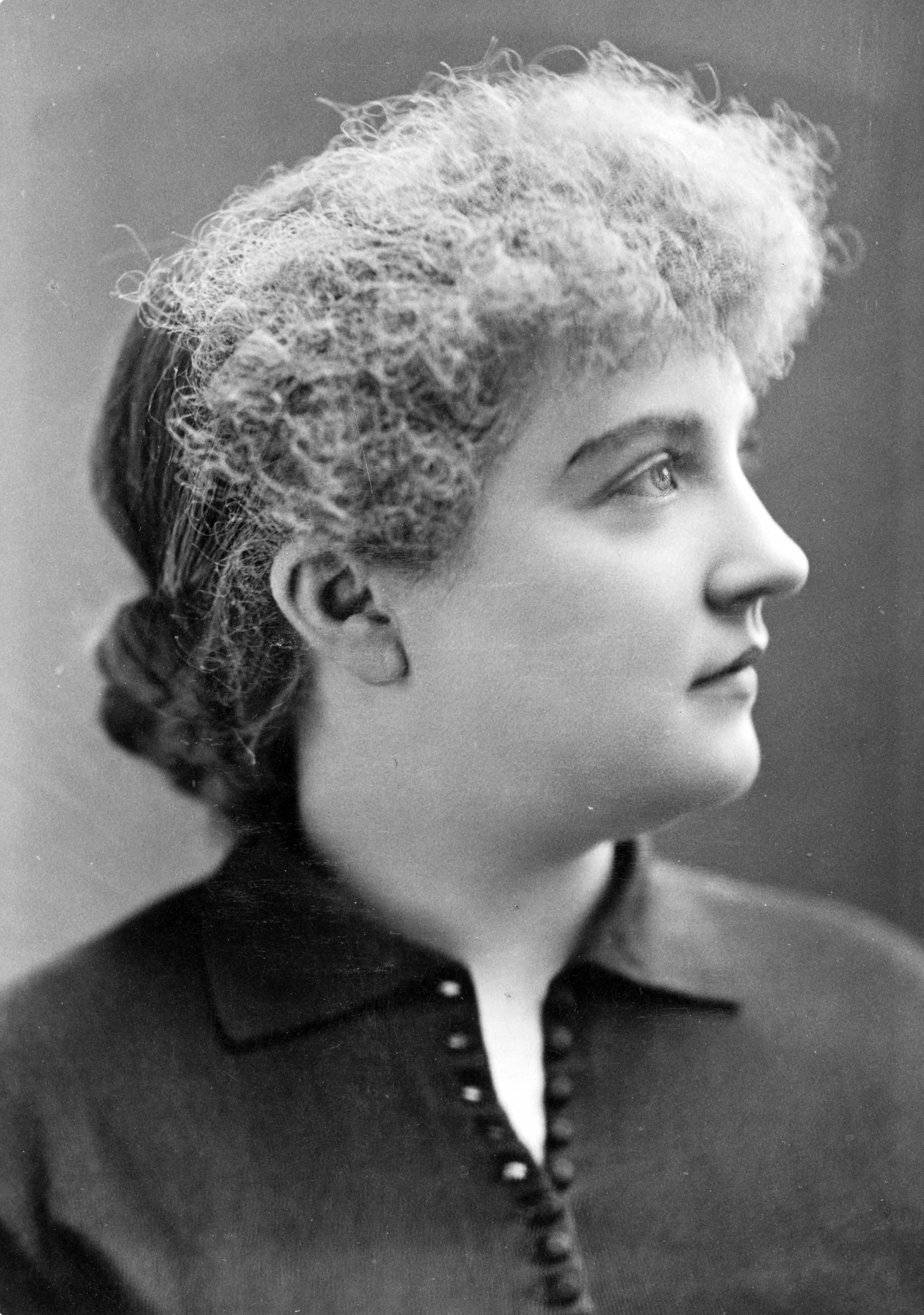
Photograph of Baby Doe Tabor taken between 1885 and 1895

On July 13, 1884, she gave birth to the first of her and Tabor's two daughters, Elizabeth Bonduel Lily Tabor. The infant was christened in an extravagant and frilly outfit costing $15,000. Baby Doe was reportedly a good mother, staying at home with her daughter instead of accompanying Horace on his frequent trips to look after widespread business interests. Their second daughter, Rose Mary Echo Silver Dollar Tabor, was born on December 17, 1889. Both girls were attractive and well looked-after, and their mother doted on them. The second child was fondly called Silver or Silver Dollar, whom Baby Doe "defiantly nursed ... as she rode through the streets in Denver in one of her carriages."

A year after the birth of their second child, in 1890, the Sherman Silver Purchase Act was enacted, which brought to Colorado, and Colorado mine-owners, the hope that wildly fluctuating silver prices would stabilize. Profits from silver mining had diminished as the supply had declined and the extraction process and labor costs had increased. When a few of Horace's investments began to fail, he was forced to mortgage the Tabor theater in Denver and other real estate he had bought during the past decades.

Horace Tabor lost his fortune in 1893 when the repeal of the Silver Act caused the Panic of 1893. Silver prices plummeted and fortunes in Colorado were instantly wiped out. As she had with her first husband, Baby Doe pitched in. Horace gave her the legal power to run his business concerns in Denver, and she made decisions for him during his absences. To raise money, she sold most of her jewelry, and when the couple had the power turned off in their mansion, she made a game of it for the children. Eventually, the mansion and its contents were sold. At age 65, to earn a living, Horace took a job as a common mineworker, while the family lived in a boarding house. From 1893 to 1898, the Tabors endured great poverty, although some friends lent them money. To save him from poverty, some political friends arranged his appointment as postmaster of Denver in 1898. The family at that time lived on his annual salary of $3,700 per year and took up residence in a plain room at the Windsor Hotel. Horace's health soon gave out, and 15 months after his appointment to the position, he died.

His funeral was well attended, with perhaps as many as 10,000 there. On his deathbed, he is said to have told Baby Doe to "hold on to the Matchless mine … it will make millions again when silver comes back." However, that story might not be true; by then, it appears they had mortgaged and/or lost the Matchless mine. At the time of her husband's death, Baby Doe was still an attractive woman in her mid-forties.

== Later years ==
=== The Matchless mine ===
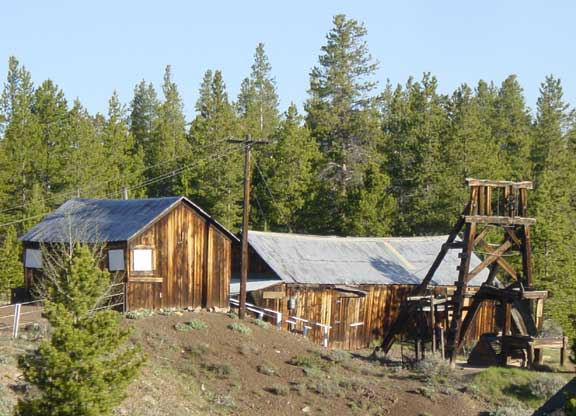
Matchless mine and Baby Doe Tabor cabin, where she lived for the latter part of her life

After her husband's death, Baby Doe stayed in Denver for a period, according to her diaries and correspondence. Why she decided to leave Denver and the society there to make a return to Leadville, in the high mountains with its cold winters, is unknown, but it almost certainly had to do with the Matchless mine. For two years, she unsuccessfully tried to find investors to bring the Matchless back into production. The family may have tried to regain ownership of the Matchless mine, but documentation is fragmented, and it is unclear to whom the mine belonged at that time. In 1901, one of her McCourt sisters may have attempted to buy the mine at a sheriff's sale, but again the fragmented documentation is murky about ownership. When Baby Doe moved with her girls back to Leadville, she claimed she would work the mine herself, despite its deteriorated condition. Temple writes that the mine's shafts were flooded and had not been in working condition for many years, and furthermore that Horace would have known this. To earn money, she took on menial domestic jobs. Unknown to her, her brother paid the grocer so that the three women had food. Eventually, in an attempt to keep the decrepit mine going and to raise funds, she reluctantly sold the "Isabella necklace" Tabor had given her, but during her lifetime she refused to sell his gold watch fob.

Her older daughter, Lily, left her mother to live with Baby Doe's family in Wisconsin. Later, after her mother died, Lily denied being Baby Doe's daughter. Of the two daughters, Lily, born into wealth, seemed more affected by the fall into poverty. When in 1902, Baby Doe traveled with her daughters to Oshkosh to visit her relatives, Lily decided then to prolong her visit, to stay and provide care for her elderly grandmother. Later, Lily moved to Chicago, where in 1908 she married her first cousin, and soon after gave birth to Baby Doe's grandchild. In 1911, Baby Doe and Silver Dollar again visited relatives in Wisconsin, going on to visit Lily in Chicago. After such a prolonged absence, Lily claimed she barely knew Silver Dollar.

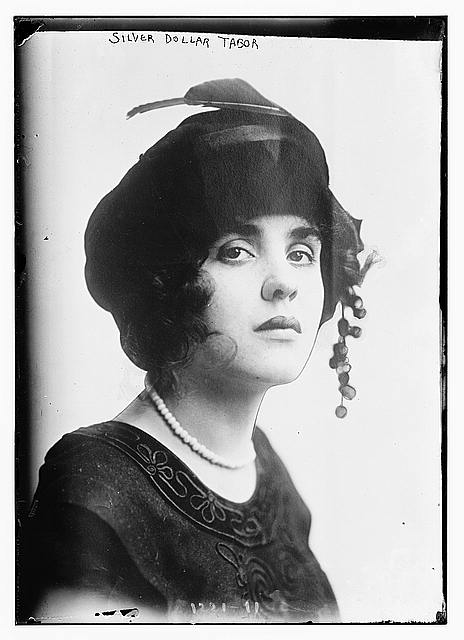
Baby Doe's daughter Silver Dollar Tabor

After Lily's departure, Baby Doe and Silver Dollar moved into a cabin on the site of the Matchless mine. The living quarters were basic and inadequate for Colorado winters: "All told, it was no larger than a medium sized room. Two windows had been cut into the flimsy weatherboards, but these had been nailed up". The structure was a former tool shed located adjacent to the hoisthouse, described by a visitor in 1927 as "crowded with very primitive furniture, decorated with religious pictures, and stacked high in newspapers." The cabin was isolated, located above Leadville in Little Strayhorse Gulch, and had an unimpeded view of Mount Elbert and Mount Massive.

Silver Dollar also left Leadville soon after she had turned to drink, and had become sexually promiscuous. Worried, Baby Doe was happy to send her away to Denver. There, Silver Dollar wrote for the Denver Times, sending part of her earnings to her mother on a weekly basis. She then attempted to become a novelist, while at the same time gaining a bad reputation in Denver for her drunken antics. Perhaps to escape Colorado, she moved to Chicago, where again she tried her hand at writing. Eventually, after working as a dancer under various names, she became the mistress of a Chicago gangster. In 1925, Silver Dollar was found scalded to death under suspicious circumstances in her Chicago boarding house, where she had been living under the name "Ruth Norman". For the rest of her life, Baby Doe refused to believe the woman found as Ruth Norman had been her daughter, stating, "I did not see the body they said was my little girl."

Alone in the cabin outside Leadville, Baby Doe turned to religion. She considered her life of great wealth a period of vanity and created penances for herself. During the bitterly frigid Colorado high-country winters, she wound burlap sacks around her legs. With no money, she ate very little, living on stale bread and suet, and refused to accept charity. Baby Doe lived like this for 35 years. During these years, she wrote incessantly. In diaries, letters, and scraps that she called "Dreams and Visions", consisting of about 2,000 fragments later found bundled in piles of paper in her cabin, she wrote entries such as: "Nov. 26—1918 Papa Tabor's Birthday I owe my room rent & am in need of food and only enough bread for tonight & breakfast .... my shoes and stockings only 1 pair are in rags." An eyewitness described her in 1927 as dressed "in corduroy trousers, mining boots, and a torn soiled blouse .... [with] a blue bandana tied around her head", and went on to say that "her eyes were very far apart and a gorgeous blue".

She wandered the streets of Leadville, rags on her feet, wearing a cross, and came to be known as a madwoman. Some who had been acquainted with her earlier thought she deserved to suffer for having broken up the marriage between Horace and Augusta and believed that she had been the cause of his ruin. At that time, Leadville had lost much of its boomtown population and was becoming a ghost town. She often walked the empty streets at night, dressed in a mixture of women's and men's clothing, wearing trousers and mining boots. She protected the mine from strangers with a shotgun and "she became a sad spectre of Baby Doe to old-timers; a spectacle to the young."

=== Death ===
On March 7, 1935, after an unusually severe snowstorm, some neighbors noticed that no smoke was coming out of the chimney at the Matchless mine cabin. Investigating, they found Baby Doe dead, her body frozen on the floor. The Rocky Mountain News reported that a miner named Tom French and neighbor Sue Bonney, concerned at not seeing her for some days, broke into the cabin and found the body. The newspaper went on to compare her to another female Leadville resident, Molly Brown. For one last time, Baby Doe made the front pages of the papers. Her death certificate states the cause of death as acute myocarditis. The interment had to be postponed because the ground in Leadville at that time of year was "still frozen five feet deep". While a gravesite was being prepared in Leadville—the ground had to be dynamited—wealthy Denverites raised money to have her body brought there. A funeral mass was held in Leadville, then her casket was sent by train to Denver. She was apparently 81 years old at the time of her death.

Her remaining possessions were auctioned off to souvenir collectors for $700. Baby Doe Tabor is buried with her husband in Mount Olivet Cemetery in Wheat Ridge, Colorado.

== Reputation and legacy ==
Baby Doe Tabor is a legend among the women of the mining West. She holds the reputation of being a great beauty, a home-wrecker, and in her later years, a madwoman. Judy Nolte Temple writes that Baby Doe's legend, and her sins, grew quickly in retelling, as evidenced by an exaggerated description of her death in an early biography: "The formerly beautiful and glamorous Baby Doe Tabor ... was found dead on her cabin floor .... only partially clothed ....frozen into the shape of a cross". She was rumored to be a gold-digger and a poor mother. Scavengers searched for non-existent treasure after her death, but Temple says the real treasure was found in Baby Doe's writing, which has taken decades to archive, analyze and study, and only now is beginning to reveal the inner life of the woman. Temple sees her as one in a long line of women who endured shunning and punishment for her beauty and for being disruptive to prevailing social norms. Temple speculates that Baby Doe's move to Leadville after Horace's death may have been self-shunning from Denver society.

Baby Doe was portrayed in the Warner Brothers film Silver Dollar, which premiered in Denver in 1932. "Lily", the fictionalized character of Baby Doe, was portrayed by actress Bebe Daniels; Edward G. Robinson played Yates Martin, a fictionalized Horace Tabor. Douglas Moore's opera The Ballad of Baby Doe premiered in Central City, Colorado, in 1956. In the New York premiere in 1958, Baby Doe was sung by Beverly Sills. In the 1970s, a string of western-themed "Baby Doe's Matchless Mine" restaurants was established in a number of US cities. Almost all are now closed.

In 1985, Baby Doe Tabor was inducted into the Colorado Women's Hall of Fame.

== See also ==
- Silver Dollar (film)

== Bibliography ==
- Bancroft, Caroline (1996). Silver Queen: The Fabulous Story of Baby Doe Tabor. Boulder: Johnson Publishing Company. ISBN 9780933472211.
- Burke, John (1974). The Legend of Baby Doe. New York: G.P. Putnam's Sons. ISBN 9780803261037.
- Langley Hall, Gordon aka Dawn Langley Simmons (1962). The Two Lives of Baby Doe. Philadelphia: Macrae Smith. LCCN 62011723.
- Karsner, David (1960). Silver Dollar: The Story of the Tabors. New York: Crown Publishers. ISBN 9780517184912.
- Riley, Glenda; Etulin, Richard (2003). Wild Women of the Old West. Golden: Fulcrum Publishing. ISBN 9781555912956.
- Smith, Duane A. (1973). Horace Tabor: His Life and Legend. Boulder: University Press of Colorado. ISBN 9780870810459.
- Temple, Judy Nolte (2007). Baby Doe Tabor: The Madwoman in the Cabin. Norman: University of Oklahoma Press. ISBN 9780806140353.
- Willison, George F. (1972). Here They Dug the Gold. New York: Ballantine Books. ISBN 9780873801584.
