= Beatrice Krebs =

American opera singer

Beatrice Krebs (March 12, 1924 – February 5, 2011) was an American operatic mezzo-soprano.

== Life and career ==
Born in Cleveland, Krebs made her professional opera debut in 1952 at the New York City Opera (NYCO) as Miss Todd in Gian Carlo Menotti's The Old Maid and the Thief. In 1953 & 1958 she was a soloist with the Naumburg Orchestral Concerts in the Naumburg Bandshell, Central Park for that summer series. In 1956 she portrayed Mama McCourt in the world premiere of Douglas Moore's The Ballad of Baby Doe at the Central City Opera. She repeated that role for the opera's NYCO premiere in 1958 and on the 1959 NYCO recording of the opera. She can also be heard on the 1959 recording of Igor Stravinsky's Threni with the Columbia Symphony Orchestra. From 1961 to 1963 she performed the role of the Mother Abbess in the first national tour of The Sound of Music with Florence Henderson as Maria. After the tour ended, she joined the voice faculty at Carnegie Mellon University in 1963. She was later promoted to the position of head of the voice faculty at that institution. She died in Golden Valley, Minnesota in 2011 at the age of 86.
