= Dolores Wilson =

American actress

Dolores Wilson as Rosina in 1954

Dolores Mae Wilson (August 9, 1928 – September 28, 2010) was an American coloratura soprano who had an active international opera career from the late 1940s through the early 1960s. Beginning her career with major theatres in Europe, she performed in six seasons at the Metropolitan Opera in New York City during the 1950s. She is perhaps best known for originating the title role in the world premiere of Douglas Moore's The Ballad of Baby Doe at the Central City Opera in 1956. After abandoning her opera career, she embarked on a second career as a musical theatre actress; making several appearances on Broadway in the following decades.

== Early life and education ==
Wilson was born on August 9, 1928, in Philadelphia. After her parents separated, she moved to New York City with her fashion designer mother, who counted Dinah Shore and Loretta Young among her customers.

She grew up in the Bronx and attended Catholic schools before entering Jamaica High School from which she graduated. She received classical voice training in NYC with William Hermann and also studied piano, ballet, and tap dancing during her youth. At the age of 16 she began singing on American radio; and her talents were noticed and supported by then General Manager of the Metropolitan Opera Edward Johnson and Met soprano Lucrezia Bori. She traveled to Italy to pursue training in opera in Venice with the famed soprano Toti Dal Monte; partially because her maternal grandparents hailed from that country.

She found that the Italian language she had learned through her opera training prepared her poorly for communicating with natives in the language, saying "the Italian I'd learned by studying operas enabled me to talk intelligently only about poisons and suicide and tragic love affairs".

== Opera career ==
In November 1948 Wilson made her professional opera debut at the Teatro Grande in Brescia under the name Dolores Vilsoni as Rosina in Gioachino Rossini's The Barber of Seville with Cesare Siepi as her Basilio. She spent her early career performing with major opera houses in Italy; with important house debuts including the Teatro Massimo in Palermo (1950 as Gilda in Giuseppe Verdi's Rigoletto), the Teatro dell'Opera di Roma (1951 as Gilda), and La Fenice (1951 as Gilda).

She made her South American debut at the Teatro Municipal in Rio de Janeiro in 1952 singing both Gilda and Rosina. She returned to the Teatro Grande in Brescia as Rosina in 1952. She sang that role at several other theatres, including in 1953 for her first performance in France at the Aix-en-Provence Festival and for her debut at the Opéra de Monte-Carlo. She was soon engaged as a guest artist with other important European theatres during the 1950s; including the Grand Théâtre de Bordeaux, the Liceu in Barcelona, the Opéra de Nice, the Teatro Lirico Giuseppe Verdi in Trieste, the Teatro Massimo Bellini in Catania, and the Teatro Nacional de São Carlos in Lisbon.

Wilson made her United States operatic debut at the Metropolitan Opera in February 1954 in the title role in Gaetano Donizetti's Lucia di Lammermoor, performing together with tenor Jan Peerce. Under the headline "Dolores Wilson Scores as Lucia", critic Howard Taubman of The New York Times said "Her voice is fresh in quality, large in size and flexible in production" and credited her with having " sung "a Lucia of uncommon merit".

In a December 1954 performance of Susanna in Wolfgang Amadeus Mozart's The Marriage of Figaro, Wilson was a last minute replacement for the scheduled performer Nadine Conner, and despite the last minute notice was said to have "essayed a difficult new role with great success". Her replacement of another singer, however, was less enthusiastically received; being called on to step in for Maria Callas in the role of Lucia on December 11, 1956. Even before the curtain rose, police were dispersing irate claimants for refunds on that occasion. She performed at the Met as Gilda, Oscar in Verdi's Un ballo in maschera, Rosina, and Zerlina in Mozart's Don Giovanni.

On July 7, 1956, Wilson entered the annals of opera history when she created the title role in the world premiere of Douglas Moore's seminal work The Ballad of Baby Doe at the Central City Opera in Central City, Colorado, with Lenya Gabriele alternating in the role during the rest of its initial run. In November 1956 she made her debut at the Lyric Opera of Chicago as Musetta in Giacomo Puccini's La bohème. In 1957 she toured to 23 cities in the United States with the NBC Opera Theatre performing the role of Violetta in Verdi's La traviata.

At the Metropolitan Opera in March 1959, Wilson removed a neck brace she was wearing and filled in for Lily Pons in the title role of Lucia di Lammermoor, completing the performance but collapsing in her dressing room afterward and being taken to the hospital. She ultimately left the Met under circumstances which were termed "creative differences" with the company's general manager Rudolf Bing.

Wilson continued to perform internationally in operas in the early 1960s; appearing in theatres in the United States, Spain, Portugal, Switzerland, Germany and South America. Other roles she performed on stage included Amina in Vincenzo Bellini's La Sonnambula, Hanna Glawari in Franz Lehár's The Merry Widow, Marie in Donizetti's La fille du régiment, Norina in Donizetti's Don Pasquale, Philine in Ambroise Thomas's Mignon, and the title role in Donizetti's Linda di Chamounix. In 1959 she recorded excerpts of the role of Norina for RCA Records.

== Musical theatre career and later life ==
Turning to Broadway, Wilson debuted in the 1965 production of The Yearling with David Wayne. Later that year she took over the role of Golde in the original Broadway production of Fiddler on the Roof from actress Maria Karnilova; and was again seen in that part in 1968–69. She performed in the original casts of two more musicals: portraying Maria Haggerty in Cry for Us All (1970) and Aunt Jenny in I Remember Mama (1979).

In August 1979 she took over the role of Miss Hannigan in the original production of Charles Strouse and Martin Charnin's Annie. Her last appearance on Broadway was in 1983 as Vivian Proclo in the revival of Terrence McNally's The Ritz. She also appeared in productions with numerous regional theaters in the United States.

== Death ==
A resident of the Lillian Booth Actors Fund Home in Englewood, New Jersey, Wilson died there at the age of 82 on September 28, 2010, due to natural causes. Both of her marriages had ended in divorce and she left no immediate survivors.
