= I Loved a Woman =

1933 film

- 1933 Theatrical Poster
- Directed by: Alfred E. Green
- Screenplay by: Charles Kenyon; Sidney Sutherland
- Based on: Red Meat novel by David Karsner
- Produced by: Henry Blanke
- Starring: Kay Francis; Edward G. Robinson; Genevieve Tobin
- Cinematography: James Van Trees
- Edited by: Herbert Levy
- Music by: Bernhard Kaun
- Production company: First National Pictures
- Distributed by: Warner Bros. Pictures
- Release date: September 23, 1933
- Running time: 90 min.
- Country: United States
- Language: English

I Loved a Woman is a 1933 American pre-Code drama directed by Alfred E. Green, starring Kay Francis, Edward G. Robinson, and Genevieve Tobin. According to producer Hal Wallis' autobiography (with Charles Higham), Robinson and Francis "were oddly matched. Kay was so tall that we had to put Eddie [Robinson] on a box in some scenes to bring him level with her and, understandably he was humiliated. Irritable and self-conscious, he argued with Kay frequently. But he [...] gave credit to her fine acting." However, it was Wallis and other executives who also made the choice to cut three of Kay's scenes, leaving her presence in the film really as a supporting actress.

== Plot ==
John Hayden, owner of a Chicago meat-packing company, falls in love with a beautiful opera singer.

== Cast ==
- Edward G. Robinson as John Mansfield Hayden
- Kay Francis as Laura McDonald
- Genevieve Tobin as Martha Lane Hayden
- Robert Barrat as Charles Lane
- Murray Kinnell as Davenport
- Robert McWade as Larkin
- J. Farrell MacDonald as Shuster
- Henry Kolker as Mr. Sanborn
- George Blackwood as Henry
- Walter Walker as Oliver
- Henry O'Neill as Mr. Farrell
- E. J. Ratcliffe as Theodore Roosevelt
- William V. Mong as Bowen
- Douglass Dumbrille as Brandt (uncredited)
- Howard Hickman as Businessman (uncredited)
- Edwin Maxwell as Gossiper (uncredited)
