= Bravo! Vail =

Coordinates: 39°38′22″N 106°21′53″W

Bravo! Vail is an annual classical music festival held in Vail, Colorado. Its current artistic director is Chris Rogerson.

== Overview ==
The six-week-long festival begins in late June and ends in early August. Programming consists of chamber music, classical music, and pops concerts provided by the Dallas Symphony Orchestra, The Philadelphia Orchestra, the New York Philharmonic, and an international guest chamber orchestra with chamber music ensembles.

London's acclaimed Academy of St Martin in the Fields, led by violinist Joshua Bell, was the first international chamber orchestra to have a residency at Bravo! Vail. In 2019, the Chamber Orchestra Vienna – Berlin, featuring German violinist Anne Sophie Mutter, opened the Bravo! Vail season in their North American debut. The Academy of St Martin in the Fields returned for a three-night residency in 2023, and in 2024, Bravo! Vail welcomed its first Latin American chamber orchestra, Mexico City's Sinfónica de Minería, with its Artistic Director Carlos Miguel Prieto.

== Performance venues ==
Bravo! Vail utilizes many venues around Vail and the Eagle River Valley community during the season, including:

- Gerald R. Ford Amphitheater
- Vilar Performing Arts Center
- Vail Interfaith Chapel
- Edwards Interfaith Chapel and Community Center
- Donovan Pavilion
- Brush Creek Pavilion
- Tabor Opera House

== Programming ==
In a typical season, Bravo! Vail provides a number of concerts and events, including:

- Orchestral Series
- Chamber Music Series
- Immersive Experiences
- Classically Uncorked
- Linda & Mitch Hart Soirée Series
- Community Concerts
- Family Concerts
- Education & Engagement Events
  - Music Makers Haciendo Música
  - Young Musicians Day
  - Summer Intensive
  - Little Listeners @ the Library
  - Inside The Music
  - Piano Fellows
  - Pre-Concert Talks
  - Chamber Musicians in Residence
  - Music Education Month
  - Jane and Gary Bomba Internship Program

== Artists and ensembles who have performed at Bravo! Vail ==
A number of artists and musical ensembles have performed at Bravo! Vail since it was founded. Below is a list of some of its notable performers:

- Academy of St Martin in the Fields
- Colorado Springs Philharmonic Orchestra
- Dallas Symphony Orchestra
- Colorado Symphony Orchestra
- Detroit Symphony Orchestra
- National Repertory Orchestra
- New York Philharmonic
- Rochester Philharmonic Orchestra
- The Philadelphia Orchestra
- Chamber Orchestra Vienna-Berlin
- The Saint Paul Chamber Orchestra
- Sinfónica de Minería
