= Horace Traubel =

American poet

- Born: December 19, 1858; Camden, New Jersey, United States
- Died: September 8, 1919 (aged 60); Bon Echo, Ontario, Canada
- Burial place: Harleigh Cemetery, Camden, New Jersey
- Occupations: essayist, poet, magazine publisher, writer, and Georgist
- Known for: associated with the Arts and Crafts movement
- Notable work: The Conservator, The Artsman, The Worker
- Spouse: Anne (m. 1891)
- Children: 1 daughter, 1 son

Horace Logo Traubel (December 19, 1858 – September 8, 1919) was an American essayist, poet, magazine publisher, writer, and Georgist. Traubel was closely associated with the Arts and Crafts movement in the United States and published a monthly literary magazine called The Conservator from 1890 until the time of his death. Although a poet of note in his own right, Traubel is best remembered as the literary executor and biographer of his friend, poet Walt Whitman, with whom he transcribed and compiled nine volumes of daily conversations, entitled With Walt Whitman in Camden.

== Biography ==
=== Early years ===
Horace L. Traubel was born in Camden, New Jersey on December 19, 1858, the son of an ethnic Jewish father and an ethnic German mother. His father, Maurice Traubel, had been born in Germany before emigrating to the United States as a young man, where he settled in Philadelphia and learned the trade of lithography. His mother, the former Katherine Grunder, met Maurice after his arrival.

Horace was the fifth child of seven born to the couple. He left school at an early age, going to work at the age of 12 as a paperboy before working variously as a printers' assistant, lithographer, cub reporter at a newspaper, and bank clerk.

Early in his life he came to know Walt Whitman, whose volume of poetry Leaves of Grass was the subject of much hostile commentary among the literary critics of the day.

Traubel married in 1891. He and his wife Anne had two children — a daughter who survived him and a son who died at the age of 5. The family moved from Philadelphia to neighboring Camden, New Jersey, but Traubel maintained an office across the Delaware River in the big city for years afterwards. Outside of marriage, Traubel carried on affairs with men and women, fathering illegitimate children.

=== Career ===
Traubel began to write himself in the late 1880s, specializing in literary criticism and poetry. In 1890 Traubel founded a literary journal, The Conservator, a monthly publication, which he continued until the time of his death nearly three decades later. Although the publication never attained a mass readership, it was well regarded for its quality and spirit by literary aficionados of the day. Traubel signed most his later work in the journal "T.", previously "H. T." and "H. L. T."

During the years 1903 to 1907 Traubel was associated with another literary magazine, The Artsman, which he edited along with William Lightfoot Price and Hawley McLanahan. The Artsman was associated with the Rose Valley Association, part of the international Arts and Crafts movement of the day.

Traubel was a dedicated socialist and was among the founders of The Worker, a socialist weekly newspaper in New York City that was later transformed into the Socialist daily New York Call. Traubel was the author of many unsigned editorials in early issues of that paper and contributed a daily essay, often dealing with a spiritual topic. Many of Traubel's essays from The Worker were eventually collected into hard covers as a book entitled Chants Communal. Traubel was a regular correspondent of a number of leading political radicals of his day, including Socialist Party leader Eugene V. Debs, anarchist Emma Goldman, Helen Keller, and California novelist Upton Sinclair.

A close personal friend and literary heir of Walt Whitman, Traubel was a key figure in memorializing the great American poet. During his own life Traubel managed to see into print three volumes on Whitman's life and philosophy during his final years. Six additional volumes of Traubel's With Walt Whitman in Camden were published posthumously, bringing the total to nine volumes.

=== Death and legacy ===
During his last few years Traubel's health failed him. He suffered a stroke in the summer of 1918 which paralyzed his left leg and impacted his vision. That fall he moved with his wife to stay with a friend in Norwich, Connecticut, but there his health became steadily worse.

In April 1919 Traubel moved to New York City staying at the apartment of his biographer, David Karsner. There he suffered a series of debilitating heart attacks from which he never fully recovered.

Although critically weak in his last days, Traubel decided to set out on one last trip at the end of the summer of 1919, setting out for Canada. He died early in September 1919 at Bon Echo, Ontario, near the city of Toronto. He was 60 years old at the time of his death.

Traubel's funeral, held Thursday, September 11, 1919, was interrupted when the church at which it was to be held, located at 34th Street and Park Avenue in New York City, burst into flames just as the hearse containing Traubel's body rolled up outside the building. About 1,000 people gathered at the scene, most of whom were present to attend the service, and a quick decision was made to relocate the funeral to the so-called "People's House," home of the Rand School of Social Science, located at 7 East 15th Street. When the gathering finally reassembled, several of Traubel's poems from Optimos were read in tribute, with Dr. Percival G. Wiksell of Boston presiding.

Traubel was buried in Harleigh Cemetery in Camden, New Jersey, close to Walt Whitman's tomb.

== Works ==
- At the Graveside of Walt Whitman, Harleigh, Camden, New Jersey, March 30th; and Sprigs of Lilac. Philadelphia, H.L. Traubel, 1892.
- Lowell-Whitman: A Contrast. Boston, Poet Lore, 1892.
- In re Walt Whitman. Editor, with Richard Maurice Bucke and Thomas Biggs Harned. Philadelphia: D. McKay, 1893.
- He Died for Us. Philadelphia: Conservator, 1902.
- Give All to Love. Philadelphia: Conservator, 1902.
- Make Room for Man. Philadelphia: Conservator, 1902.
- Put Money in Your Purse. Philadelphia: Conservator, 1902.
- The Soul of the Workman. Philadelphia: Conservator, 1902.
- Chants Communal. Boston: Small, Maynard & Co., 1904.
- With Walt Whitman in Camden (March 28-July 14, 1888). Boston: Small, Maynard, 1906.
- Optimos. New York: B.W. Huebsch, 1910.
- Five Traubel Songs. New York: n.p., 1912.
- The Master of Money is Dead. New York: Albert Boni, 1913.
- Collects. Albert and Charles Boni, 1914.
- Walt Whitman on Himself: From the Camden Diary of Horace Traubel. New York: Alfred A. Knopf, 1924.
- With Walt Whitman in Camden: January 21 to April 7, 1889. Sculley Bradley, ed. Philadelphia: University of Pennsylvania Press, 1953.
- Heart's Gate: Letters between Marsden Hartley & Horace Traubel, 1906-1915. Highlands, NC : Jargon Society, 1982.
