= Tabor Grand Opera House =

Opera house in Denver, United States

Coordinates: 39.7472°N 104.9956°W

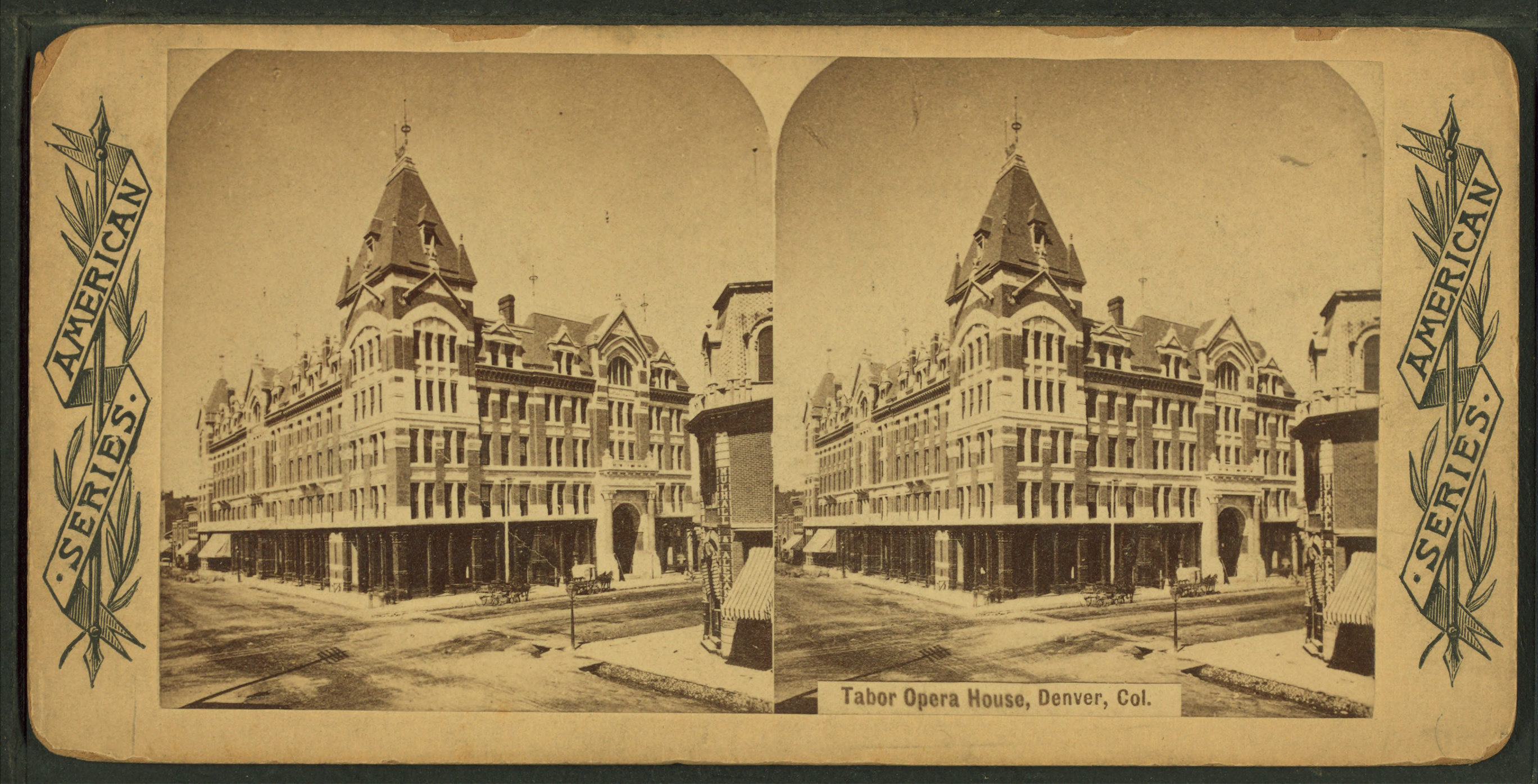
Contemporary stereoscopic view of Tabor Grand Opera House

The Tabor Grand Opera House, not to be confused with the Tabor Opera House of Leadville, was a Denver opera house and theatre built and subsidized by the silver magnate Horace Tabor and his first wife Augusta Tabor.

== Description ==
Located on Denver's Sixteenth Street, the high street of central-city Denver, the 1881 opera structure was meant to serve as a gathering place for the cream of Colorado's early-statehood society. The building was constructed in the Second Empire style to house and produce grand operas and live theatrical performances.

Horace Tabor's finances were affected by his divorce from Augusta in 1882–83. With the collapse of Tabor's mining interests in the silver crash of 1893, the Grand Opera House went into a decline. Tabor liquidated his interest in the theatre in 1896. Under new management, the performance space evolved from live stage events and became a movie theater. By the early 1960s it had become a grindhouse. The theater building was torn down by urban renewal leaders in 1964.

As of 2022 the spot where the Grand Opera House had stood was marked by a historical marker. The marker is sited at N 39°44.833, W 104°59.717.
