= John Moriarty (conductor) =

American conductor (1930–2022)

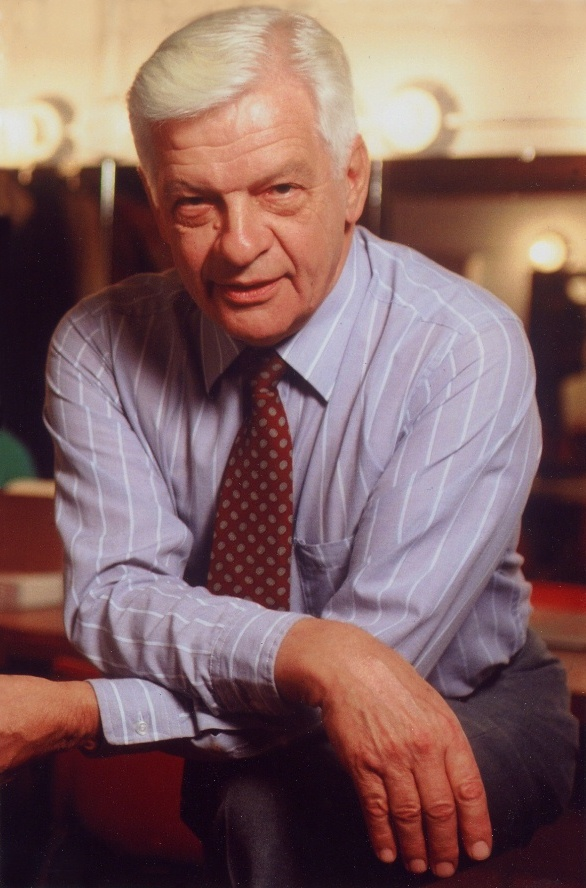
John Moriarty

John Moriarty (September 30, 1930 – January 5, 2022) was an American conductor and stage director of productions at opera companies throughout the United States. He was also noted vocal coach and accompanist.

== Early life and education ==
Moriarty was born in Fall River, Massachusetts, on September 30, 1930. He received a Bachelor of Music (1952) with highest honors and honorary Doctor of Music (1992) from the New England Conservatory of Music. He studied at Brandeis University and Mills College. He studied piano with Egon Petri, Paolo Denza, and Carlo Zecchi and French vocal literature with Pierre Bernac.

== Career ==
He served the Central City Opera for twenty years through the 1998 season. He was artistic director from 1982 to 1998; and was artistic director emeritus from 1998 until his death. He was artistic administrator at the Santa Fe Opera and the Washington Opera Society, and administered apprentice artist programs at Santa Fe, Lake George, Wolf Trap, and Central City. He was conductor and/or stage director with these companies and with Opera Theatre of St. Louis, the Colorado Symphony at Red Rocks Amphitheater, Wolf Trap, Boston Lyric Opera, and Oklahoma City Opera. He was chairman of the Opera Department at the New England Conservatory from 1989 to 2001.

Moriarty was known as one of the USA's most distinguished vocal coaches and accompanists. He conducted master-classes and workshops across the United States and at the National Association of Teachers of Singing national convention. He was piano soloist with the Boston Pops, the Boston Civic Symphony, and the Radio Éireann Orchestra of Dublin.

== Publications and recordings ==
He published numerous articles and was the author of Diction. Together with Professor Duane A. Smith of Fort Lewis College in Durango, Colorado, he was co-author of the book The Ballad of Baby Doe, a study of the Central City Opera and its production history (University Press of Colorado, 2002).

Moriarty made several recordings, including conducting the first recording of Händel’s opera Tamerlano and others of orchestral works. He accompanied Carole Bogard on three recital records covering Fauré, Debussy, Bizet, Gounod, Charpentier and Le Groupe des Six. Most recently he conducted the Central City Opera digital recording of The Ballad of Baby Doe.

== Recognition and honors ==
The John Moriarty Presidential Scholarship, which supports the studies of opera singers at the New England Conservatory, and the John Moriarty Encouragement Award are named in his honor. The John Moriarty Award of the Central City Opera is named in his honor and annually presented by him at the final performance of the festival. Colorado Governor Roy Romer declared June 17, 1998 as John Moriarty Day "for his uncompromising dedication to artistic excellence." He was also a Trustee Emeritus of the William Matheus Sullivan Foundation.

In 1985, he was honored with a Tribute from the Colorado General Assembly, and in 2018 he received the Lifetime Achievement Award from the National Opera Association. On August 10, 2008; "A" Street in Central City was renamed Moriarty Lane by the Mayor of Central City.

== Death ==
Moriarty died on January 5, 2022, at the age of 91.
