= Matchless Mine =

Coordinates: 39°15′22″N 106°16′16″W

- U.S. National Register of Historic Places
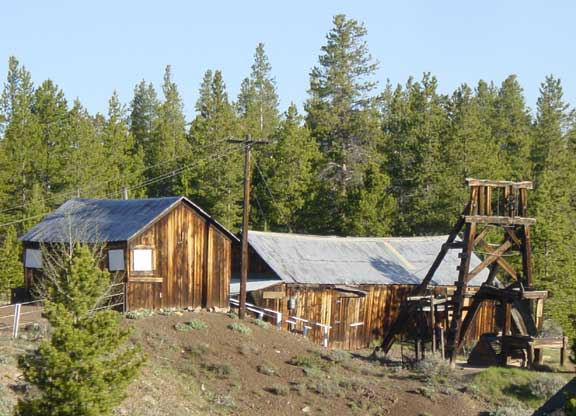
- Matchless mine and Baby Doe Tabor cabin
- Location: E 7th Rd., Leadville, Colorado
- MPS: Mining Industry in Colorado, MPS
- NRHP reference No.: 10001088
- Added to NRHP: December 12, 2010

The Matchless Mine is a historic mine located in Lake County, Colorado. It is listed on the National Register of Historic Places, and is part of the National Mining Hall of Fame and Museum.

== History ==
The Matchless Mine made Horace Tabor's fortune. It was purchased by Tabor in September 1879. His wife, Baby Doe Tabor, died in the superintendent's cabin.

According to legend, Tabor’s dying instructions to his wife were: “Hold onto the Matchless mine, it will make millions.” After some years in Denver, Baby Doe moved into a cabin next to the mine. She lost the mine in 1927, when it was sold to satisfy a debt, but the new owners allowed Baby Doe to stay in the cabin.

In the winter of 1935, after a snowstorm, some neighbors noticed that no smoke was coming out of the chimney at the Matchless Mine cabin. Investigating, they found Baby Doe, her body frozen on the floor.

== See also ==
- National Register of Historic Places listings in Lake County, Colorado
