= Augusta Tabor =

American philanthropist (1833–1895)

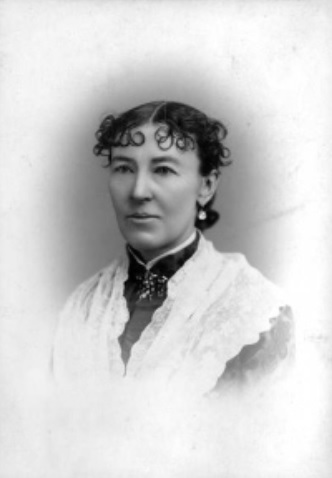
Augusta Pierce Tabor

Augusta Pierce Tabor (March 29, 1833 – January 30, 1895) was the wife of a merchant and miner, Horace Tabor, the first white woman to live in the Idaho Springs mining camp, and a Denver philanthropist. She was inducted into the Colorado Women's Hall of Fame in 1991 for her contributions to social service and philanthropy.

== Early life ==
Augusta Pierce was born in Augusta, Maine on March 29, 1833. Her father, William B. Pierce, owned a quarry and was a contractor. Augusta, one of ten children and the third of seven girls, suffered poor health during her childhood. She is described as being tall, lithe and beautiful with thick dark hair and was determined and charming. Augusta was a debutante, grew up in a pampered lifestyle, and believed in women's rights. She was the cousin of Franklin Pierce, president of the United States.

== Marriage ==
William B. Pierce hired Horace Tabor to supervise stone-cutters who worked on the construction of a mental institution (called an insane asylum at the time) in Augusta, Maine. Augusta Pierce met Horace and they fell in love. Augusta and Horace made a plan to move west to Kansas Territory to help populate the territory with anti-slavery supporters. First, though, Horace traveled to Kansas and worked to save money to get married. He arrived with other members of the New England Emigrant Aid Company in 1855. Horace worked at Fort Riley as a stonemason, and he fought with others to defend the town of Lawrence against pro-slavery men during the Sacking of Lawrence.

A member of the Free Soil Party, Tabor was elected to the Topeka Legislature.

Augusta was married to Horace Tabor on January 31, 1857, becoming Augusta Tabor. After their marriage at her family's home in Maine, the couple farmed for two years along Deep Creek in Zeandale, Kansas (known today as Tabor Valley). They had a son named Nathaniel Maxcy, who was also known as Maxey.

== Colorado ==
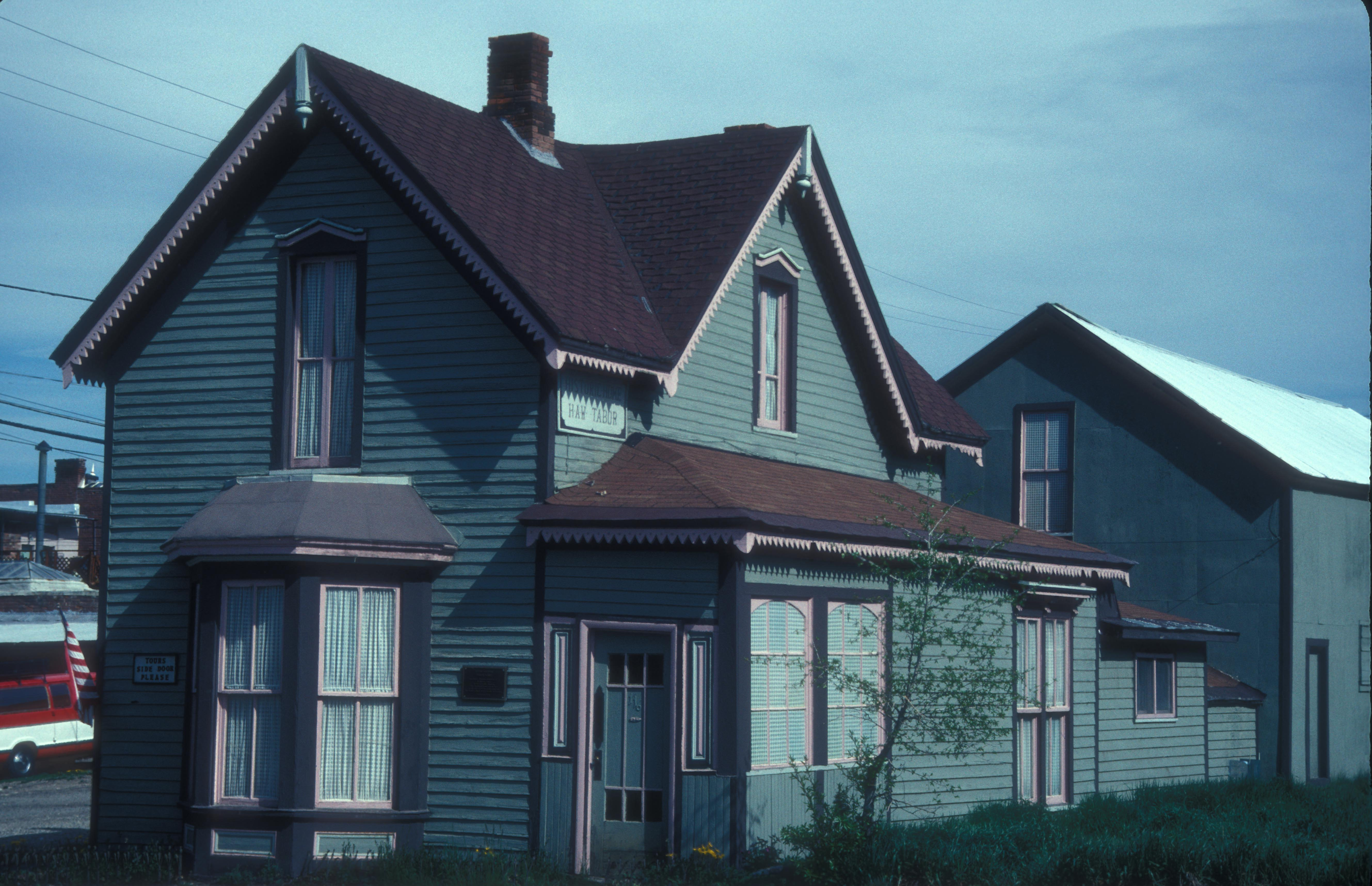
Augusta and Horace Tabor's house in Leadville

Augusta and Horace Tabor lived in the Idaho Springs mining camp before moving to Leadville. The Tabors established a store and Augusta made money as a washerwoman and as a landlady to boarders. Horace mined for gold in the mountains of Colorado and in 1878, after 20 years, he struck a silver vein that made US$10,000 (equivalent to $333,621 in 2025) per day.

The Tabors established a mansion in Denver after Horace was elected lieutenant governor later in 1878. The 20-room mansion, built at Eighteenth and Broadway for $40,000 (equivalent to $1,334,483 in 2025), was operated as a boarding house after Horace left her for Elizabeth "Baby Doe" McCourt. Augusta was landlady for up to 14 people at a time and was engaged in community activities, such as contributing to civic projects and charities and hosting fund-raising events. Tabor was particularly involved in the Pioneer Ladies Aid Society.

== In culture ==
With then-husband Horace, Augusta was a co-developer of the Tabor Grand Opera House (1881), Denver's first opera-quality theatrical performance space. Augusta Tabor is a major character in the opera The Ballad of Baby Doe by Douglas Moore and John Latouche; the role was created by Martha Lipton at the opera's 1956 premiere. A noted interpreter of the part was Frances Bible, who recorded it in 1961.

== See also ==
- Leadville mining district
- Pike's Peak Gold Rush

== Bibliography ==
- Gandy, Lewis Cass (1934). The Tabors, a footnote of western history. The Press of the Pioneers, Inc.
- Jackson, Julie, writer and director (November 17, 2016). The Tabors (Documentary) (video). Colorado Experience. Rocky Mountain PBS – via PBS. For more information about the documentary, see IMDB.
