= The Ballad of Baby Doe =

Opera by Douglas Moore

- Opera by Douglas Moore
- Librettist: John Latouche
- Language: English
- Premiere: July 7, 1956; Central City Opera, Colorado

The Ballad of Baby Doe is an opera by the American composer Douglas Moore that uses an English-language libretto by John Latouche. It is Moore's most famous opera and one of the few American operas to be in the standard repertory. Especially famous are the title heroine's five arias: "Letter Aria," "Willow Song," "I Knew it Was Wrong", "Gold is a Fine Thing", and "Always Through the Changing." Horace Tabor's "Warm as the Autumn Light" is also frequently heard. Distinguished sopranos who have portrayed Baby Doe include Beverly Sills (Moore's favorite interpreter of the role), Ruth Welting, Karan Armstrong, Faith Esham, and Elizabeth Futral.

The opera's premiere took place at the Central City Opera in Colorado in 1956. Hanya Holm and Edwin Levy directed the production, and sopranos Dolores Wilson and Leyna Gabriele alternated in the title role. The opera's New York premiere, directed by Vladimir Rosing, was presented at the New York City Opera in 1958. This revised version added the gambling scene in Act 2 and an additional aria for Baby Doe. Further revisions were being considered, but these were abandoned upon the sudden death of Latouche.

Based on the lives of historical figures Horace Tabor, a wealthy mine owner; his wife Augusta Tabor; and Elizabeth "Baby" Doe Tabor, the opera explores their lives from Horace and Baby Doe's meeting to the death of Horace. "Always Through the Changing" is a postscript ending foretelling Baby's death.

== Roles ==
Role	Voice type	Premiere Cast, 7 July 1956 (Conductor: Emerson Buckley)
Elizabeth "Baby" Doe	coloratura soprano	Dolores Wilson
Horace Tabor	baritone	Walter Cassel
Augusta Tabor	mezzo-soprano	Martha Lipton
Mama McCourt	contralto	Beatrice Krebs
Samantha	soprano	Joyce Maiselsen
Silver Dollar	soprano	Patricia Kavan
William Jennings Bryan	bass-baritone	Lawrence Davidson
President Chester Arthur	tenor	Alan Smith
Father Chapelle	tenor	Howard Fried
Old Silver Miner, Clerk at the Claredon Hotel, Mayor of Leadville, Stage Doorman, Sam, Bushy, Two Washington Dandies	tenors	
Sarah, Mary, and Kate	sopranos	
Elizabeth	child soprano	
Adult Silver Dollar, Emily, Effie, Samantha	mezzo-sopranos	
Bouncer, Albert, Hotel Footman, Denver Politician, Barney, Jacob, Two Washington Dandies	baritones	
Child Silver Dollar	silent role	

== Plot ==
=== Act I ===
Scene 1

The story begins by commenting on the riches of the Matchless Mine and Horace Tabor's ownership and control over the whole town of Leadville, Colorado. Horace sings "It's a Bang Up Job" to the townspeople, praising his new opera house, and sharing his disenchantment with his wife Augusta. During intermission at a performance at the opera house, Augusta chides Horace for not acting according to his upper-class station in life. Horace pleads with her not to insult the common people, equating the prostitutes' and bar girls' work to the work her committee did in helping build the opera house. Near the end of intermission, a woman arrives, introduces herself to Horace, and asks if he could direct her to her hotel. He obliges her, and returns to the opera with Augusta.

Scene 2

Augusta retires for the evening, while Horace steps outside to smoke a cigar. He overhears two women speaking about the woman he helped and learns that her name is Baby Doe, and that she has a husband in Central City. Horace hears Baby singing "The Willow Song" and applauds her. She is surprised as she did not know he was listening. He sings "Warm as the Autumn Light" to her. Augusta's comments from upstairs stop the scene.

Scene 3

Several months later, Augusta goes through Horace's study and finds gloves and a love letter. She thinks they are for her until she realizes that they are for Baby Doe. The rumors have been true. Horace comes in, they fight, and Horace says he never meant to hurt her.

Scene 4

Baby Doe, at the hotel, realizes she must end her relationship with Horace. She asks the hotel workers to find out when the next train leaves for Denver. They go to find Horace so he can head her off. She sings of her love for Horace in a letter to her mother (the "Letter Aria"). Augusta comes in and tells Baby to leave. She agrees, but pleads that she and Horace have done nothing they should be ashamed of ("I Knew It Was Wrong"). After Augusta leaves, Baby decides against leaving when Horace arrives. They sing of their love.

Scene 5

A year later, Horace has left Augusta and is living with Baby Doe. Her friends tell Augusta, now living in Denver, that Horace plans to divorce her. She swears to ruin him.

Scene 6

Horace and Baby Doe's wedding party is set in Washington DC. Baby's mother praises the couple's riches, but society wives deride Baby Doe. When the couple enter, they are formally well received. The debate turns to the silver standard, and Baby Doe sings "The Silver Aria". Horace presents Baby with the Spanish Queen Isabella's historic diamond necklace. Baby Doe's mother tells the Roman Catholic priest about Baby and Horace's divorces—which he didn't know of. Scandal rocks the party, but simmers down when President of the United States Chester Arthur comes in and toasts the couple.

=== Act II ===
Act II chronicles the disintegration of Baby and Horace's riches. Augusta warns of the gold standard, but Horace doesn't listen. Horace politically backs William Jennings Bryan for president. When Bryan loses, Horace is abandoned by his party.

In the final scenes, Horace asks to see the opera house he built so long ago, although he no longer owns it. On the stage, he hallucinates and sees people from his past. Augusta both taunts and pleads with him. He is told that one of his daughters will decry the name Tabor and the other will become a prostitute. Distraught, he collapses. Baby Doe enters. After he is convinced that she is not a hallucination, he tells her nothing will come between them, and begs her to remember him. He dies in her arms.

In the last scene, which takes place 30 years later at the Matchless Mine, she finishes the opera with "Always Through the Changing."

== Discography ==
Year	Cast (Baby Doe, Horace, Augusta, Chester A. Arthur, William Jennings Bryan, Mama McCourt, Father Chapelle)	Conductor, Opera house and orchestra	Label
1959, June 1–30 studio: Manhattan Center	Beverly Sills; Walter Cassel; Frances Bible; Jack DeLon; Joshua Hecht; Beatrice Krebs; Grant Williams	Emerson Buckley; Chorus and Orchestra of New York City Opera	LP: MGM Records; CD: re-released by Deutsche Grammophon in 1999 and 2006
1976, April 21 filmed in New York	Ruth Welting; Richard Fredricks; Frances Bible; David Griffith; Richard McKee; Jane Shaulis; Howard Hensel	Judith Somogi; Chorus and Orchestra of New York City Opera	Video Recording for American television: Broadcast on PBS's Live from Lincoln Center
1996, Aug 1-31 studio: Central City Opera House	Jan Grissom; Brian Steele; Dana Krueger; Torrance Blaisdell; Mark Freiman; Myrna Paris	John Moriarty; Chorus and Orchestra of Central City Opera	CD: Newport Classic
2000 live in San Francisco	Ruth Ann Swenson; James Morris; Judith Forst	Stefan Lano; Chorus and Orchestra of San Francisco Opera	CD: Premiere Opera CDR 1085-2
2001 live in New York	Elizabeth Futral; Mark Delavan; Joyce Castle	George Manahan; Chorus and Orchestra of New York City Opera	CD: Premiere Opera CDR 7841-2
