= Tabor Opera House =

Opera house in Leadville, Colorado

Coordinates: 39°14′48″N 106°17′27″W

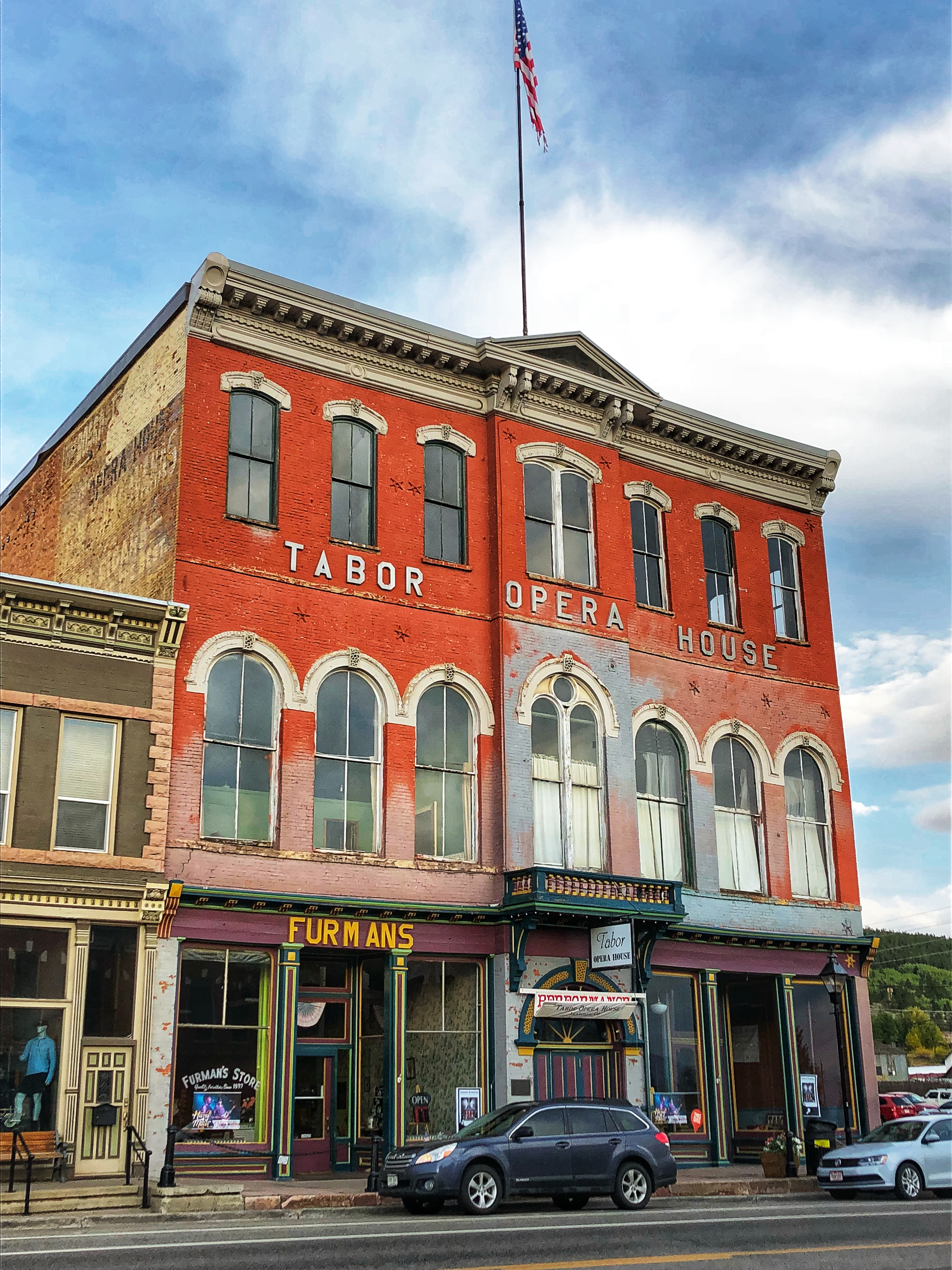
Tabor Opera House

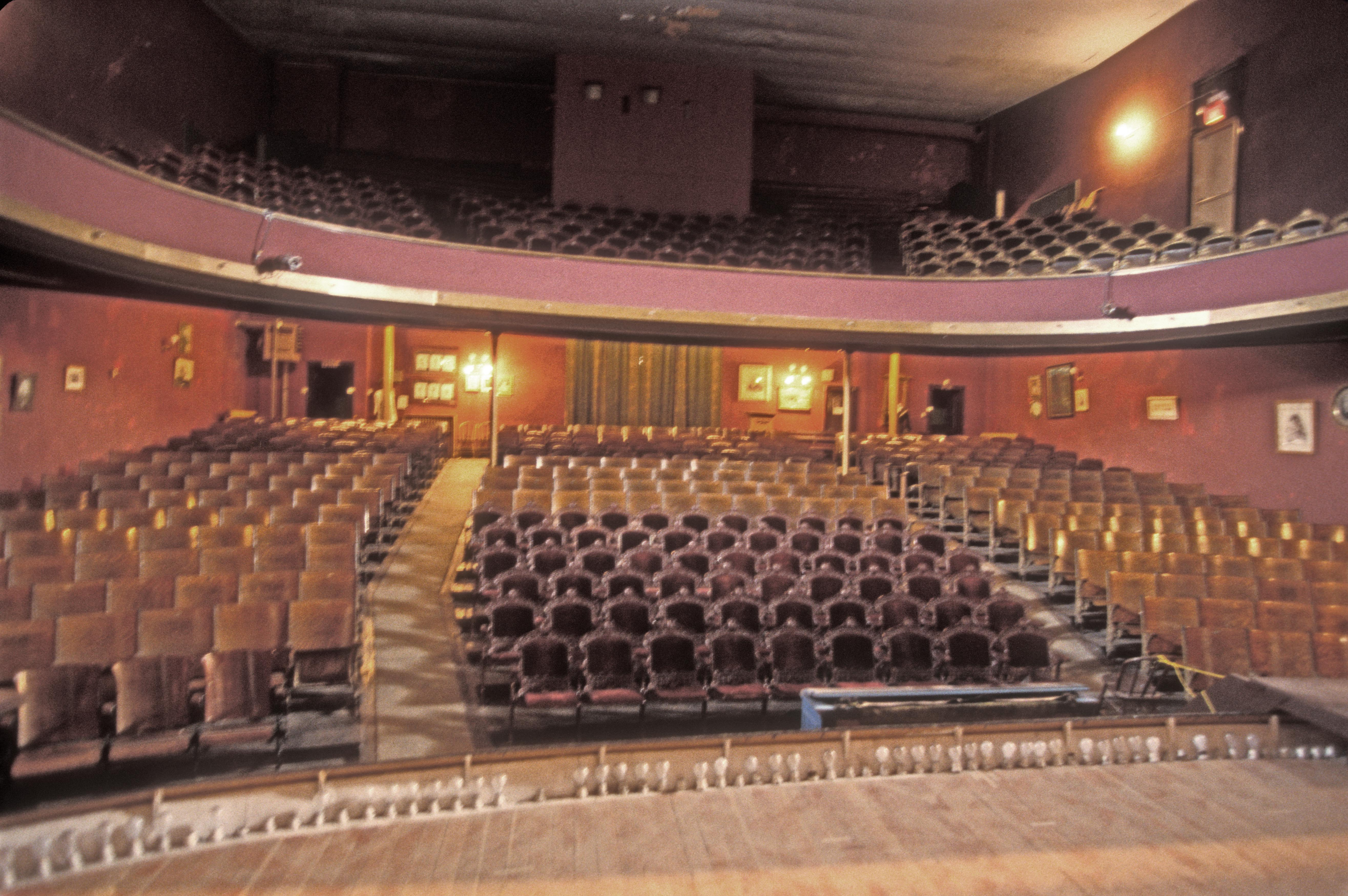
Interior of the Tabor Opera House

The Tabor Opera House is an opera house in Leadville, Colorado. Opened in 1879, The building has been designated a national treasure by the National Trust for Historic Preservation.

== History ==
Built by Horace Tabor, who went on to become the town's first mayor, it was the most costly structure in Colorado at the time, with materials being brought by wagons from Denver. The massive three-story opera house, constructed of stone, brick, and iron, was called "Leadville's finest brick structure". A 1935 newspaper article stated its cost to be "something under $75,000".

The Tabor Opera House opened on November 20, 1879, with its first production being a comedy called The Serious Family.

A March 1880 newspaper announcement advertised Kate Claxton and her husband Chas A. Stevenson in a double-bill running six nights. In April 1880 the program included Minnie Palmer in Minnie Palmer's Boarding School. On June 29, 1880, the funeral of Texas Jack Omohundro was held on the stage at the Tabor.

Following the 1893 collapse in the price of silver, after the repeal of the Sherman Silver Purchase Act, Tabor was forced to sell the Leadville opera house for $32,000 USD. The new owner, Algernon Weston, owned the opera house until his death in 1897. In 1901 the building was sold to the local Elks society, who reopened it in 1902 as the Elks Opera House.

In 1936 a fire broke out in the building's bar, caused by a cigarette dropped into the upholstery by a patron.

In 1955 the building was sold for $20,000 USD to Evelyn Furman, a resident of Leadville. Furman maintained the building, opening it occasionally for tours and performances, until her death in 2011.

In 2016 the city of Leadville purchased the building for $600,000 USD. The renovation of the building is overseen by a private non-profit society, the Tabor Opera House Preservation Foundation.

In 2020 Dr. Wendy Rae Waszut-Barrett of Historic Stage Services LLC, documented hundreds of stage settings delivered to at the Tabor Opera House in the 19th and 20th centuries. Many of the 19th century stage settings were even stored above the auditorium ceiling, lowered to the stage floor for assembly and cataloguing. There are currently fourteen theatre collections identified at the Tabor Opera House, scenery and stage machinery dating from 1879 to 1902. Dr. Waszut-Barrett published many of these onsite discoveries at www.drypigment.net.
