= Central City Opera =

Colorado opera company

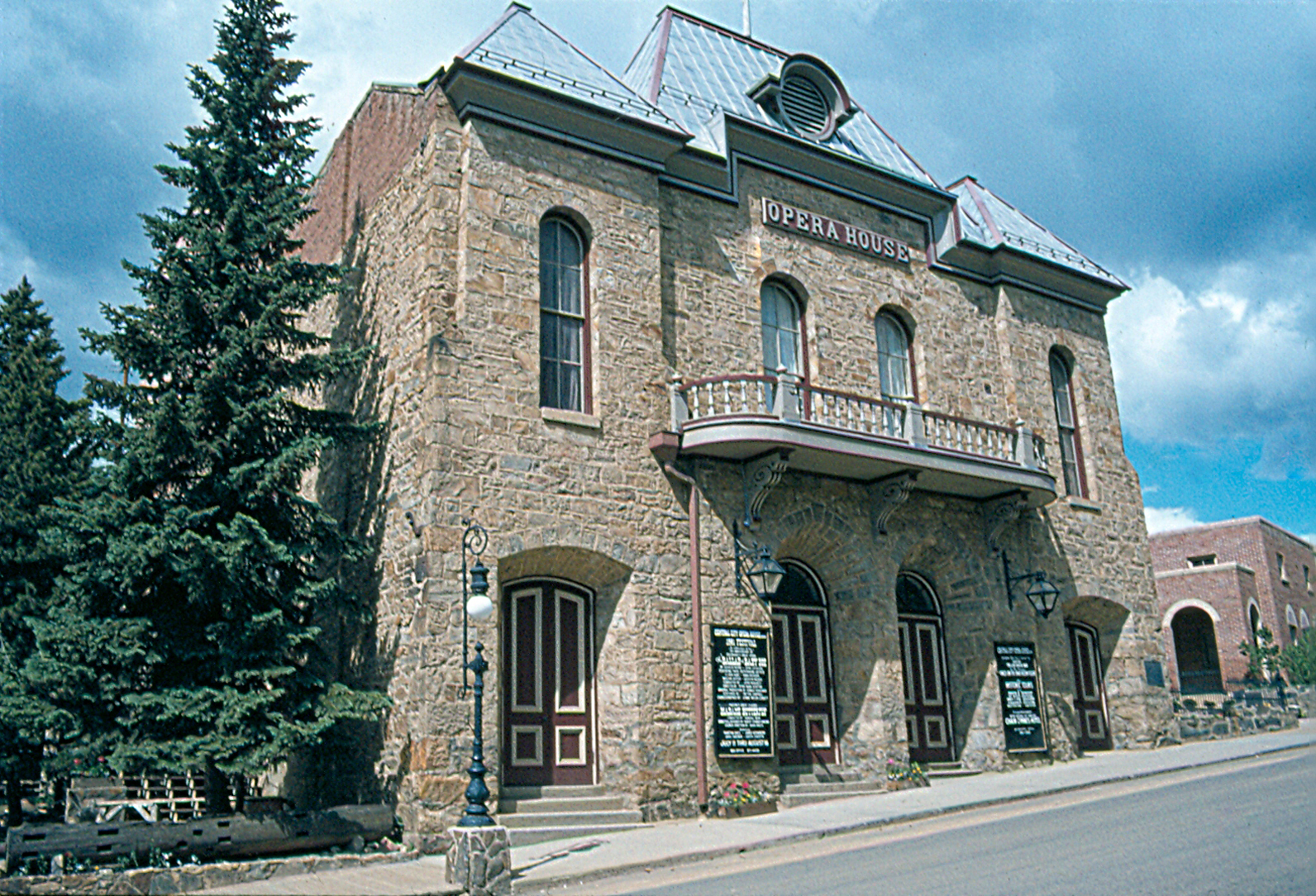
- The Central City Opera, 1982
- Formation: 1932
- Type: Opera company
- Location: Central City, Colorado
- President: Scott Finlay
- Website: centralcityopera.org

Central City Opera is the fifth-oldest opera company in the United States. Founded in 1932, each festival is presented in the 550-seat historic Central City Opera House built in 1878 in the gold mining era town of Central City, Colorado. Pelham G. Pearce was selected in 1996 as Managing Director for Central City Opera, and he was named General/Artistic Director in May 1998, when John Moriarty became Artistic Director Emeritus. Scott Finlay, current President and CEO, became the Director of Development at Central City Opera in 2011 and was appointed the President and CEO of Central City Opera in 2023.

Most recent six-week summer festivals have included both traditional and progressive works. About forty performances, including those specifically for young people, are presented each season. Additionally, Central City Opera presents festival extras including "Opera Scenes" (selected ten-minute opera scenes), and "Lunch and a Song" (solo luncheon performances) which are produced alongside the main opera season by Assistant Directors and training artists as part of the Bonfils-Stanton Foundation Artists Training Program. Other festival extras include "Apres Opera" (free impromptu performances by festival artists), "Opera Notes" (free pre-performance talks before main stage productions), and most recently, "Backstage Magic" (Q and A with the production team between Saturday shows) and “St. James Chamber Series” (concerts featuring CCO orchestra members before the day’s main stage matinee).

== Commissions ==
Successful commissions for the company include the American classic The Ballad of Baby Doe by Douglas Moore, premiered in 1956, and most recently produced in 2026, the popular one-act opera The Face on the Barroom Floor by Henry Mollicone, premiered in 1978 and the 2003 world premiere of Gabriel's Daughter, also composed by Henry Mollicone. The world premiere of Chinese opera, Poet Li Bai, commissioned by the Asian Performing Arts of Colorado, was presented in 2007.

== Artist training ==
Central City Opera's prestigious Bonfils-Stanton Foundation Artists Training Program, founded by Artistic Director Emeritus John Moriarty in 1978, has served for more than four decades as a national model for training young singers. The rigorous 10-week program integrates daily training in diction, movement, and stage combat with individual coaching, sessions in career management and rehearsals and performance opportunities in the summer's mainstage and auxiliary productions. The program selects 30-32 participants from nearly 1,000 applicants each year.

== Opera traditions ==
Noteworthy Opera traditions include the annual presentation of the Central City Flower Girls and the Yellow Rose Ball, Colorado's oldest debutante ceremony.

The Ushers Song (sung by the Usher Corps as they march up the street to open the theatre for each mainstage performance) is a Central City Opera fan favorite tradition that has continued on today. The Usher Corps, composed of collegiate and professional interns from all production and administrative departments, includes the traditional Bell Ringer to announce the time.

Lyrics for The Ushers' Song:
Well, what do you know, here we go / we're off to start the show.
You'll know who we are from afar; /frankly we sing better than the star.

We're the ushers, who show to your seat / then nonchalantly, we step upon your feet.
You may have bought a ticket / for Row A and seat 3.
But when we're through with you / you'll find you're in the balcony.

We're the ushers who heed your beck and call / yet when you need us, we're never there at all.
Our flashlights never working to show the pitfalls lurking / We're the ushers of the Central City show!

== See also ==
- List of opera festivals
