= Horace Tabor =

American prospector, businessman, and politician (1830–1899)

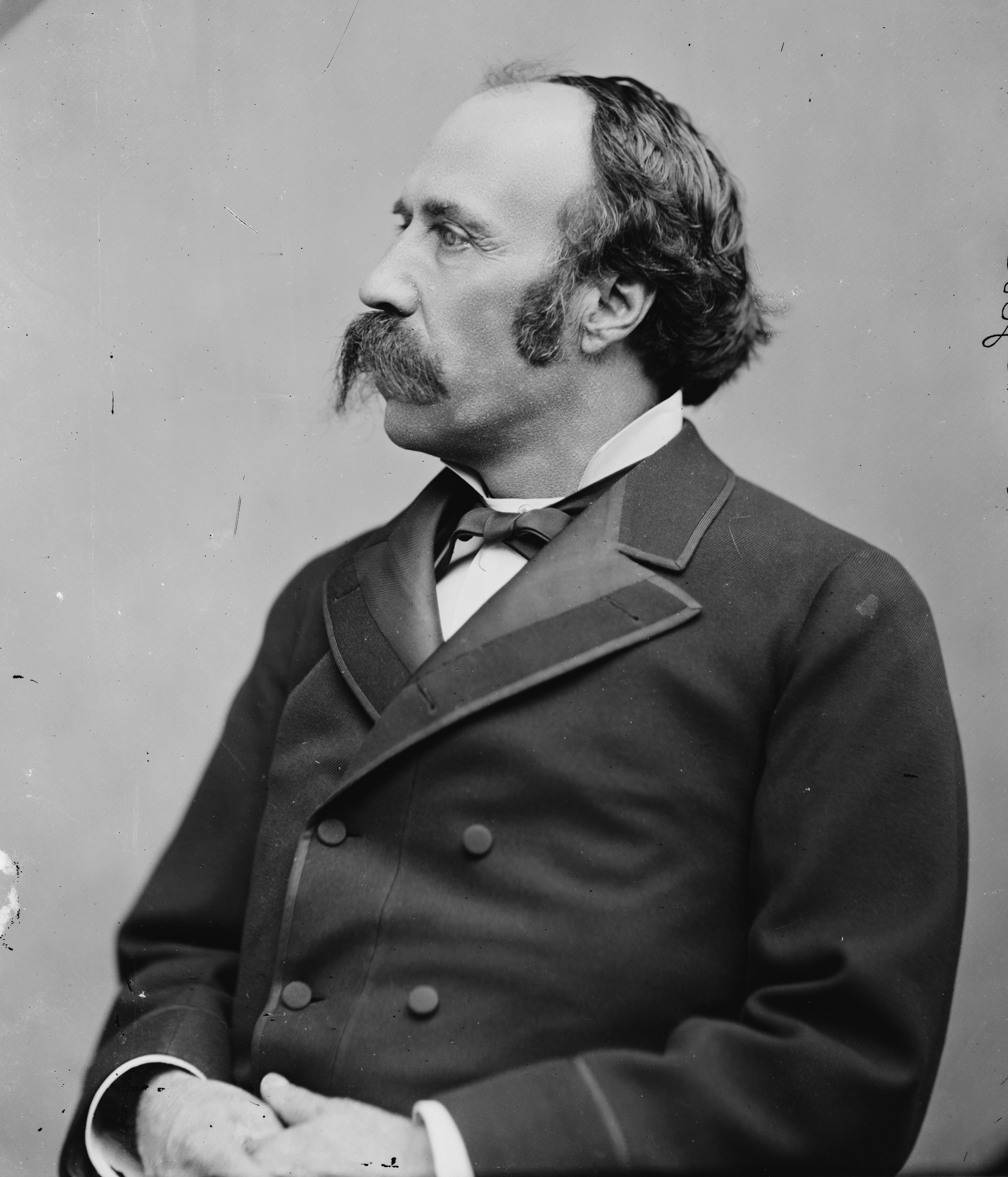

United States Senator from Colorado
- In office January 27, 1883 – March 3, 1883
- Preceded by: George M. Chilcott
- Succeeded by: Thomas M. Bowen

2nd Lieutenant Governor of Colorado
- In office January 14, 1879 – January 9, 1883
- Governor: Frederick Walker Pitkin
- Preceded by: Lafayette Head
- Succeeded by: William H. Meyer

Personal details
- Born: November 26, 1830 Holland, Vermont, U.S.
- Died: April 10, 1899 (aged 68) Denver, Colorado, U.S.
- Resting place: Mount Olivet Cemetery; Wheat Ridge, Colorado, U.S.
- Party: Republican

Horace Austin Warner "Haw" Tabor (November 26, 1830 – April 10, 1899), also known as The Bonanza King of Leadville and The Silver King, was an American prospector, businessman, and Republican politician. His success in Leadville, Colorado's silver mines made him one of the wealthiest men in Colorado. He purchased more mining enterprises throughout Colorado and the Southwestern United States, and he was a philanthropist. After the collapse in the silver market during the Panic of 1893, Tabor was financially devastated. He lost most of his holdings, and he labored in the mines. In his last year, he was the postmaster of Denver.

While married to Augusta Tabor, he had an affair with Elizabeth McCourt Tabor. He divorced Augusta and married Elizabeth, who became known as "Baby Doe". Their relationship was a scandal. When Tabor died, though, there were a reported ten thousand people who attended his funeral.

His life is the subject of Douglas Moore's opera The Ballad of Baby Doe and the 1932 Hollywood biographical movie Silver Dollar. Also, Graham Masterton's 1987 novel Silver has a protagonist named Henry T. Roberts, whose life includes incidents from Tabor's.

== Early life ==
Horace Austin Warner Tabor was born on November 26, 1830, to Cornelius Dunham and Sarah Ferrin Tabor in Holland, Vermont, near the state's border with Canada. His father was a farmer, who grew a number of grains, vegetables and fruits. In the winter months, Cornelius ran the district school, which Horace attended. The rest of the year Horace worked in the fields with his father and his brothers John and Lyman. They also raised cows, sheep, chickens and hogs. He had two sisters, Sarah and Emily. (Note: Wheeler stated that Tabor was one of five children, one girl and four boys.) The family lived in a drafty house without conveniences, such as water, electricity or a proper stove. In the fields, they used primitive tools that required labor by man or oxen. His mother died in 1846 at the age of 49, having succumbed to the hard work on the farm and childbearing. Cornelius soon remarried. By 1850, Betsy Tabor was his wife and five children with the Welch surname, from 11 to 19 years of age, lived with the Tabors.

At the age of 17 Horace served for two years as an apprentice granite cutter with his brother John in either Quincy or Boston, Massachusetts. Then he began to work as a journeyman throughout New England. In 1853, he was hired by a stone contractor, William Pierce, from Augusta, Maine, to supervise stone-cutters in the construction of an insane asylum there. Tabor met Pierce's daughter, Augusta, and fell in love with her, but was unable to support a wife yet.

== Kansas abolitionist and legislator ==
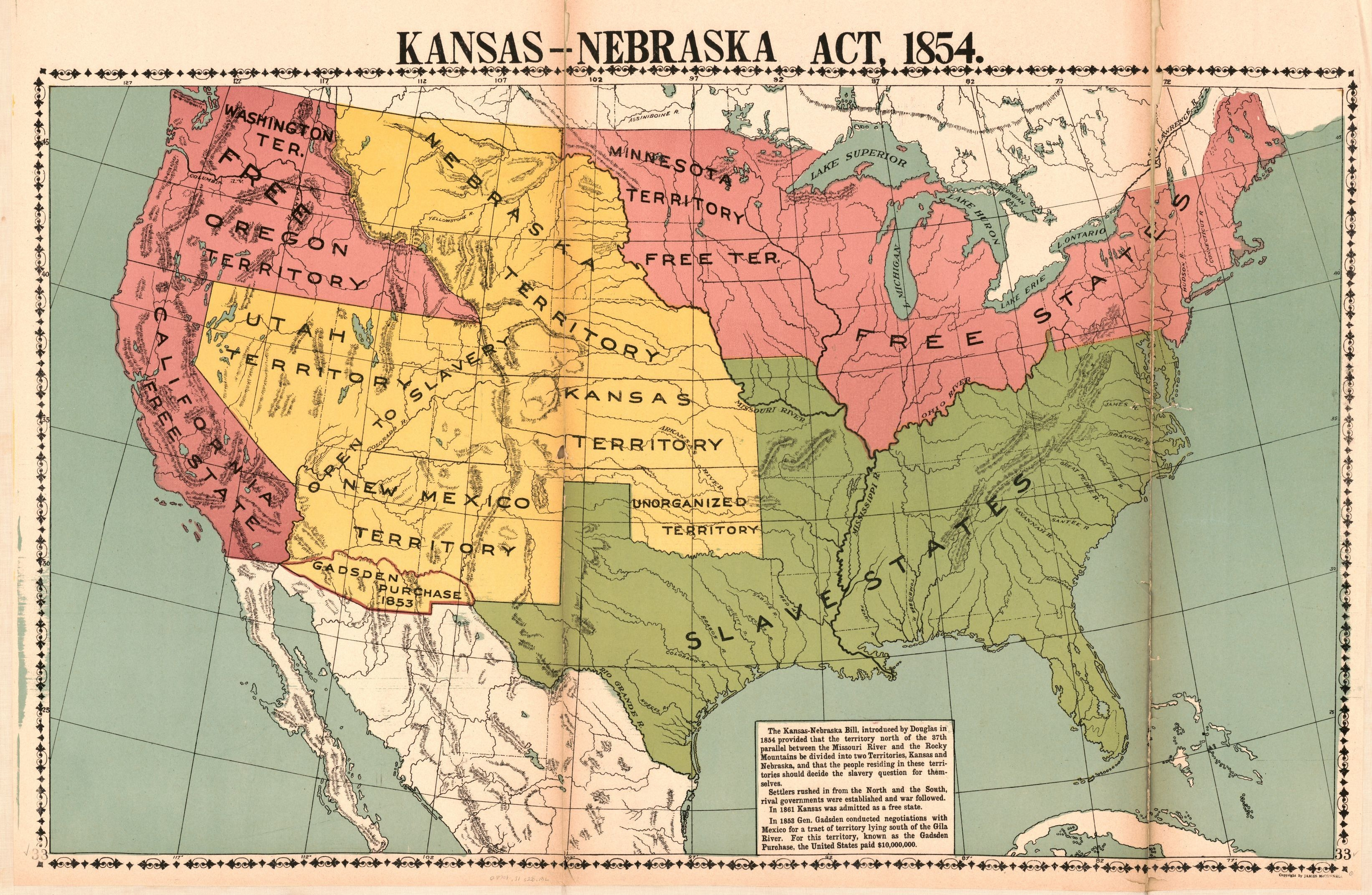
McConnell's historical map Kansas–Nebraska Act, 1854

Among the events leading up to the Civil War (1861-1865), there was a fight over what states and new territories would support slavery or not. At the same time, the California Gold Rush resulted in a lot of people moving west and the railroads helped get them there. The Kansas–Nebraska Act, which created the Kansas and Nebraska Territories, passed quickly by House of Representatives and the Senate and was swiftly enacted by President Franklin Pierce. The act repealed the Missouri Compromise which aggravated the dissension between pro-slavery and anti-slavery Americans.

Tabor and Augusta made a plan to ready themselves for marriage. Tabor would travel ahead to westward, get established, save some money, and return to Maine to marry Augusta. Together they would return to Kansas where they would fight for the abolition of slavery.

In 1855, Tabor departed with his brother John for the Kansas Territory with the New England Emigrant Aid Company to populate that territory with anti-slavery settlers. (Note: On July 2, 1777, Vermont (where Tabor was raised) was the first colony to ban slavery.) He worked at Fort Riley as a stonemason to earn enough money to get married.

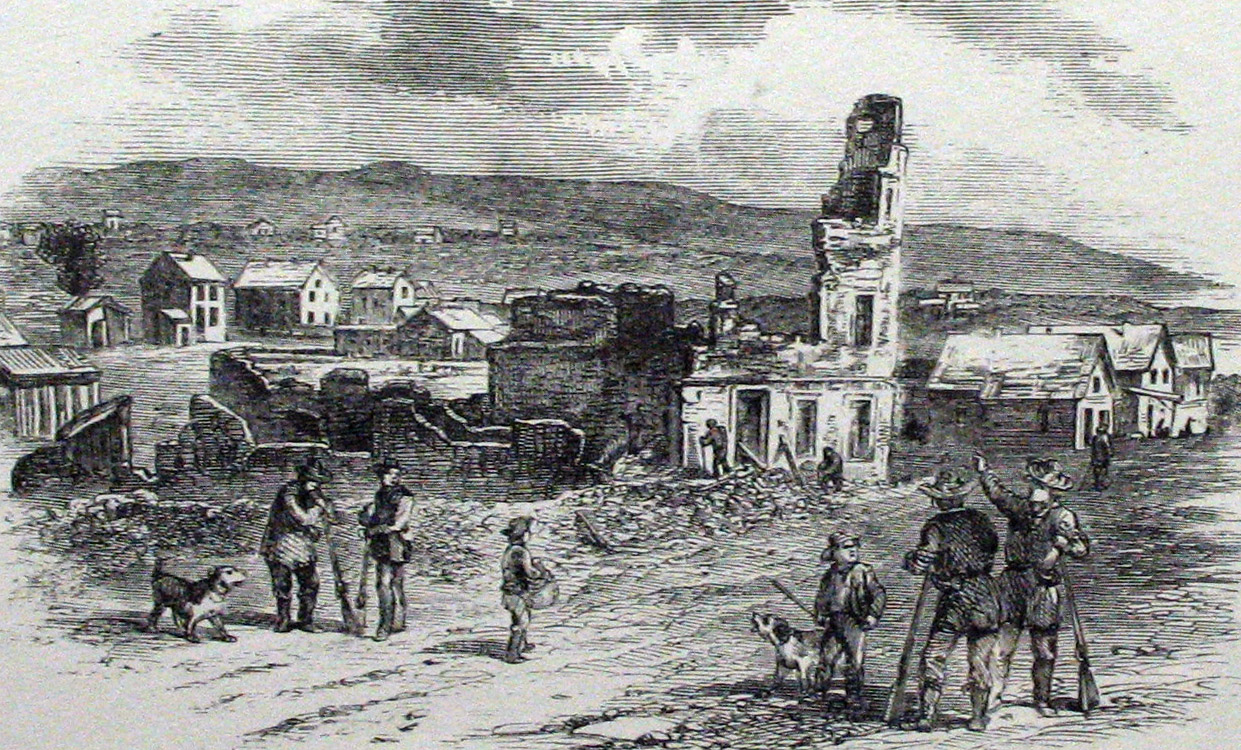
Ruins of Free State Hotel after the Sacking of Lawrence

He joined with other abolitionists, including John Brown, the firebrand who later led the raid on Harper's Ferry, to defend the town of Lawrence against pro-slavery men, which resulted in the Sacking of Lawrence.

A member of the Free Soil Party, Tabor was elected to the Topeka Legislature, but that body was soon dispersed by President Pierce at the point of a bayonet.

== Marriage to Augusta Pierce Tabor ==
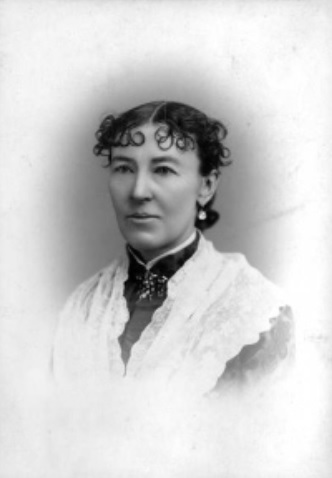
Augusta Pierce Tabor

Tabor married Augusta Pierce, the daughter of Lucy and William Pierce, on January 31, 1857. After their marriage at her family's home in Maine, the couple farmed for two years along Deep Creek in Zeandale, Kansas (known today as Tabor Valley). They had a son named Nathaniel Maxcy, who was also known as Maxey.

== Pike's Peak Gold Rush ==
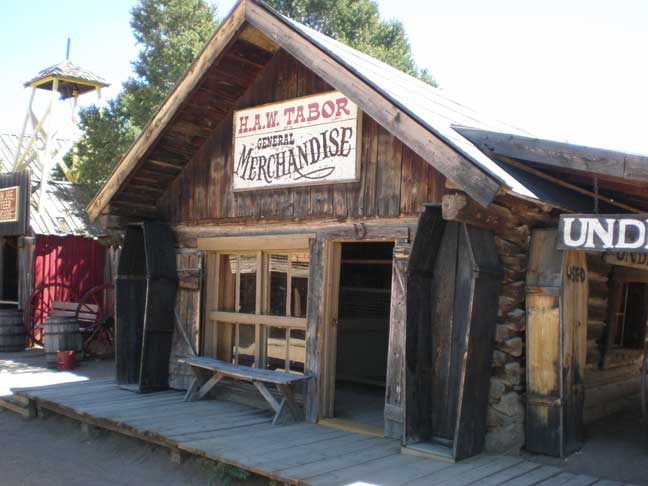
Tabor's general store, originally in Buckskin Joe, Colorado, now in the Buckskin Joe theme park near Canon City, Colorado

In 1859, the Tabors moved west during the Pike's Peak Gold Rush with other "Fifty-Niners" to Denver (in Kansas Territory at the time). (Note: There are a couple of sources that state that the Tabors moved to Colorado in 1850, but Tabor and Augusta were not married until 1857. They moved to Colorado in 1859.) Tabor, his wife, and son were transported by an oxen-driven covered wagon. After the six-week journey, they arrived in Colorado in April 1859. They were among the initial pioneers in what is now the state of Colorado. They went to several places looking to mine gold before going to California Gulch in Oro City, near present-day Leadville, in 1860. They began placer mining, and operated a small store there, but by 1861 the area was panned out.

They moved to Park County, (Note: Augusta Tabor recorded in her journal her first impression of the South Park area: "I shall never forget my first vision of the park. I can only describe it by saying it was one of Colorado's sunsets. Those who have seen them know how glorious they are.") settling in Laurette in South Park by 1862. The town of Laurette was later called Buckskin Joe. (Note: McGrath states that they were at California Gulch, Oro City until 1865.) They operated a store and beginning in 1863 Tabor was the postmaster of Buckskin Joe. Tabor prospected area mines while Augusta ran the store, took in laundry, and cared for boarders. Augusta, one of the few women in the state at the time, made most of the money for the family by operating the store, boarding people, cooking and managing the mail. Called an "angel of mercy", she also cared for her neighbors. In 1863, the family's net worth was approximately $13,000 (equivalent to $339,932 in 2025). Augusta managed their bookkeeping. She felt that the area was safe and invited her unmarried sister Lillian Pierce to join them in Buckskin Joe. Lillian arrived by April 22, 1862.

They left the area in 1868, upon hearing that there was a massive silver lode at the Printer Boy Mine in Oro City, which became part of Leadville in 1877. (Note: Oro City, which later became a ghost town, was located in what became the southern part of Leadville.) The Tabors moved there, where they operated a general store and Tabor was again a postmaster from April 1, 1878, to February 4, 1879.

In 1877, Tabor was elected the first mayor of Leadville. Tabor hired lawman Mart Duggan, who is credited with finally bringing Leadville's violent crime rate under control.

== Silver King ==
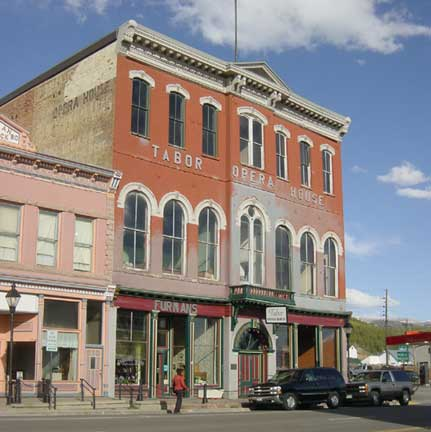
Tabor Opera House, Leadville, Colorado

When George T. Hook and August Rische were unable to pay for their supplies at the general store, Tabor accepted payment in the form of a grubstake agreement for one third of their profit on the Little Pittsburg mine. Tabor entered into a number of grubstake agreements with the prospectors, knowing he would receive no monies if they did not strike silver in the mine. Augusta strongly disagreed with this approach, who felt that they should save their money. On May 3, 1878, the mine revealed massive silver lodes and kicked off the Colorado Silver Boom. Tabor used the million or more (equivalent to $33,362,069 in 2025 per million) that he made from the sale of his interest in the Little Pittsburg mine in 1879 to invest in other holdings. He invested in the Chrysotile and the Matchless Mines, as well as mines in Cripple Creek, Aspen, the San Juan Mountains, and the southwestern United States. By 1879, he was one of the richest men in Colorado, with six million or more dollars (equivalent to $207,321,429 in 2025).

Tabor owned 4,600,000 acres of land in Colorado for grazing and 175,000 acres of land in Texas for copper mining. He sought enterprises, like irrigation canals, to provide work for laborers. In Honduras, he invested in ebony and mahogoney forests as well as mining and fruit operations.

In Leadville, he donated monies for water works, rail lines, schools, and churches. He established newspapers, a bank, and the Tabor Opera House in Leadville. He displayed his philanthropy by, for example, donating the land under the Temple Israel in Leadville in 1884. Tabor donated the money for the Tabor Grand Opera House, built the Tabor Block and La Veta Place, and invested in real estate and other businesses in Denver. Tabor became a partner of Marshall Field of Chicago, with whom he made millions of dollars.

In 1878, Tabor was elected Lieutenant Governor of Colorado and served in that post until January 1884. He served as U.S. Senator from January 27, 1883, until March 3, 1883, following the resignation of Henry M. Teller to become United States Secretary of the Interior in the administration of U.S. President Chester Arthur. He was the president of the Denver Chamber of Commerce and of the Board of Trade in 1891.

== Divorce ==
In 1879, the Tabors moved to Denver. Tabor's relationship with his wife, who preferred to save their money, began to fall as Tabor became a reckless spender and he continued to be a gambler and speculator. The couple then lived in separate residences, Augusta resided in their Denver mansion. Tabor moved into the Windsor Hotel in the city, where he entertained women. He had an affair with Elizabeth McCourt, nicknamed Baby Doe. Requiring money to support herself, by 1882 she took in boarders and she filed a suit against Tabor for financial support. Without Augusta's knowledge, Tabor attained a divorce in Durango, Colorado, in March 1882. Augusta filed for divorce on January 2, 1883, for desertion. She was awarded two properties worth a total of $250,000 (equivalent to $863,839 in 2025) or a settlement of $400,000 (equivalent to $1,382,143 in 2025) in late 1883.

== Marriage to Elizabeth Doe McCourt ==
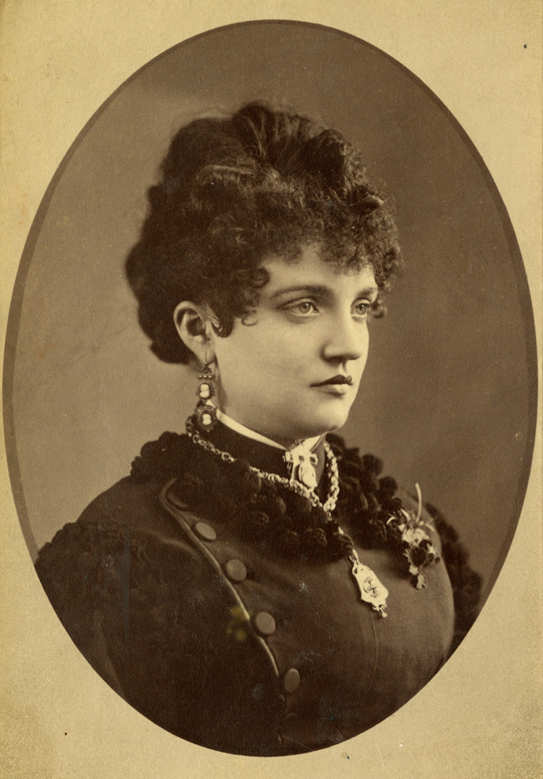
Elizabeth Doe "Baby Doe" McCourt, circa 1883

On March 1, 1883, Tabor finally married Elizabeth "Baby Doe" McCourt in Washington, D.C., leaving him a social outcast. The marriage produced two daughters, Elizabeth Bonduel "Lily" and Rosemary "Silver Dollar" Echo. During the initial years of their marriage, the Tabors lived a life of luxury, including extensive travel.

== Later years and death ==
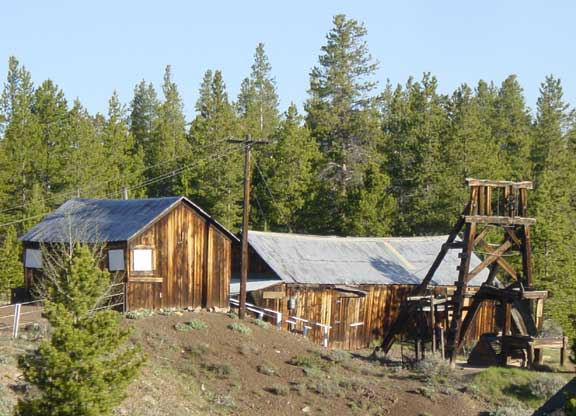
Matchless mine and Baby Doe Tabor cabin

Tabor ran without success for governor of Colorado throughout the 1880s. Then, in 1893, the repeal of the Sherman Silver Purchase Act in the administration of President Grover Cleveland caused the value of silver to drop, which devastated Tabor's fortune. His holdings, including his mansion in Denver, were sold off and he worked in the mines. He was made postmaster of Denver in 1898 and lived in the city at the Windsor Hotel.

When he became terminally ill with appendicitis in 1899, Tabor's final request of Baby Doe was that she maintain the Matchless claim. Following his death, flags were flown at half staff and the Aspen Tribune reported that ten thousand people attended his funeral. His body was interred at Mt. Calvary Cemetery in Denver and was later reinterred at Mt. Olivet Cemetery in Jefferson County, Colorado.

Baby Doe moved to Leadville and lived an impoverished life in the tool shed of the Matchless Mine. After dying from acute myocarditis in March 1935, she was buried alongside her husband in Mt. Olivet Cemetery.

Augusta Tabor fared better than her ex-husband. She made successful investments of her divorce settlement. On her death in 1895, she was among the wealthiest citizens of Denver, leaving half a million dollars (equivalent to $19,350,000 in 2025) to her son.

In Silver Dollar, the Story of the Tabors, published in 1932, author David Karsner related that William Jennings Bryan, the politician and orator, visited the Tabors in 1890 shortly after the birth of their second daughter. Hearing the baby gurgle, Bryan exclaimed: "Why Senator, that baby's laughter has the ring of a silver dollar!" The Tabors had not yet decided on a name for the girl, and this remark was the inspiration for her name: Rosemary Silver Dollar Echo Honeymaid Tabor.

After working as a newspaper reporter in Denver, Silver Dollar moved to Chicago and, living cheaply there, wrote a novel. Karsner wrote of Star of Blood, "The best that can be said of Silver's book is that it was printed – not published." It was unpopular.

Silver Dollar worked her minor celebrity for all it was worth, but after a string of burlesque and minor acting jobs, she spiraled even lower. The one-time "Girl of the Nile," says Karsner, liked heavy drinking and "Happy Dust." Going by the name of Ruth Norman, among many other aliases, after the men who supported her, she died at the age of thirty-five in 1925 by spilling a large kettle of boiling water on herself while she was extremely intoxicated.

== Legacy ==
Tabor Lake in Pitkin County, Colorado, at the base of Tabor Peak.

He was a prominent silver baron who "helped shape the foundation and the future of the Centennial State."

His life is portrayed in the film Silver Dollar and the opera The Ballad of Baby Doe.

== Bibliography ==
- Gandy, Lewis Cass (1934). The Tabors, a footnote of western history. The Press of the Pioneers, Inc.
- Jackson, Julie, writer and director (November 17, 2016). The Tabors (Documentary) (video). Colorado Experience. Rocky Mountain PBS – via PBS. For more information about the documentary, see IMDB.
- Lohse, Joyce B. (April 2011). Baby Doe Tabor: Matchless Silver Queen. Filter Press. ISBN 978-0-86541-107-4.

U.S. Senate
Preceded by George M. Chilcott	U.S. senator (Class 2) from Colorado; 1883; Served alongside: Nathaniel P. Hill	Succeeded by Thomas M. Bowen
Political offices
Preceded by Lafayette Head	Lieutenant Governor of Colorado; 1883–1885	Succeeded by William H. Meyer
