= David Karsner =

American journalist and political activist (1889–1941)

David Fulton Karsner (1889–1941) was an American journalist, writer, and socialist political activist. Karsner is best remembered as a key member of the editorial staff of the New York Call and as an early biographer of Socialist Party of America leader Eugene V. Debs.

== Biography ==
=== Early years ===
David Karsner was born March 13, 1889, at Baltimore, Maryland, the son of Cecil J. and Anita Karsner. The elder Karsner worked as an official at the Port of Baltimore.

Both of Karsner's parents died when David was still young and he wound up in a Baltimore orphanage and school for underprivileged boys.

=== Career ===
Karsner's journalistic career began about 1907 when he went to work for a newspaper in the city of Chicago. While in Chicago Karsner made the acquaintance of a number of socialist intellectuals, including Upton Sinclair, Jack London, and Carl Sandburg. His discussions with these led Karsner himself to become an advocate of socialism and to join the Socialist Party of America.

Karsner's journalistic career took him to Philadelphia, where he joined the staff of the Philadelphia Ledger, and to New York City, where he worked for the New York Tribune and the New York Post.

In 1911 Karsner married the Romanian-born socialist Rose Greenberg (1889–1968). The pair had a daughter, Walta Karsner, named after radical poet Walt Whitman. Following the dissolution of their marriage, Rose Karsner married James P. Cannon, regarded as the founder of American Trotskyism, while David Karsner remarried to Esther Eberson.

Karsner joined the editorial board of the New York socialist daily, the New York Call, editing that publication's weekend magazine section before gaining position of managing editor of that publication.

One of the major stories covered by Karsner during his time at The Call was the 1918 mass trial of 166 members of the Industrial Workers of the World held in Chicago before Judge Kenesaw Mountain Landis.

In April 1923 Karsner resigned from the financially struggling Call in protest over the paper's decision to publish a critique of Soviet Russia written by Francis McCullaugh, a member of the British secret service.

Disaffected from the increasingly conservative Socialist Party, Karsner turned to writing non-fiction, authoring biographies of President Andrew Jackson and radical abolitionist John Brown.

Another of Karsner's biographical works, a 1932 book on Colorado businessman and politician H.A.W. Tabor was made into a motion picture by Warner Brothers. The film starred Edward G. Robinson in the lead role and debuted in December 1932.

=== Death and legacy ===
David Karsner died of a heart attack on February 20, 1941. He was 51 years old at the time of his death.

His papers reside at the Tamiment Library and Robert F. Wagner Archives at New York University in New York City as collection TAM 430. Additional material is held by New York Public Library.

== Works ==
- "Carrying the Banner," International Socialist Review, vol. 12, no. 11 (May 1912), pp. 756–759.
- "Horace Traubel," The Western Comrade, vol. 1, no. 11 (March 1913), pp. 366–367.
- Debs Goes to Prison. New York: Irving Kay Davis and Co., 1919.
- Debs: His Authorized Life and Letters from Woodstock Prison to Atlanta. New York: Boni and Liveright, 1919.
- Horace Traubel: His Life and Work. New York: E. Arens, 1919.
- Talks with Debs in Terre Haute (and Letters from Lindlahr). New York: New York Call, 1922.
- "The Passing of the Socialist Party," Current History, vol. 20, no. 2 (June 1924).
- Sixteen Authors to One: Intimate Sketches of Leading American Story Tellers. Illustrations by Esther M. Mattsson. New York: Lewis Copeland Co., 1928.
- Andrew Jackson: The Gentle Savage. New York: Brentano's, 1929.
- Silver Dollar: The Story of the Tabors. New York: Covici-Friede, 1932.
- John Brown, Terrible "Saint." Illustrated by Esther Eberson Karsner. New York: Dodd, Mead and Co., 1934.
