= Cameron Peak fire =

2020 Wildfire in Colorado

- Part of the 2020 Colorado wildfires
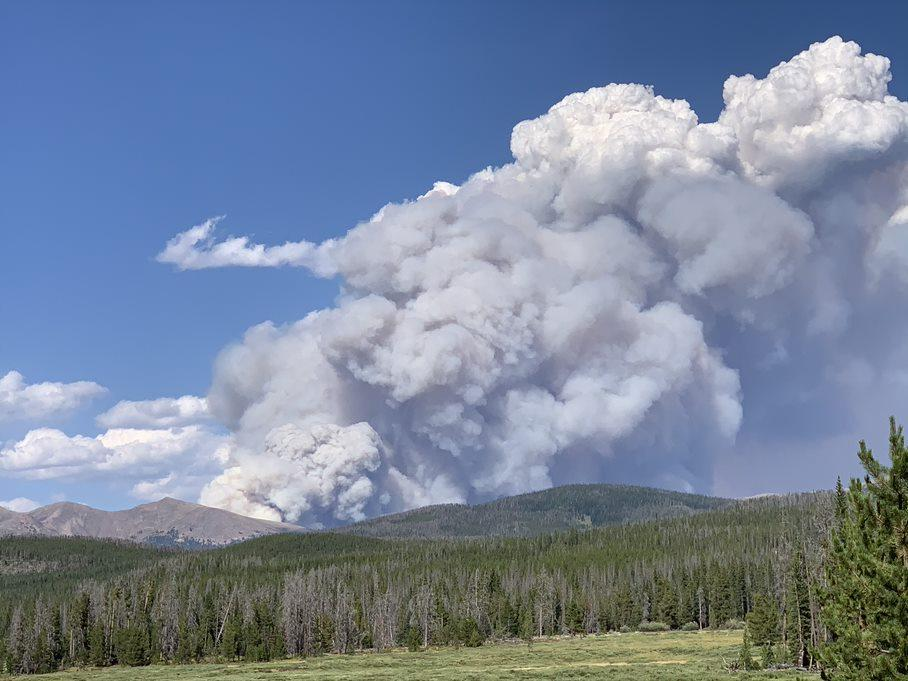
- Date: August 13, 2020 – December 2, 2020
- Location: Roosevelt National Forest, Larimer County, Colorado
- Coordinates: 40.589°N 105.404°W

Statistics
- Burned area: 208,663 acres (84,443 ha)

Impacts
- Deaths: 0 (6 indirect)
- Structures destroyed: 469

Ignition
- Cause: Unknown

Map
- Perimeter of Cameron Peak Fire
- Location within Colorado

The Cameron Peak fire was a wildfire that started near Chambers Lake, Colorado, 25 miles (40 km) east of Walden and 15 miles (24 km) southwest of Red Feather Lakes near Cameron Pass on August 13, 2020, and was declared 100% contained on December 2, 2020. The fire burned 208,663 acres (326 sq mi.) through the Arapaho and Roosevelt National Forests in Larimer and Jackson Counties and Rocky Mountain National Park. At its peak, the fire forced the evacuation of over 6,000 residents in Estes Park, Chambers Lake, Rustic, Glacier View Meadows, Red Feather Lakes (and surrounding areas), Masonville, Glen Haven, Spring Canyon, various small communities along Highway 14, Stove Prairie Landing Road, as well as the Colorado State University Mountain Campus and had over 1,000 personnel fighting the fire. 469 structures were destroyed by the fire, including 220 outbuildings and 42 primary residences. The fire became the largest wildfire in Colorado history, surpassing the Pine Gulch Fire, which had set the same mark just seven weeks prior.

== Development ==
=== August ===
The Cameron Peak fire was first reported by multiple hikers on August 13, 2020, around 1:48 p.m. MST in Roosevelt National Forest northwest of the Chambers Lake recreational area. The following day, the Colorado Department of Transportation (CDOT) closed Highway 14 from Rustic to Gould in response to fire activity near the highway. The fire crossed Highway 14 in a second location and spread rapidly, growing to 10,867 acres on August 16. Fueled by hot and dry weather and steep terrain, the fire burned through heavy beetle kill near Barnes Meadow Reservoir. The first use of aerial firefighting aircraft occurred the same day, with a DC-10 air tanker being called in for fire retardant drops on the north end of the fire. Helicopters began dropping water on the west side of Highway 14 and Long Draw Road the following evening, after winds had started pushing the fire in all directions. The first evacuation orders went into effect on the same day, with areas around Chambers Lake and Spencer Heights being the first to leave. The fire grew in all directions over the next several days, with more firefighting crews dispatched to handle containment. On August 22, the Highway 14 closure was extended east towards the Kelly Flats campground as the fire grew more towards the southeast. Rist Canyon Road was briefly closed due to another wildfire that broke out 3.5 miles (5.6 km) west of U.S. Route 287, but was quickly reopened. By the end of August, the fire was at 23,022 acres and 5% contained, with crews working west to east along Buckhorn Road and Crown Point Road to the Comanche Peak Wilderness to build fire lines. Despite relatively low humidity and hot weather, the fire grew slowly over the last two weeks of August, moving mostly east towards Comanche Peak and Crown Point.

=== September ===
Highway 14's closure was pulled back west to Rustic on September 1, as good firefighting conditions helped keep the fire suppressed. Heading into Labor Day weekend, red flag conditions were expected, as humidity dropped into the lower single digits and temperatures rose into the upper 70s and low 80s. An early snowstorm was forecast for the state at the end of the holiday weekend, with temperatures dropping from the upper 80s into the low 20s and upper teens, with it also bringing snow and preceding wind gusts over 50 miles per hour. The forecast winds drove an eastward expansion of the fire, resulting in an additional 70,000 acres burned between September 6 and 8. Mandatory evacuations were ordered for Lady Moon, Red Feather Highlands, Red Feather Lakes, Crystal Lakes, County Road 27 to Big Bear Road, Rist Canyon Road, and Highway 14 from Gateway to Stove Prairie Park. An additional 50 fire engines were ordered for structure protection along Highway 14, including Stove Prairie Road, Pingree Park and Buckhorn. The fire also moved into Rocky Mountain National Park and burned around 7,050 acres in the Cascade Creek, Hague Creek and Mummy Pass Creek areas. Smoke from the fire could be seen over the Colorado Front Range and in many cities, including Fort Collins and Estes Park, smoke was thick enough to block out the sun. Trail Ridge Road, the popular section of U.S. Route 34 through Rocky Mountain National Park was closed for many days due to the proximity of the fire and the potential for low visibility and heavy smoke. The subsequent snowstorm dropped 6-14 inches of snow on the fire, but only temporarily halted the spread.

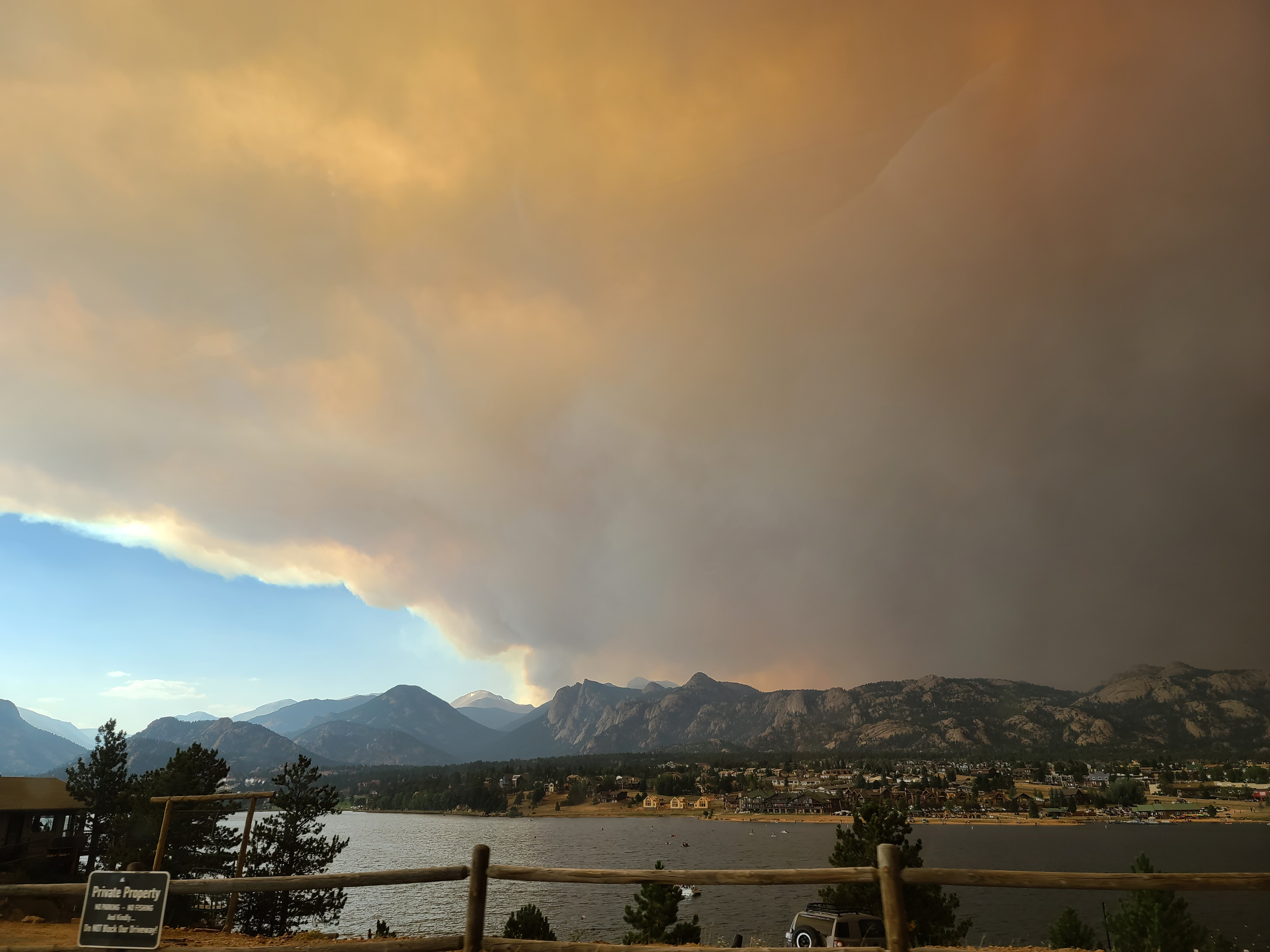
The Cameron Peak Fire burning in Estes Park

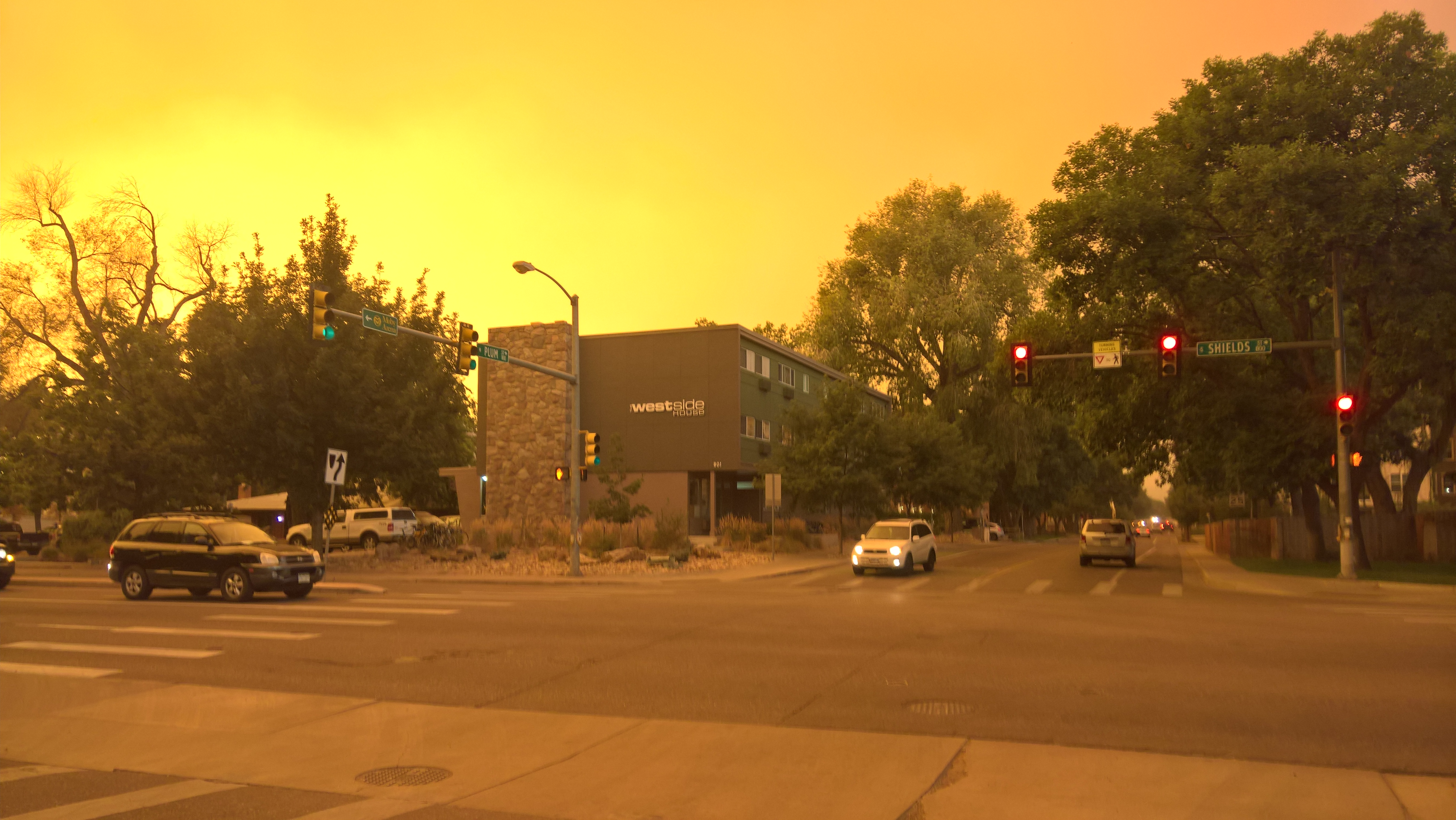
The smoke during Cameron Peak Fire in September, viewed from Fort Collins, Colorado

For the next week after the initial fire explosion, cooler temperatures and moisture kept the fire suppressed, leading to firefighters expanding containment on the fire to 15%, mostly on the western edge of the fire. Air tankers and helicopters were continuing to drop fire slurry and water on hot spots and fire lines in preparation for warmer temperatures and lower humidity. Red flag warnings were in effect for most of Colorado's Front Range, the following week as the fire grew another 8,000 acres to the east, subsequently grounding aircraft from fighting the fire. On the evening of September 27, wind gusts over 60 miles per hour pushed the fire northeast and southeast another 13,000 acres, resulting in mandatory evacuations reaching through the Highway 14 corridor once again, and many campsites on the northern end of Rocky Mountain National Park. Air quality alerts went into effect for many cities being affected by the wildfire smoke.

By the end of September, the fire had burned 125,006 acres (195 sq. mi.) and containment hovered around 30%. Firefighters were concentrating their efforts on the north side of the fire as to protect structures in the areas surrounding Kinikinik. Firefighters worked in unison across the fire with 11 helicopters to extinguish spot fires in the area and protect fire-lines heading into October.

=== October ===
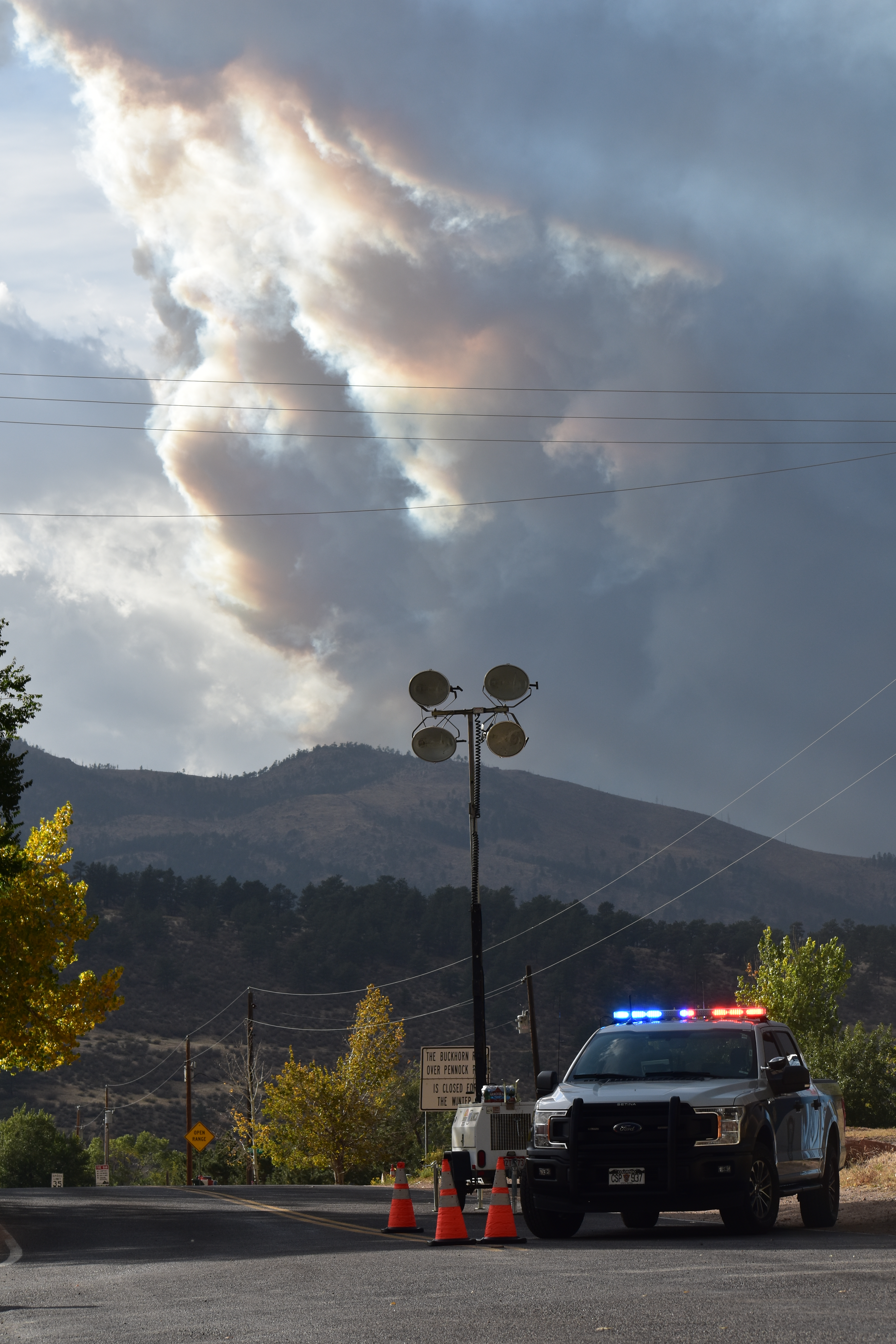
A Colorado State Patrol vehicle guarding Buckhorn Road as the Cameron Peak Fire burns in the background

Red flag conditions continued, as high winds grounded aircraft again and led to flare ups within the burning interior of the fire. By October 14, the fire had pushed almost 10 miles to the east, as difficult topography and wind conditions led to growth. On the same day, after 62 days of burning, the fire surpassed the Pine Gulch Fire, becoming the largest wildfire in Colorado history. Over the following night, the fire experienced its biggest growth since Labor Day weekend, growing by 30,000 acres. Easterly blowing winds, combined with rapid fire growth, led to large smoke plumes visible across the cities of Fort Collins and Loveland. On October 16, U.S. Route 34, a main east–west highway artery into Estes Park, was closed due to extreme fire behavior and emergency operations. By Sunday October 18, the fire had grown another 30,000 acres and became the first fire in Colorado history to surpass 200,000 acres burned. High winds pushed the fire's rapidly growing pyrocumulonimbus cloud over the cities of Fort Collins and Loveland and over the Colorado eastern plains. Smoke from the fire was seen throughout the Denver metropolitan area and was seen as far east as McCook, Nebraska and as far south as Colorado Springs. An air quality alert was put into effect on the evening of October 18. Over the six day period of growth between October 13 and 18, the fire gained 68,000 acres to the east and southeast and was now encroaching on the north end of Estes Park and was only eight miles west of Horsetooth Reservoir in Fort Collins and four miles northwest of the Loveland city limits. By October 19, the Larimer County Sheriffs Office had confirmed that at least 100 structures had burned within the fire limits.

Due to the proximity to the East Troublesome Fire during firefighting efforts, and the spot of another fire near Estes Park, the Cameron Peak Fire Incident Management Team took control of the fire, dubbed the "Thompson Zone." The "Thompson Zone" portion of the East Troublesome fire eventually led to the evacuation of the entire town of Estes Park on October 22. Many residents of Estes Park posted pictures to social media showing pitch black skies due to the intense smoke from the fire, also showing the long lines of vehicles trying to flee town. The Cameron Peak Fire Incident Management Team held control of the "Thompson Zone" portion of the East Troublesome fire until officials could get the fire under control and re-assume control.

Cooler temperatures and snowstorms helped firefighters regain control of the blaze over the final week of October, allowing for helicopters and air tankers to do water and slurry drops in affected areas. By the end of the month, the fire had burned 208,663 acres (326 sq mi.) and had forced the evacuation of over 16,000 people in various mountain communities, including the evacuation of the entire town of Estes Park, Grand Lake and portions of Granby. Firefighters were aided by snowstorms and cool temperatures for the remainder of the month and containment had increased to 64%. Fire officials assessed containment lines on the east perimeter of the fire near Masonville and Horsetooth Mountain for the following weeks.

=== Containment ===
By early November, firefighters had gained control of areas on the eastern and southeastern end of the fire, as containment lines were holding for several days while firefighters continued to spot check for any small brush fires that popped up during the containment process. On November 2, Larimer County officials lifted all mandatory and voluntary evacuation orders related to the fire, allowing residents within the fire to return home for the first time in over 50 days. Containment was increased to 85% on the same day. By the following day, fire crews were concentrating on repairing dozer lines and continuing containment for the fire on all edges.

The Cameron Peak fire was declared 100% contained on December 2, 112 days after igniting. Firefighters decided to let the last remaining portion of the fire, contained to a small pond where it was still smoldering underneath the soil, burn out northwest of the Colorado State University Mountain Campus.

== Aftermath ==
=== Damage ===
The Cameron Peak fire torched 208,663 acres (84,443 ha) in Arapaho and Roosevelt National Forests and Rocky Mountain National Park in both Larimer and Jackson Counties and cost nearly $134 million to fight. The wildfire was the largest to ever burn in Colorado's history, and became the first wildfire to surpass 200,000 acres. The wildfire burned concurrently with the East Troublesome Fire near Kremmling, Colorado, torching a combined 400,000 acres. At its peak, the fire had over 1,000 personnel fighting it, with multiple helicopters and air tankers providing water and slurry drops. The fire closed 2 million acres of land in Rocky Mountain National Park, Arapaho and Roosevelt National Forests.

The fire led to over 20,000 people being evacuated throughout mountain communities west of Fort Collins and Loveland. On November 6, the Larimer County Damage Assessment Teams (DAT) completed their report of all known structure damage due to the fire, and found that a total of 469 structures had been destroyed by the fire, including 224 residential structures and 220 outbuildings. There were 17 business structures from the Shambhala Mountain Center that were impacted by the fire, and 42 of the residential structures impacted by the fire were primary residences, mostly in the Redstone Canyon area. Most of the worst damage from the fire occurred on three separate occasions and impacted various communities. Damage from the Labor Day weekend expansion occurred in Poudre Canyon south of Highway 14 near Archer's Poudre River Resort and the Monument Gulch area. Damage from the weekend expansion of September 26 and 28 occurred in or near Poudre Canyon between the Fish Hatchery and Rustic, the Manhattan Road area, and the Boy Scout Ranch Road area and damage from the October 14 expansion occurred in or near Upper and Lower Buckhorn areas, Crystal Mountain, Bobcat Ridge, Buckskin Heights, Redstone Canyon, Storm Mountain, The Retreat, and Pingree Park. Over the duration of the fire, it was controlled by 10 different incident command teams, including six Type 2, three Type 1 and one Type 3 team.

The fire's rapid spread was contributed by extreme temperatures, low humidity and heavy winds over the 112 days it was fought. Wind gusts over the fire topped out at 80 miles per hour, in September and October, on multiple occasions moving the fire in all directions. One of the biggest contributing factors to the fire's large spread was the large amount of beetle kill trees and many drought-stricken trees within the burn area. Many ponderosa pines, Engelmann spruce, and mixed conifers added fuel to the fire's growth through the mountains. The contribution of beetle kill, drought and harsh terrain made it difficult for firefighters to safely attack the fire. Heavy winds made it hard to get aircraft into the fire zone to attack the fire, being grounded on numerous occasions due to red flag conditions across Colorado. Firefighters worked on protecting homes threatened by the fire with heavy equipment and built fire lines.

=== Investigation ===
The U.S. Forest Service is still investigating the exact cause of the fire, but believes it was human caused. The fire started on August 13 in an area between the Chambers Lake campground and Cameron Peak, but many clues to the cause of the fire remain unknown. A Loveland resident in the area the day the fire started claimed to have heard a gunshot and then seen smoke rising from the area where the fire started, and another resident noticed smoke while hiking in the area around the fire.

== Impact ==
=== Economic ===
There were severe economic impacts due to the various wildfires that affected the state of Colorado. The Cameron Peak fire cost over $132 million to fight and contain, with market property loss estimated at $6.3 million, and total structure loss estimated near $100 million. The fire exacerbated already exhausted business dealing with the COVID-19 pandemic, setting back business owners in mountain towns by thousands, some over tens of thousands. A survey sent out to 700 businesses by the Estes Park Economic Development Group yielded 88 replies, stating that 83% of business owners suffered some sort of economic impact due to the fires.

Colorado Congressman Joe Neguse pushed for wildfire relief in a COVID-19 stimulus package. A letter written to Democratic and Republican lawmakers in the House of Representatives and Senate calls for cash for cities to keep firefighters on payroll, payment of resources, investments of risk-mitigation systems, federal support for late-season hotshot crews and other federal-level fire response efforts, local-level recovery efforts to revitalize the health of the environment, water quality and community economies after wildfires.

On March 11, President Joe Biden signed the American Rescue Plan Act of 2021, which will send aid to Americans struggling from the COVID-19 pandemic. The bill will provide funding for keeping first responders on payroll, especially in communities that were stretched thin the last 12 months. The state of Colorado will receive $6 billion with Larimer County receiving $69 million. Within the county, the city of Fort Collins is expected to receive $27.5 million in funding, followed by Loveland at $9.5 million, Berthoud at $1.9 million and Estes Park at $1.3 million.

On March 21, Colorado governor Jared Polis signed two bills aimed at helping provide wildfire response and management for the future. The first bill will provide $30.8 million to support the purchase of a Firehawk helicopter for wildfire mitigation and the leasing of a type 1 helicopter or other available and appropriate aviation source that is configured for wildfire mitigation. The bill will also allow for the Division of Fire Prevention and Control to use money from the Wildfire Emergency Preparedness Fund to provide wildfire suppression assistance to local agencies across Colorado. The other bill will provide $13 million in forest restoration, wildfire risk mitigation, wildfire preparedness and post-fire recovery and mitigation efforts.

=== Closures & Evacuations ===
The Cameron Peak fire forced the closure of two major east–west highways within the state, along with many other county and local roads. U.S. Route 34 and Highway 14 were both closed for extended periods of time during the fires, with the latter not reopening until late October due to heavy firefighting traffic and equipment.

Approximately 20,000 people were evacuated from their homes due to both fires, including the entire town of Estes Park, parts of Granby, Grand Lake, Lady Moon, Red Feather Highlands, Red Feather Lakes, Crystal Lakes, County Road 27 to Big Bear Road, Rist Canyon Road, Highway 14 from Gateway to Stove Prairie Park, Crystal Mountain, Bobcat Ridge, Buckskin Heights, Redstone Canyon, Storm Mountain, The Retreat, Pingree Park and many other locations across Larimer and Jackson Counties. Hundreds of campsites within Arapaho and Roosevelt National Forests and Rocky Mountain National Park were also evacuated and closed.

=== Infrastructure ===
Poudre Valley Rural Electrical Association and XCEL Energy cut off power to many affected areas during the fire, in order to keep the fire from destroying running power lines, electrical boxes, etc.

=== Environmental ===
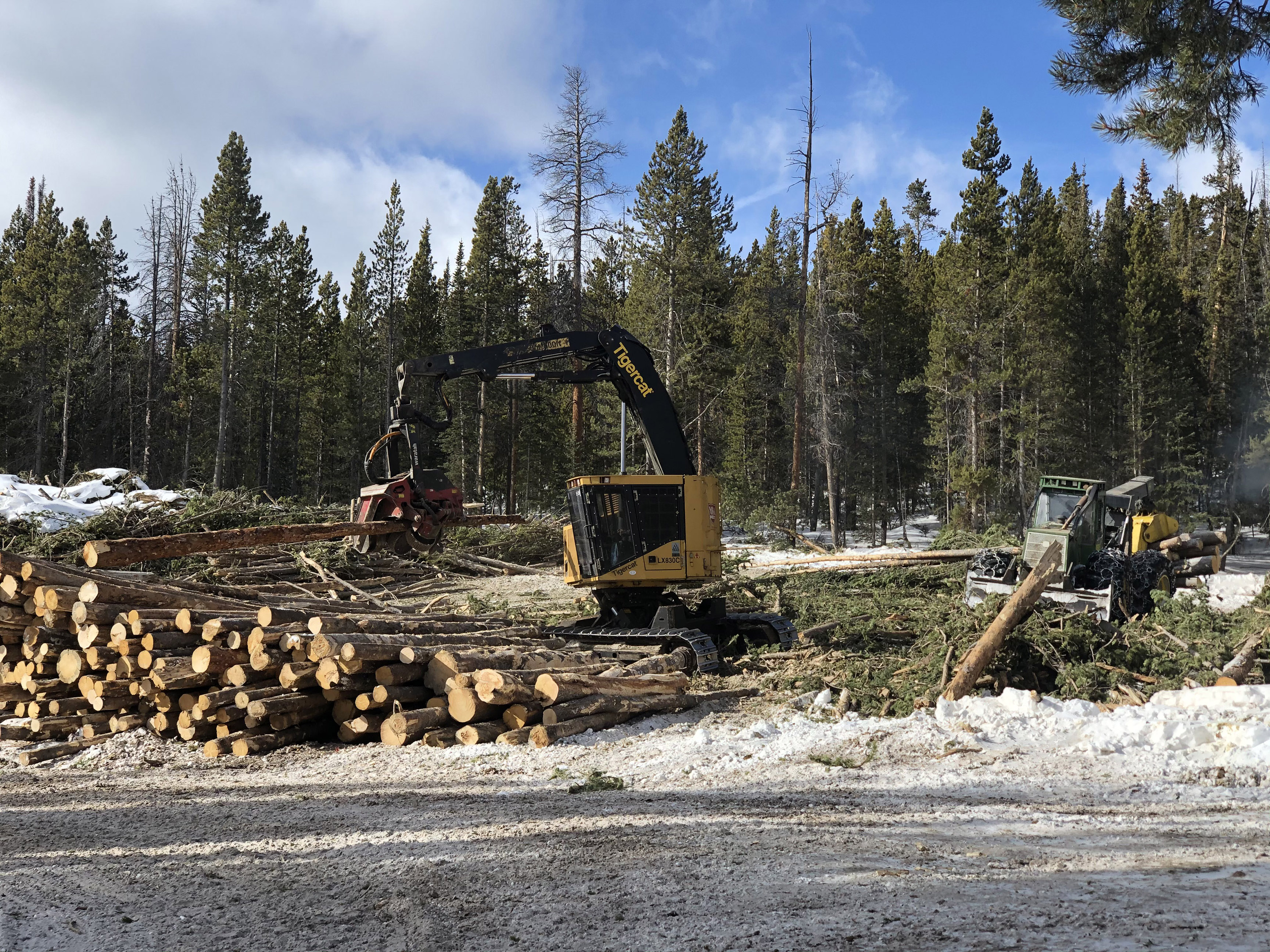
Trees being decked after removal as a fire suppression tactic after the Cameron Peak Fire in January 2021.

The fire is thought to have a major impact on the wildlife, habitat loss, tree population, and many more elements over the next several years. The burn scar from the fire is expected to last and will take years to recover properly. Many areas within the burn scar burned intensely and will take many years for the native Ponderosa Pines to regrow. A proposed 387 acre tree thinning operation would clear Colorado's forests of trees that are fuel to burn during wildfires because of beetle kill and environmental factors. Colorado has around 2.5 million trees dead from insects, diseases and lack of management. Officials also project that winter weather will deposit ash and other debris from the fire into the rivers that feed into watersheds across the Colorado Rockies. The potential for runoff from the fires polluting rivers poses a risk for aquatic life living within Colorado's rivers. Native plant life is also currently listed at risk due to more invasive plants growing along the burn areas.

The United States Forest Service (USFS) released its Burned Area Emergency Response (BAER) report on January 5, citing that the potential impacts on life and safety are considered "major." In the report, it was found that 36% within the 326 square miles of land the fire burned had suffered high soil burn severity, which poses a high risk of erosion or flooding due to the soil not being able to absorb moisture. 44% of the burn area suffered low burn severity and 20% was left unburned. The Forest Service predicts that while some areas will recover over the next several years, it could be a decade or longer before many of the higher burn areas recover fully.

== See also ==
- List of Colorado wildfires
- 2020 Colorado wildfires
  - Grizzly Creek Fire, a concurrent wildfire near Glenwood Springs, Colorado
  - Pine Gulch Fire, a concurrent wildfire near Grand Junction, Colorado
- 2020 California wildfires
- 2020 Western United States wildfire season
- Hayman Fire, was the largest fire in state history until 2020
- Spring Creek Fire (2018)
