= Pine Gulch Fire =

2020 wildfire in Colorado, United States

- Part of the 2020 Colorado wildfires
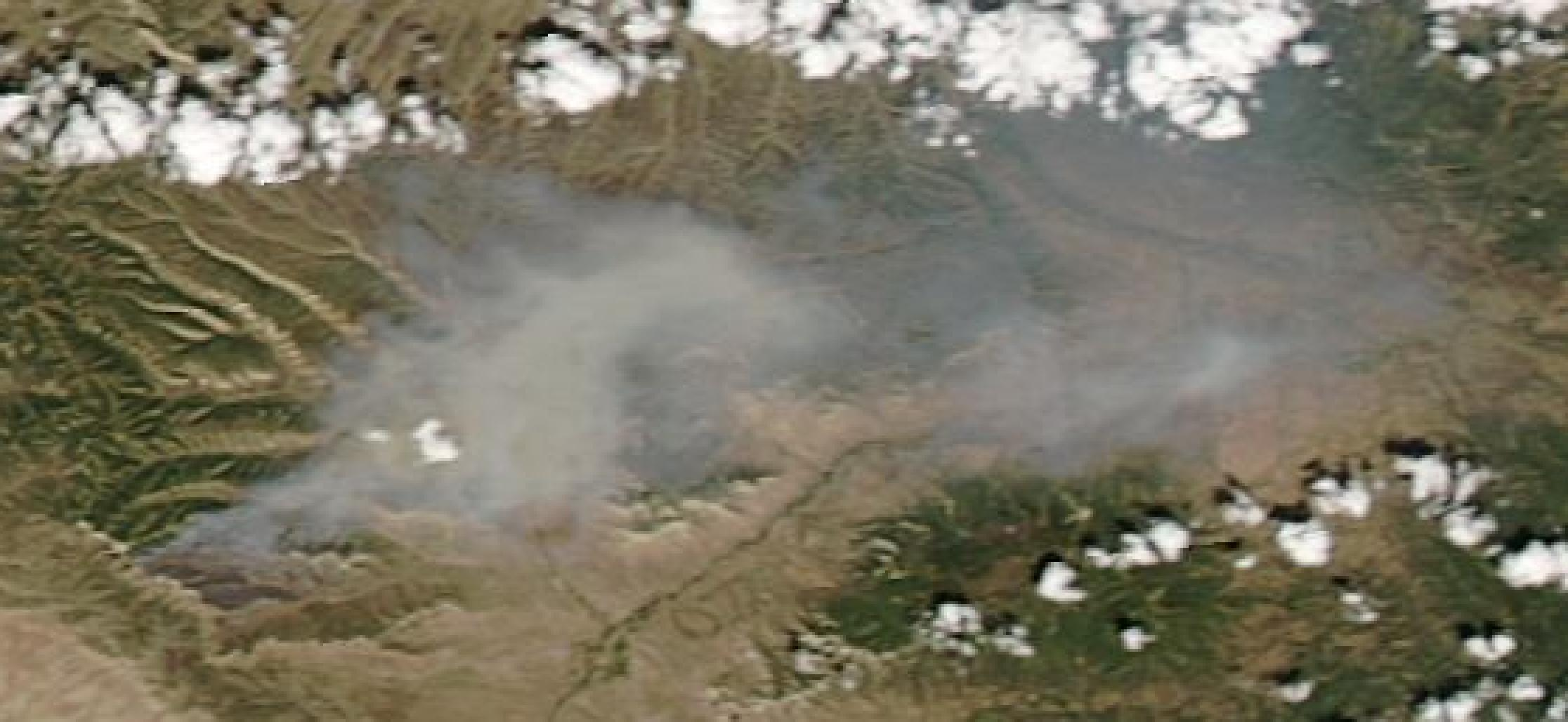
- The Pine Gulch Fire as seen from space on August 10, 2020
- Date: July 31, 2020–September 23, 2020
- Location: Mesa County & Garfield County, Colorado, United States
- Coordinates: 39.336°N 108.526°W

Statistics
- Burned area: 139,007 acres (56,254 ha)
- Land use: Recreational

Impacts
- Injuries: 3 firefighters
- Structures destroyed: 1 outbuilding

Ignition
- Cause: Lightning strike

Map
- Location of Pine Gulch Fire in Colorado

The Pine Gulch Fire was a wildfire that burned in Mesa County and Garfield County, Colorado in the United States. The fire was started by a lightning strike and first reported on July 31, 2020, and quickly grew, resulting in the fire being named the largest wildfire in Colorado history, surpassing the 2002 Hayman Fire. Almost seven weeks later, it was surpassed by the Cameron Peak Fire in Larimer County.

The Pine Gulch Fire burned on private and public lands and threatened gas and oil drilling infrastructure. The fire resulted in the closure of highways, government-managed and recreational land, and the evacuation of rural residences in the fire zone. The fire was declared 100% contained on September 23, and all evacuation orders were lifted. In total, the fire burned 139,007 acres (56,254 ha).

== Events ==
=== July ===
The Pine Gulch Fire was first reported on July 31, 2020, around 5:15 PM, in a remote area of Bureau of Land Management (BLM) land in Mesa County, Colorado, approximately eighteen miles north of Grand Junction. Started by a lightning strike, the fire spread rapidly, fueled by hot weather, steep terrain, and drought-stricken grass, sage, pinyon and fir.

=== August ===
Burning entirely on BLM land, within 24 hours the Pine Gulch Fire had grown to 280 acres (113 ha). Fire crews were only able to reach the fire area by foot, to build control lines, with the support of helicopters and planes dumping water and retardant. The next day, on August 2, the fire had grown spread north, burning on private land along a road. The fire was five percent contained, at 1,500 acres (607 ha) by the morning of August 3. Mesa County Rd. X 1/2 after High Lonesome Ranch were closed.

The fire continued to grow, threatening oil and gas drilling infrastructure. A temporary flight restriction was put in place for the fire area on August 4. The fire began burning northwards onto Horse Mountain. Air quality began to decline and an Air Quality Health Advisory was put in place for northern Mesa County and southwestern Garfield County. Within 36 hours the fire had grown to 11,846 acres (4,794 ha) by the evening of August 5. Red Flag Warnings were put in place on the 6th and additional road closures were put in place. Smoke began to impact De Beque, Colorado and areas along Interstate 70.

Extremely low humidity, high temperatures and strong winds enabled the fire to grow to over 20,000 acres (8,094 ha) by the evening of August 7. The fire had moved down Forshay Gulch on the north side of Horse Mountain, before eventually spreading to Lion and Bledsaw Gulches and along 200 Rd. The fires continued growth resulted in evacuation warnings being put in place for residents in rural, western Garfield County and a small group of homes were evacuated along County Roads 200 and 202. On August 9, evacuations were put in place for more residences in the area.

A red flag warning was put into place on August 11 and the fire was seven percent contained. The fire began burning in closer to Roan Creek and on the south slope of Kimball Mountain. Red flag winds pushed the fire over 50,000 acres (20,234 ha) on August 11. On August 15, the fire burned onto Garfield Mesa and additional road closures were put in place. The air quality was impacted in Craig and Meeker.

The fire moved north of Fruita, resulting in more road closures. Air tankers began providing support, dumping retardant to slow the fire's spread. On August 18, residents on a portion of Roan Creek Rd were allowed to return to their homes. An evacuation warning was put in place for areas of County Road 205, Kimball Mountain Rd and County Road 256. A thunderstorm moved through the western flank and caused wind gusts up to 40 MPH in near Echo Lake, resulting in firefighters having to evacuate the area due to the fire's erratic behavior and fast spread. This caused the fire to grow to an estimated 125,000 acres (50,586 ha). This growth resulted in additional evacuation orders in Garfield County for residents east of Highway 139 and closures of 639,111 acres (258,639 ha) of BLM land north of Loma, Fruita, Grand Junction and Palisade.

By August 24, the Pine Gulch Fire was 44 percent contained. Two days later, on August 26, Highway 139 reopened. The next day, suppression repair began. A flash flood warning was announced for the eastern portion of the fire due to forecasted thunderstorms. A small debris flow took place near Kimball Creek Rd. On August 28, the fire had burned 139,006 acres (56,254 ha) and was named the largest wildfire in Colorado history. The fire was 77 percent contained. Evacuation warnings were lifted for all areas west of Highway 139 to the Utah border and BLM closures were reduced.

=== September ===
On September 1, all evacuation orders were lifted. As of September 3, the fire had burned 139,007 acres (56,254 ha) and was 83 percent contained. By September 9, the fire was 95 percent contained.

== Impact ==
The Pine Gulch Fire resulted in the evacuation of residences, including along Roan Creek (CR 204) Rd. Numerous county roads were closed, as well as a portion of Highway 139.

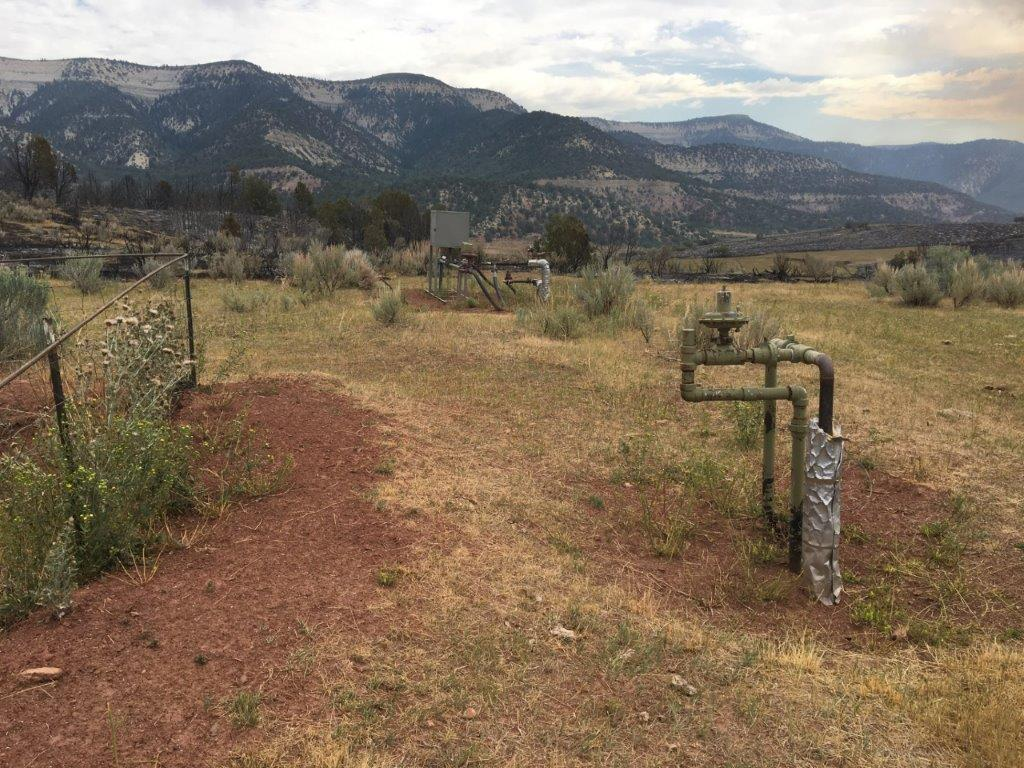
A natural gas well threatened by the Pine Gulch Fire. The well was stopped from producing gas when the fire started.

The Pine Gulch Fire impacted recreation, transportation, and energy infrastructure in the area. The fire resulted in the closure of roads. The fire threatened oil drills and gas wells. This resulted in gas wells being stopped from collecting gas on August 2 and fire crews implementing defensible space around them.

The fire impacted air quality in Garfield, Moffat, Mesa and Rio Blanco Counties, including the communities of Craig and Meeker.

Firefighters sustained minor injuries.

== Gallery ==
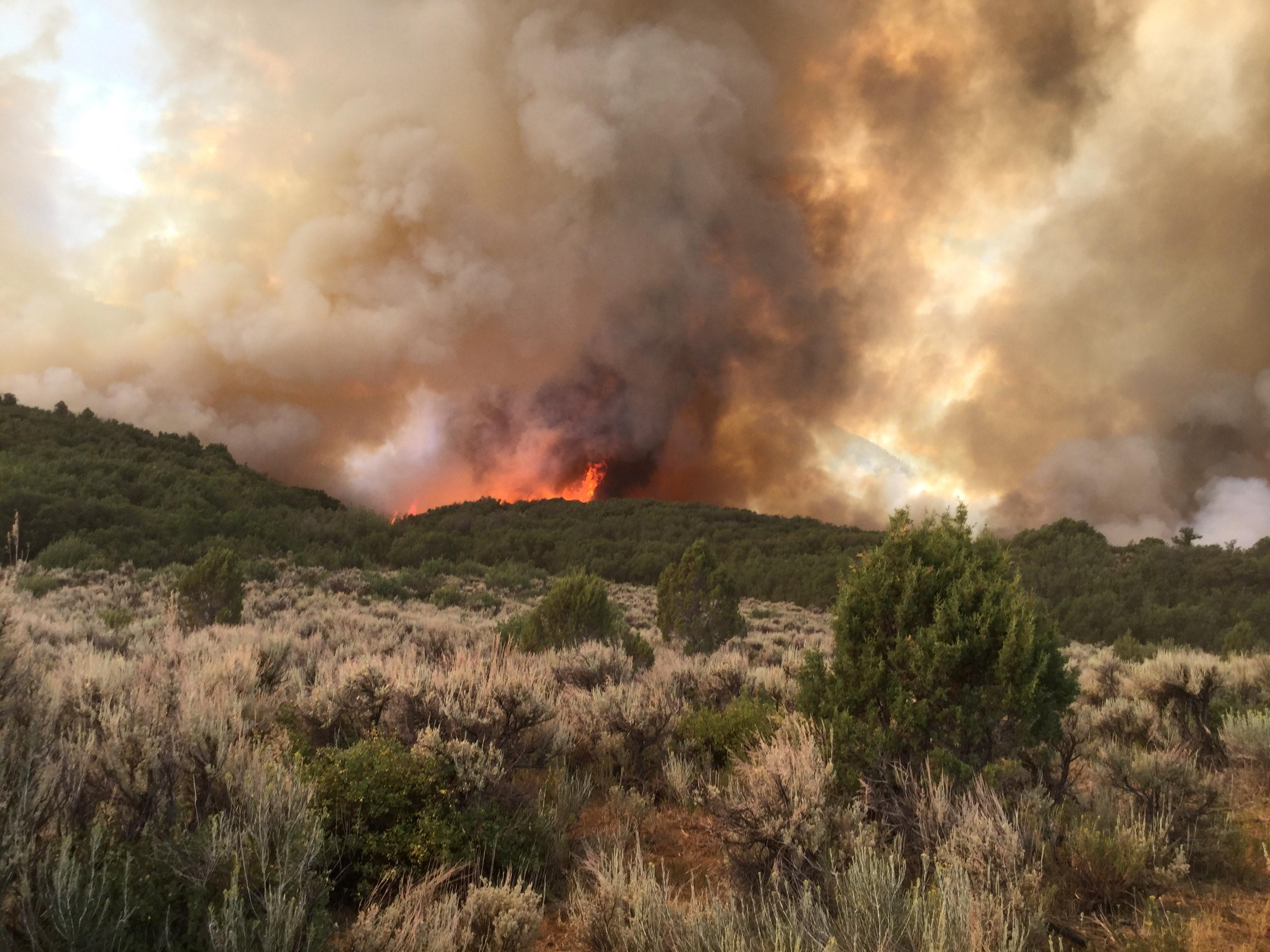
The Pine Gulch Fire on the evening of August 2

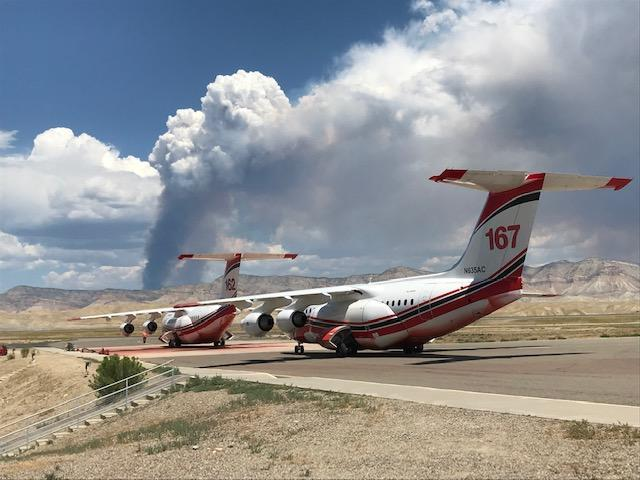
The fire seen from Grand Junction Regional Airport with airplanes used for aerial firefighting in foreground on August 3.

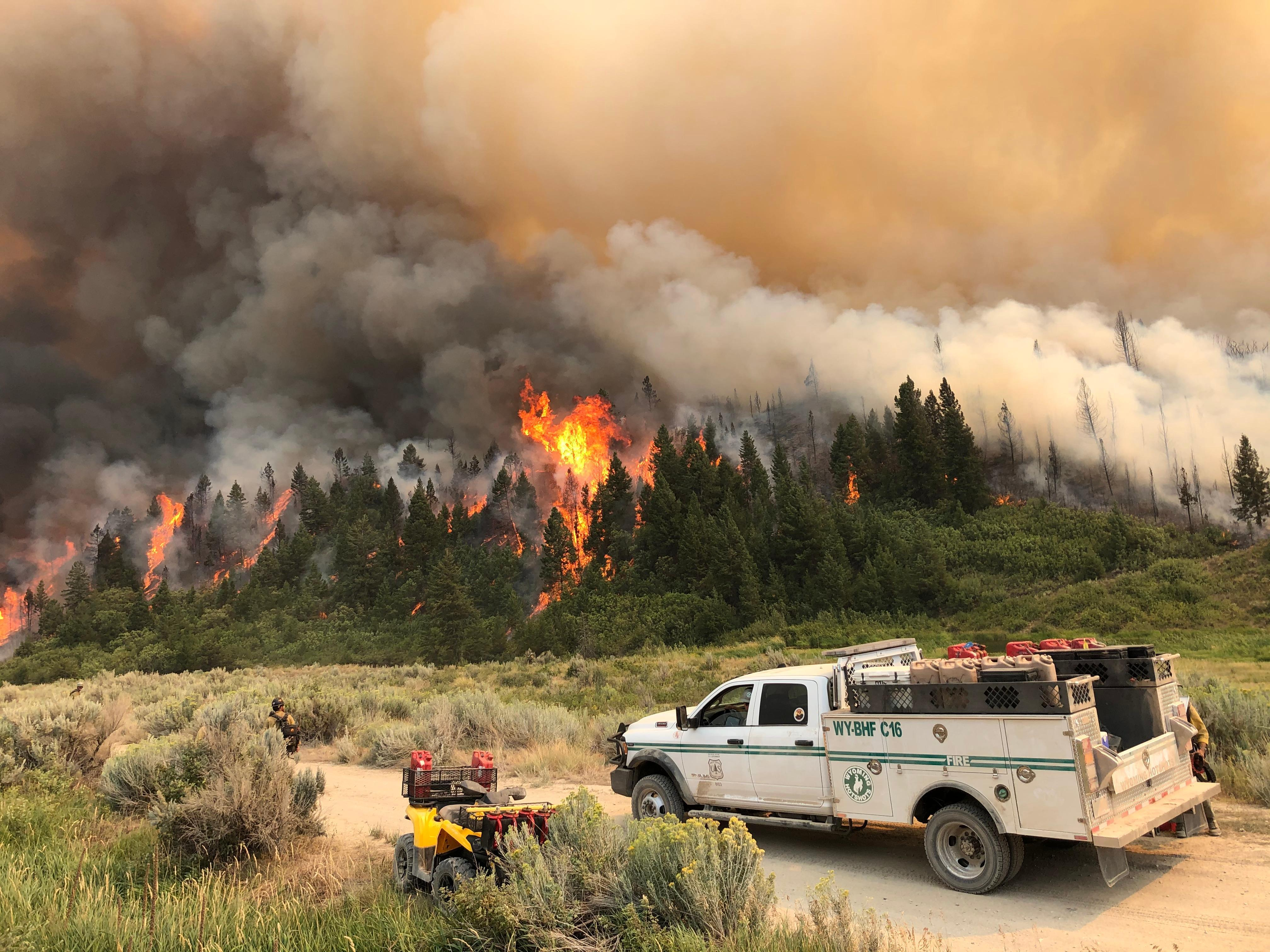
Fire activity on August 6.

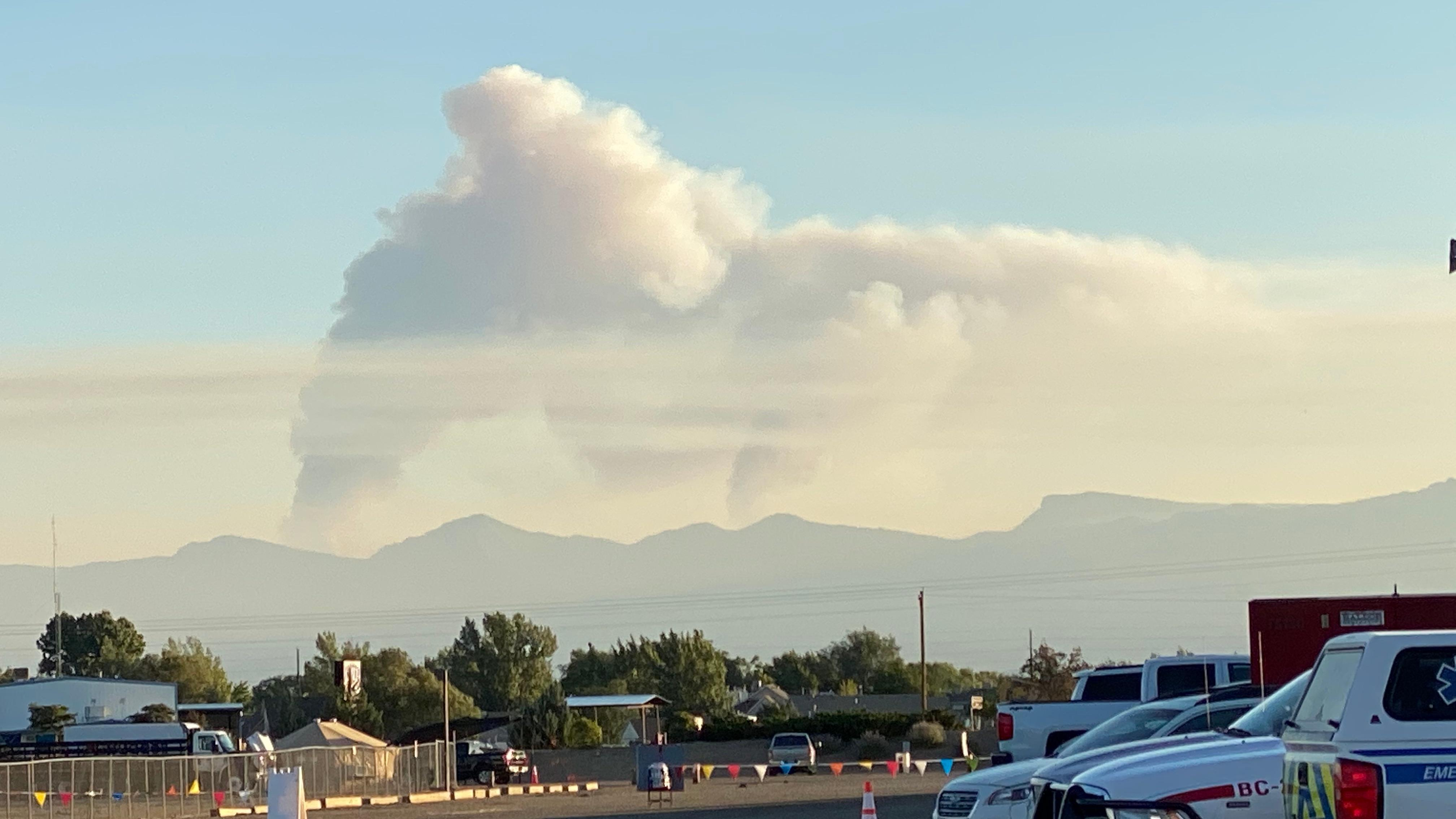
Fire activity from incident command on August 9.

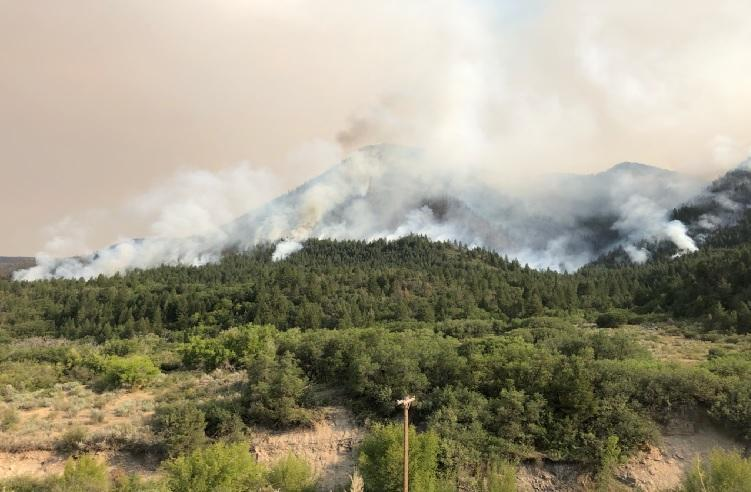
Fire growth on the southwest side of the Pine Gulch Fire on August 15.

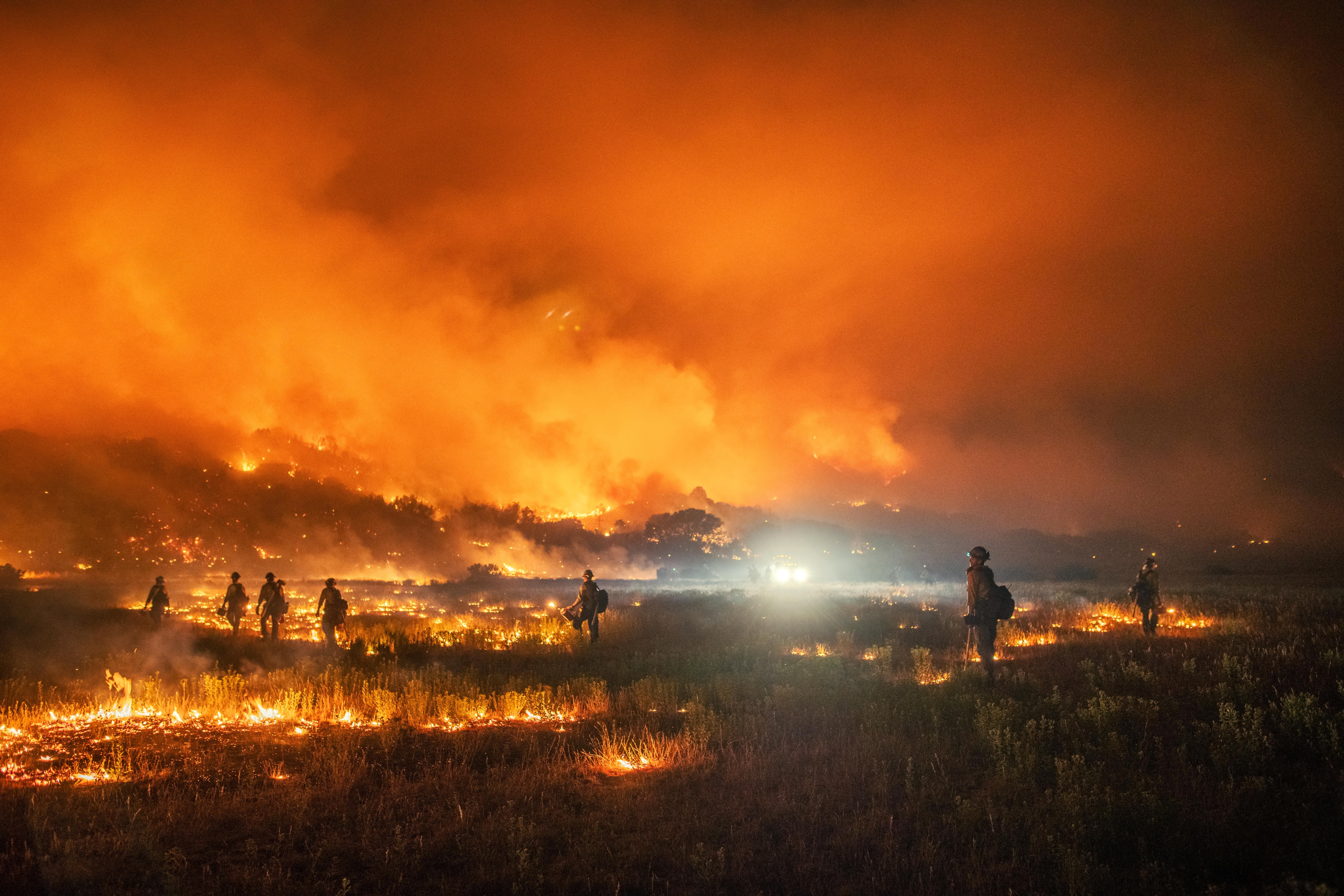
Firefighters during night operations on August 16.

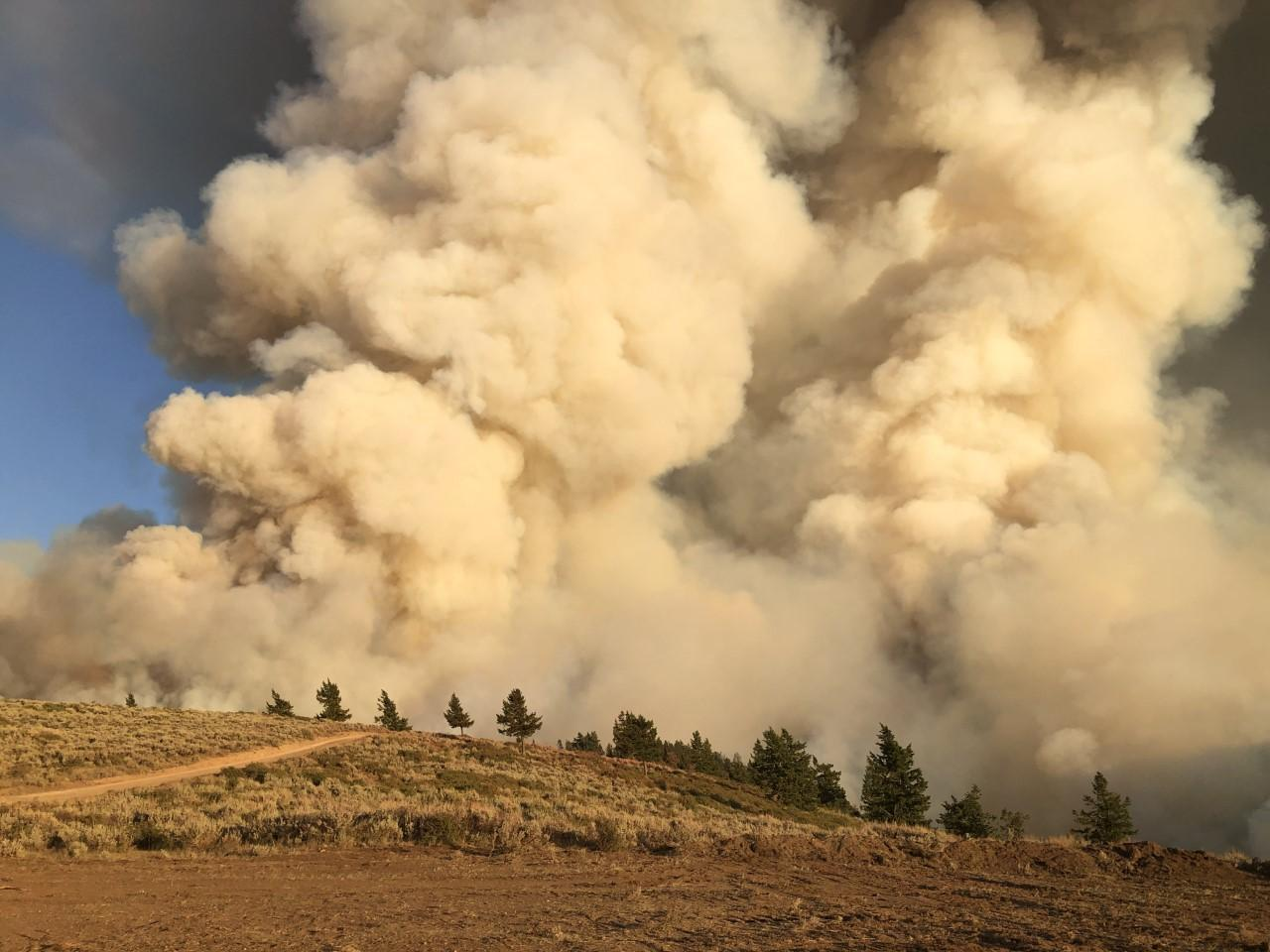
Activity on the northwest flank on August 19.

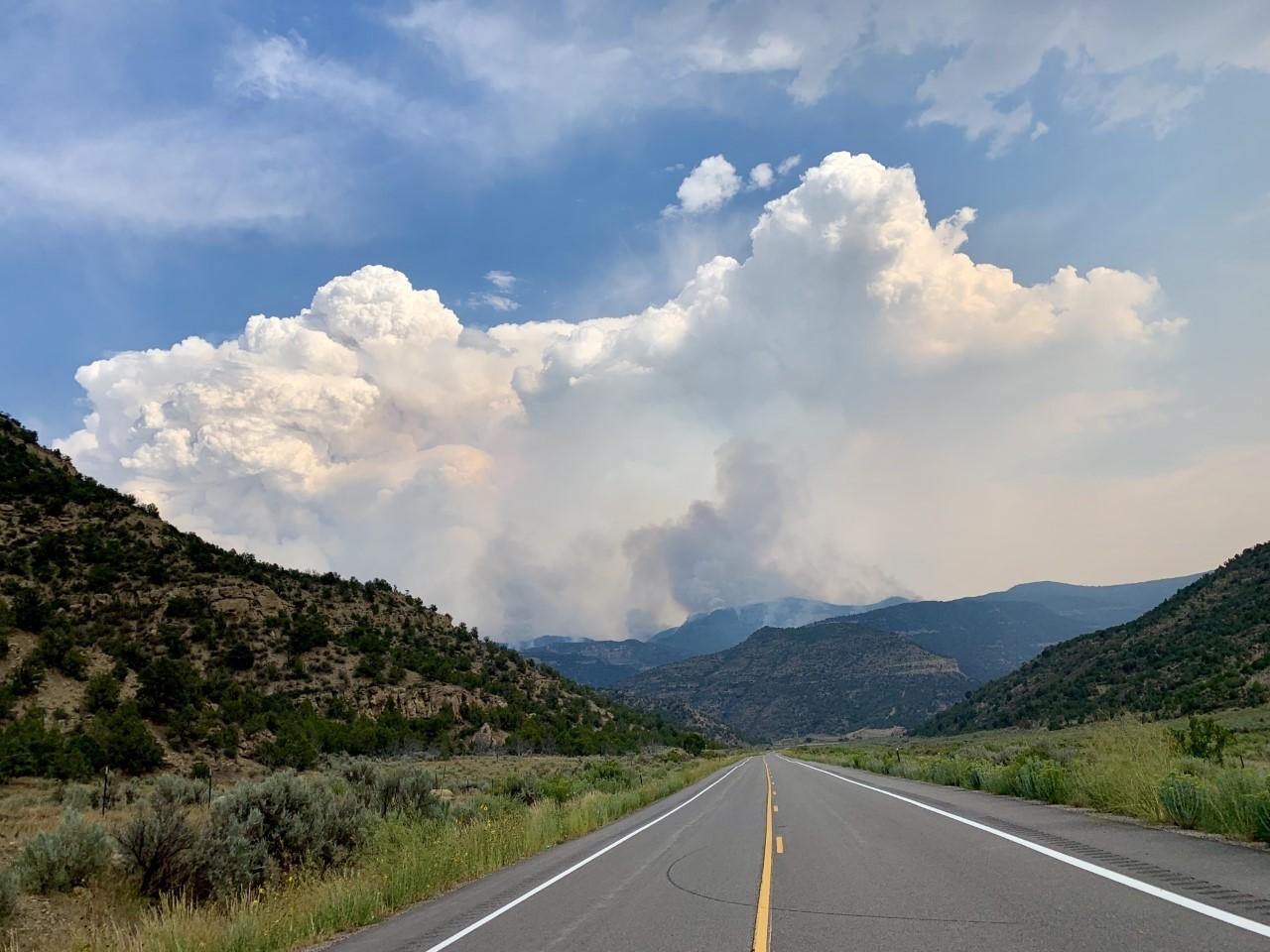
The fire seen from Douglas Pass on August 20.

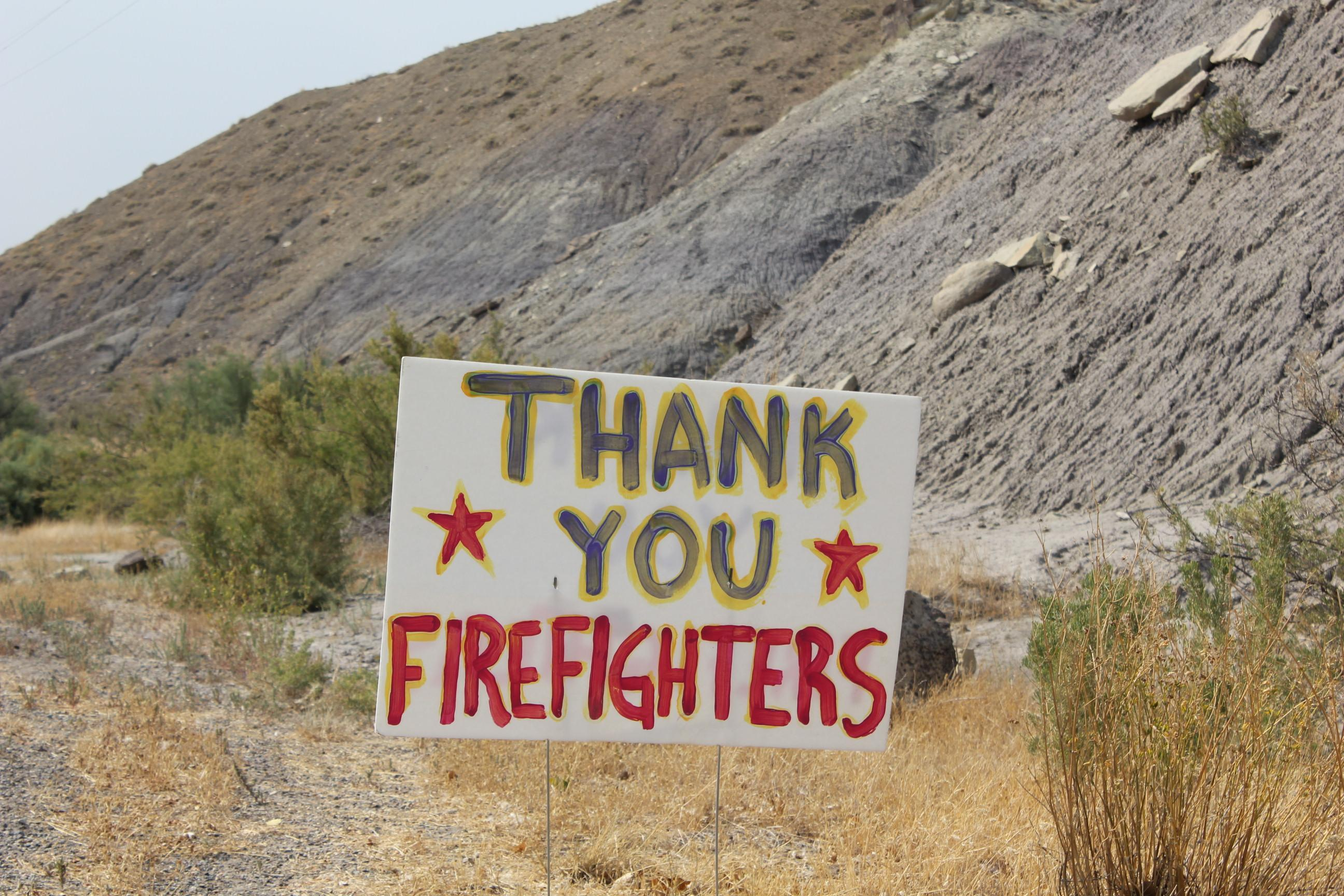
A sign thanking firefighters.

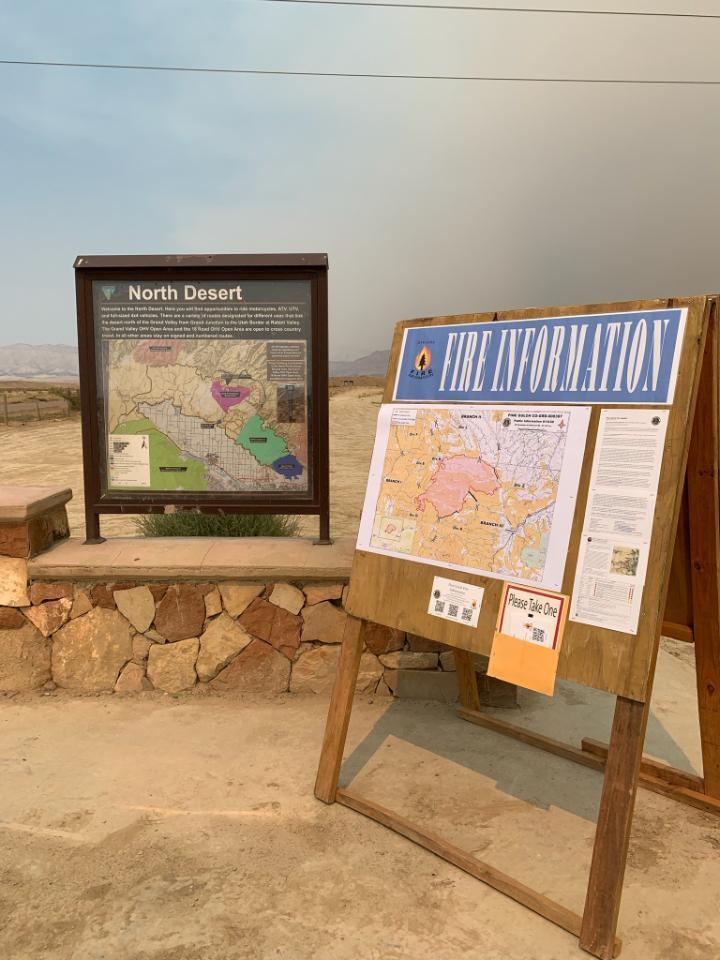
Information signs for the fire.

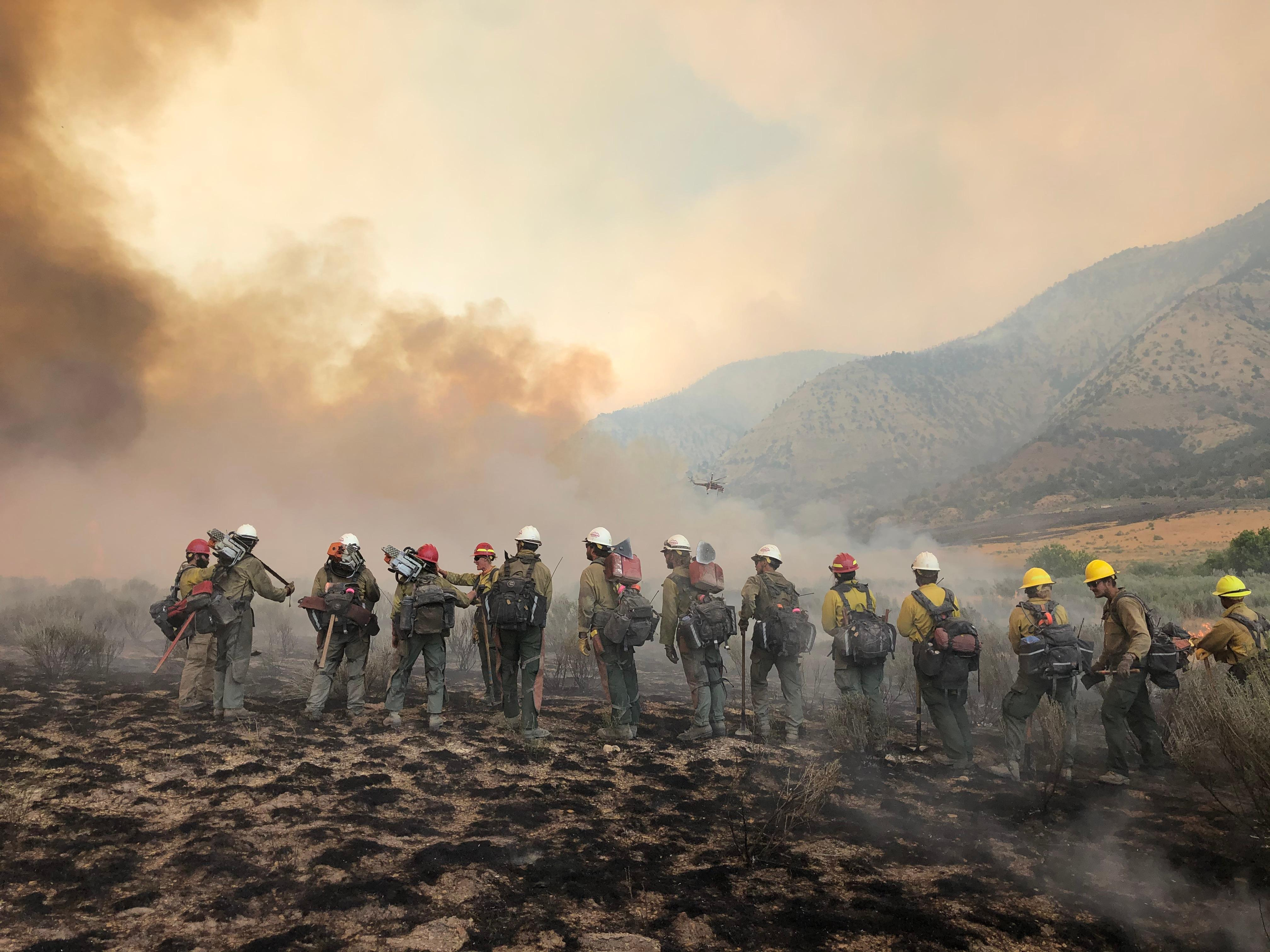
Firefighters on August 21.

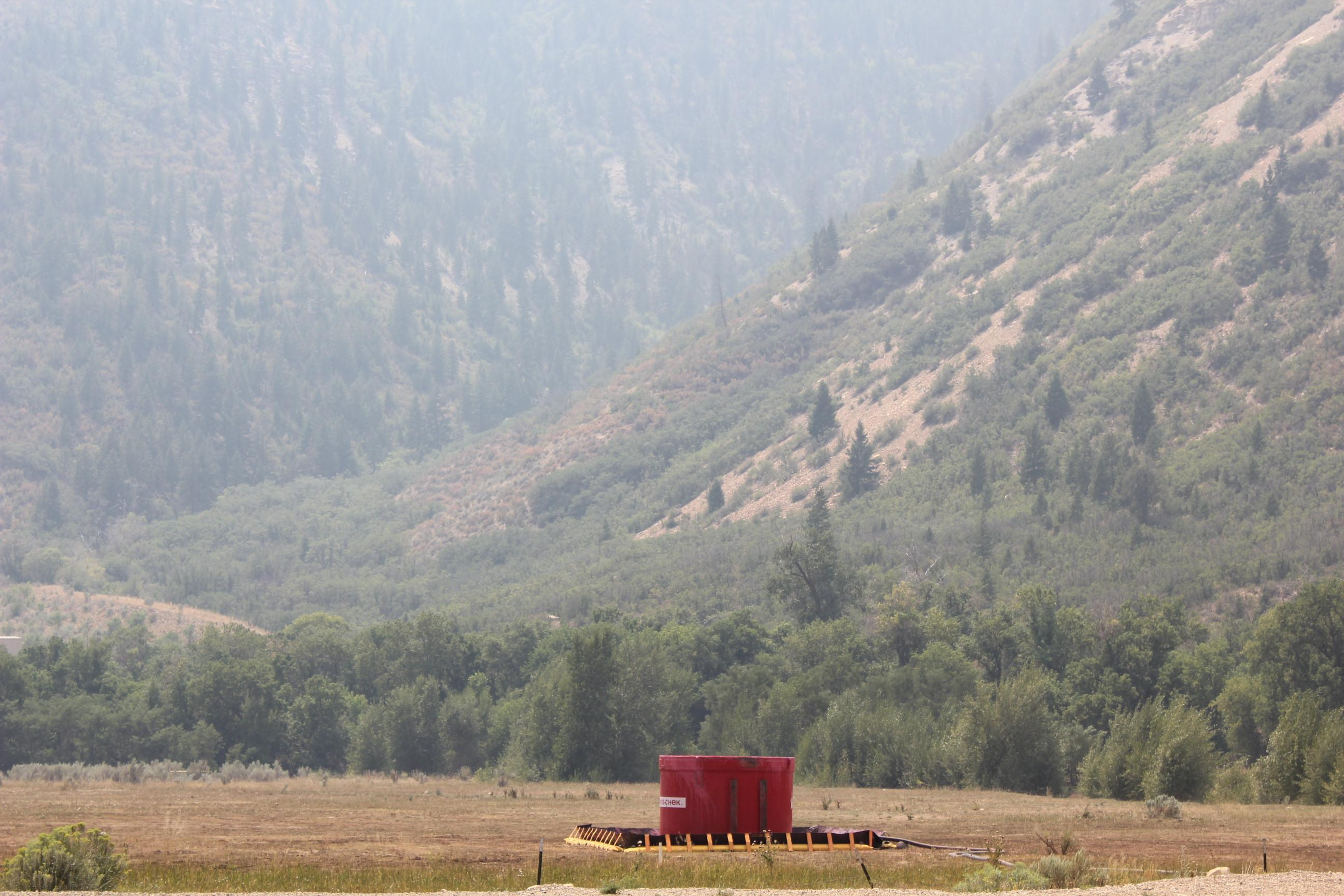
Fire retardant for helicopters.

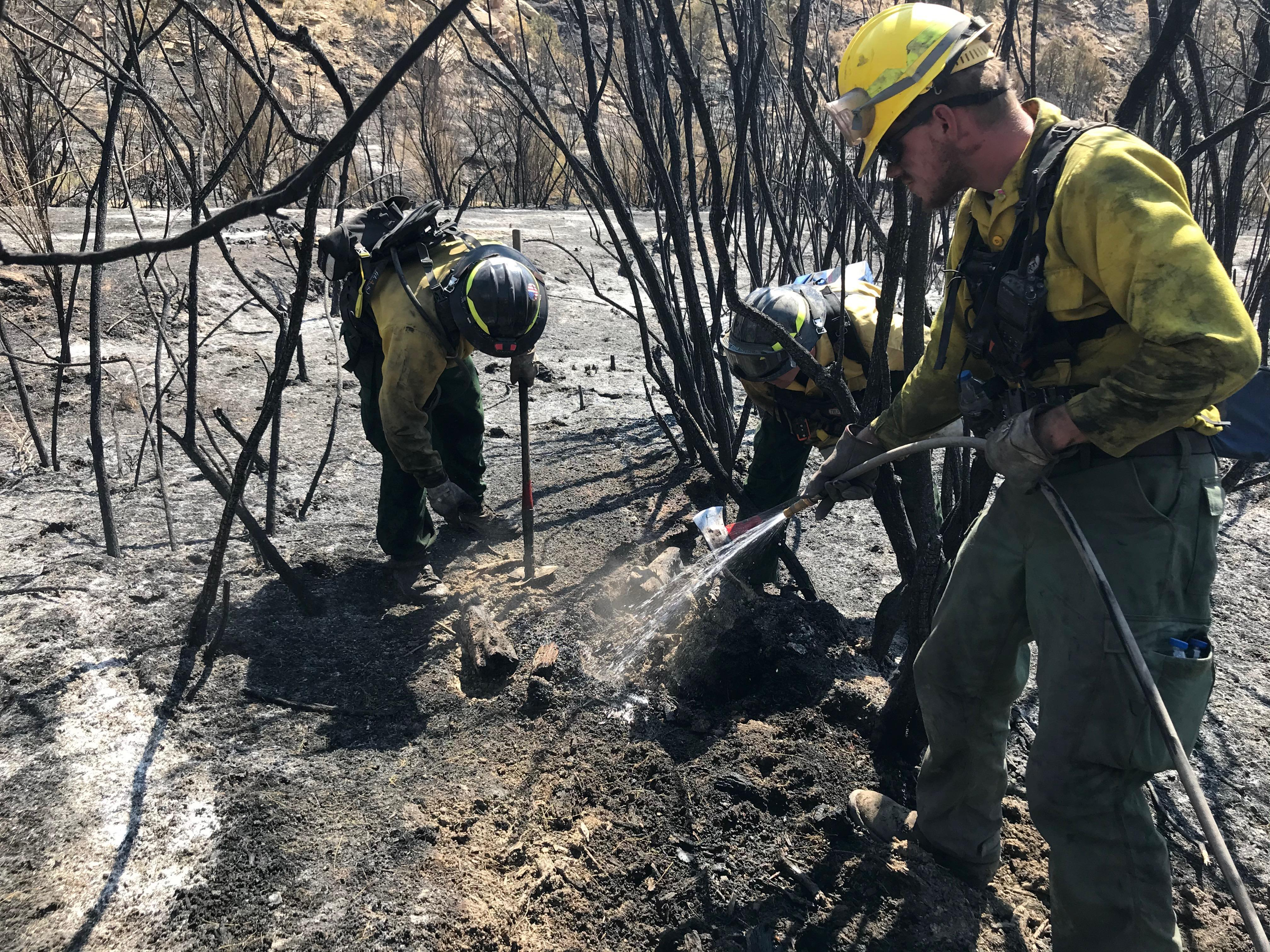
Firefighters mopping up a hot spot on August 26.

== See also ==
- Grizzly Creek Fire
- List of Colorado wildfires
- 2020 Colorado wildfires
- Cameron Peak Fire, largest in state history
- Hayman Fire, surpassed by Pine Gulch as largest in state history until the Cameron Peak Fire
