= Grizzly Creek Fire =

2020 wildfire in Colorado, United States

- Part of the 2020 Colorado wildfires
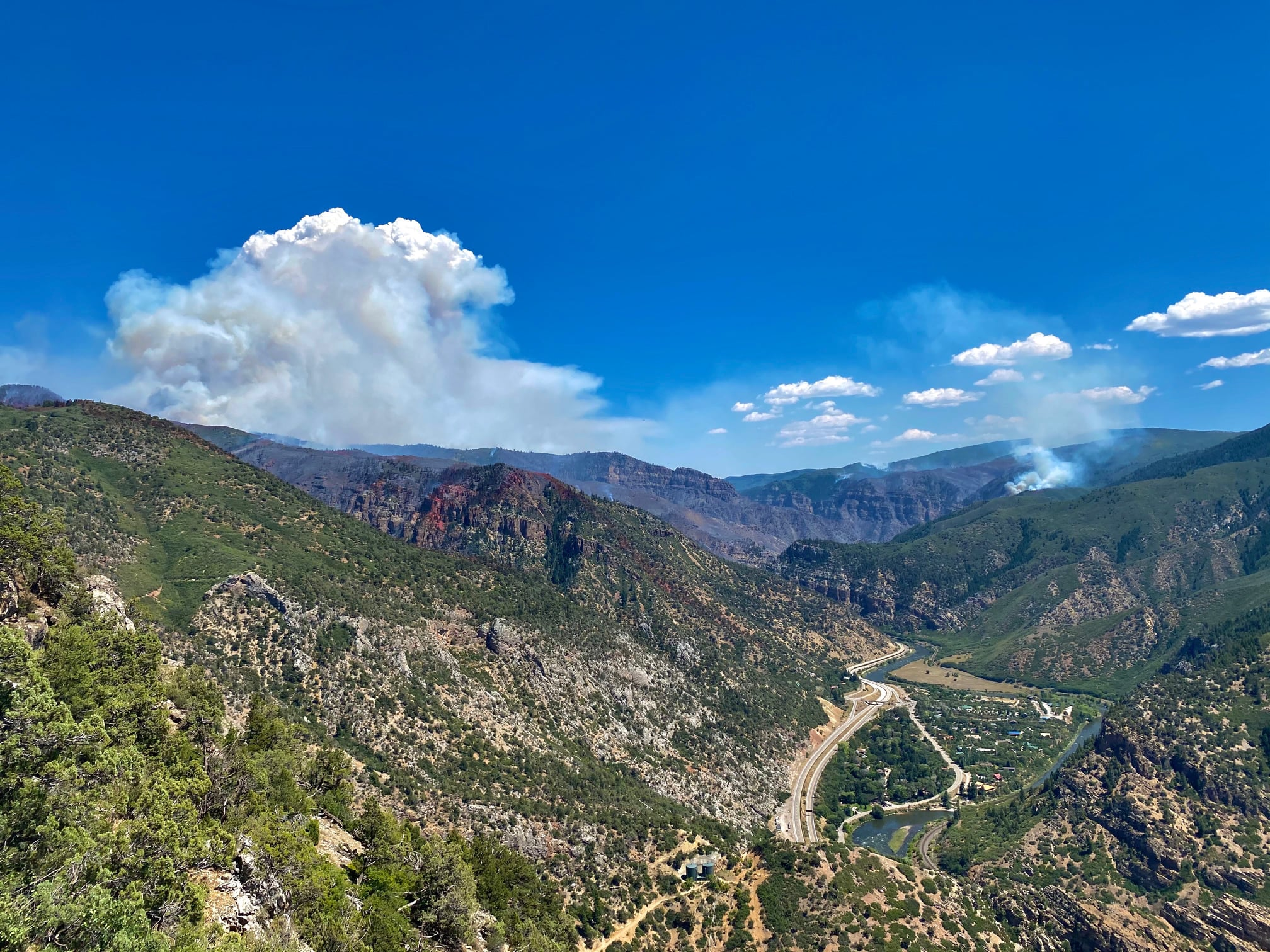
- Grizzly Creek Fire on August 23, 2020
- Date: August 10, 2020 – December 18, 2020
- Location: Glenwood Canyon, Glenwood Springs, Colorado, United States
- Coordinates: 39.572°N 107.266°W

Statistics
- Burned area: I-70 Glenwood 32,631 acres (13,205 ha)

Ignition
- Cause: Truck chains

Map
- Location in Colorado

The Grizzly Creek Fire (also called the 120 Fire) was a wildfire that burned 32,631 acres (13,205 ha) in Glenwood Canyon in the state of Colorado in the United States. The fire first ignited on August 10, 2020 and was declared 100% contained on December 18, 2020. The Grizzly Creek fire's proximity to Interstate 70 resulted in a 13-day closure of the interstate. It threatened the Shoshone Generating Station and resulted in the evacuation of residences in the area, as well as closure of recreational land in portions of White River National Forest. The fire was ruled to be human-caused.

== Events ==
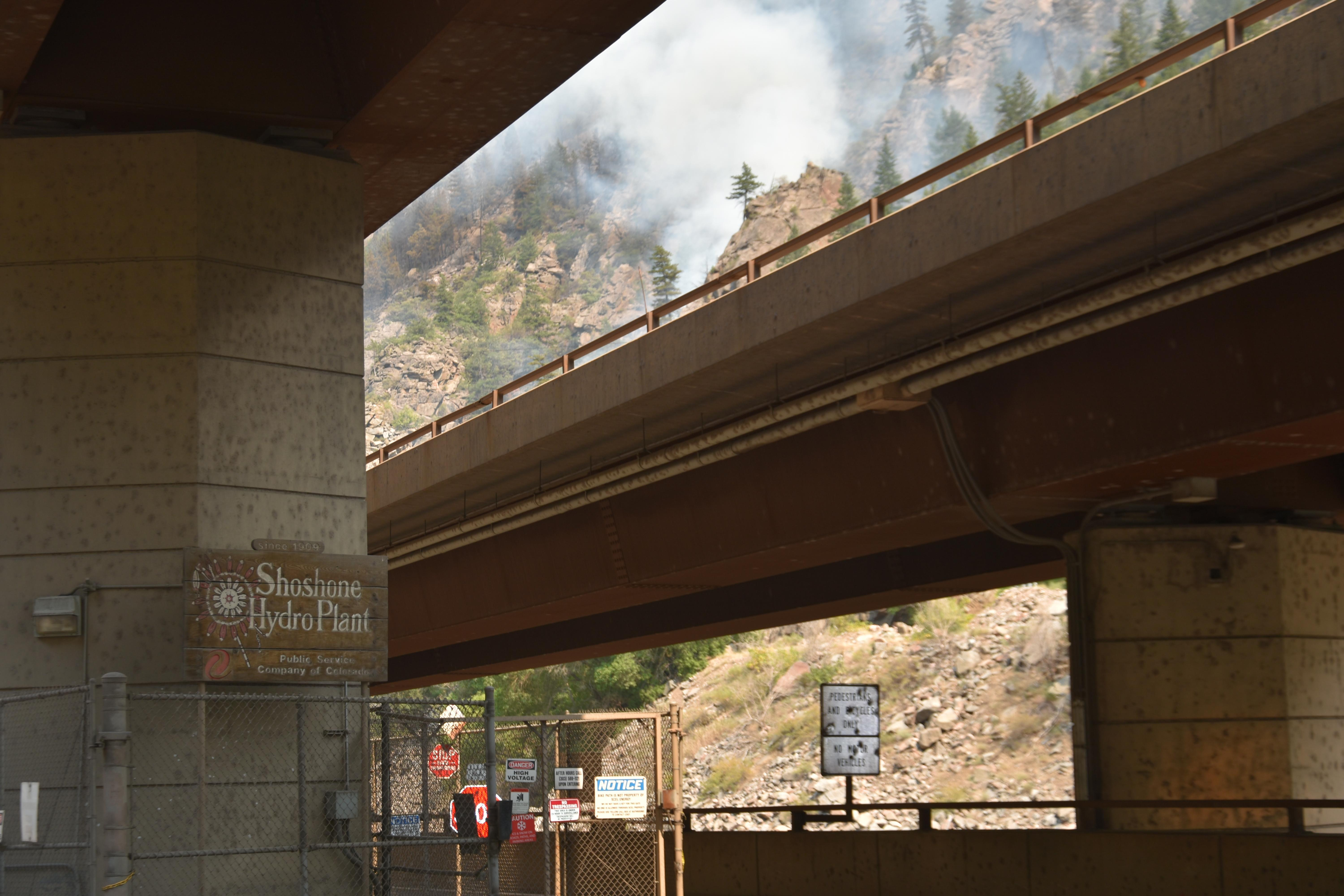
The Grizzly Creek Fire burning near the Shoshone Hydroelectric Generating Station

=== August ===
The Grizzly Creek Fire, which was first called the 120 Fire, was first reported around 1:30 PM on August 10, burning in Glenwood Canyon one mile east of Glenwood Springs, Colorado. Fueled by hot, dry, windy weather, the fire began spreading in multiple directions. Witnesses to the fire at its start included people rafting through the canyon and a Colorado Department of Transportation employee who tried to put it out with a fire extinguisher. Its growth towards Interstate 70 resulted in the interstate's closure from Glenwood Springs to Gypsum. By August 12, the fire had crossed both the interstate and the Colorado River. The power plant at the Shoshone Generating Station was evacuated, along with the communities of No Name, Lookout Mountain (Glenwood Springs), and Coulter Creek. The Glenwood Springs Community Center was named an evacuation point to connect evacuees with services and Battle Mountain High School was named an evacuation center. Local roads in the area were also closed, as well as portions of Bureau of Land Management-managed land and portions of White River National Forest. Air support was immediately brought in due to the fire's hard-to-reach location in the canyon.

The fire grew rapidly with Red Flag winds and by the morning of August 13 it spread east towards Bair Ranch and southeast into Devil's Hole Canyon and doubled in size from 6,251 acres (2,530 ha) to 13,441 acres (5,439 ha). It was one percent contained. Highway 82 was closed at Independence Pass due to excessive traffic and accidents resulting from drivers using rural, rugged dirt roads as alternatives to Interstate 70, which remained closed. The next day, on August 14, the Bureau of Land Management closed recreational sites and boat ramps around the southern part of the Colorado River near Dotsero. The fire spotted across Coffee Pot Rd. on August 15, with crews catching the spot fire before it could spread. The fire did continue towards Bair Ranch, with dozer lines being put in place to protect the core of the ranch. Air quality health advisories were put in place for areas east of the fire.

Due to the fire's location near infrastructure, residences and its potential impact on the environment, Burned Area Emergency Response teams arrived early on the scene, on August 19. That same day, it was reported that the Shoshone Hydroelectric Power Plant's service was interrupted by downed transmission lines.

On August 20, evacuation orders were downgraded for residents in the Buck Point area. The next day, containment was achieved from Coffee Pot Road to I-70. That same day, it was announced that Dan Gibbs, the head of Colorado's Department of Natural Resources and a wildland firefighter was fighting the fire near Glenwood Springs.

I-70 was reopened the morning of August 24. Later that day, a flare up along the interstate resulted in a second, temporary closure while helicopters quelled the flare up with water drops. By August 26, the fire was 61 percent contained at 32,060 acres (12,974 ha).

Containment continued to grow and suppression work began in impacted areas, including on Coffee Pot Rd. On the afternoon of August 30, a storm generated wind gusts of 40 MPH, resulting in crews being pulled from fire lines. The fire was determined to be human caused, with further investigation required to determine specificities.

== Impact ==
The Grizzly Creek Fire has impacted infrastructure, transportation and recreational activities in the area, including in White River National Forest.

=== Closures and evacuations ===
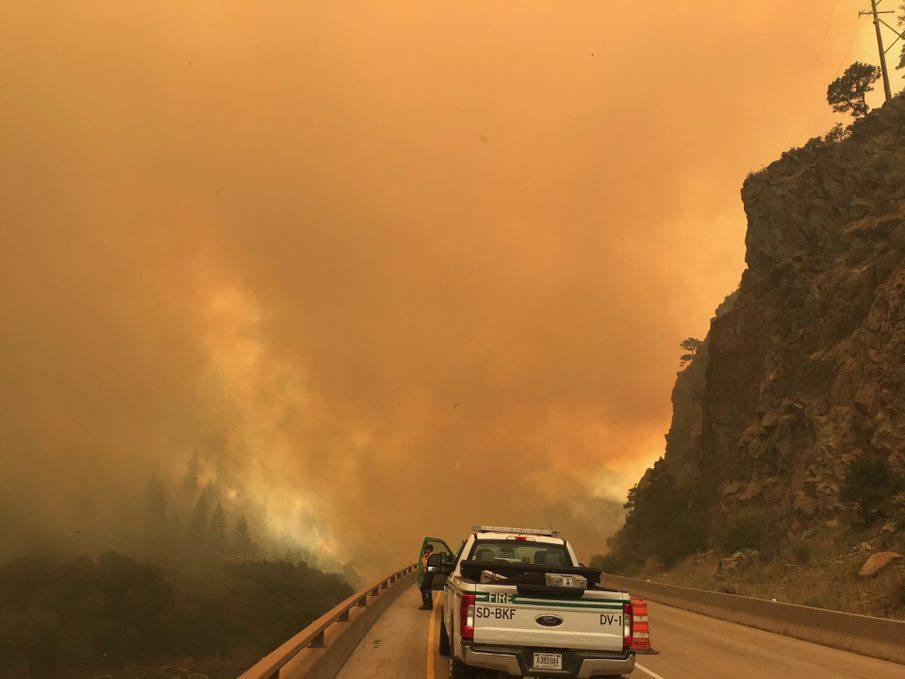
The Grizzly Creek Fire burning along Interstate 70 on August 11, 2020

The Grizzly Creek Fire caused a section of I-70 between Glenwood Springs and Gypsum in Glenwood Canyon to be closed on August 10, 2020. It was reopened by CDOT the morning of August 24, 2020. Local roads were also closed in the area, including Highway 82 which passes over Independence Pass.

The communities of No Name, Lookout Mountain (Glenwood Springs) and Coulter Creek were evacuated and the Glenwood Springs Community Center served as an evacuation point. Portions of White River National Forest were also closed, including Glenwood Canyon.

A Union Pacific Railroad passenger and freight line was closed in the area after debris falling caused a rock pile to form on the tracks. Train travel resumed by August 22.

Nearly a year later, the I-70 in Glenwood Canyon was closed again, due to debris flows from the fire damage.

=== Economic ===
The closures and evacuations resulted in cancelations on hotel and resort rooms by visitors in Glenwood Springs, exacerbating economic challenges from the COVID-19 pandemic. Due to the closure of Interstate 70 and other roads, local businesses were unable to keep groceries, pet food and other items in stock, resulting in empty shelves. There were also fuel shortages in the area.

=== Infrastructure ===
The Shoshone hydroelectric power plant lost transmission lines, resulting in a service interruption.

=== Environmental ===
The Colorado River's clarity was impacted with sediment from burned areas being carried into the river from rain. It will take an estimated five to seven years for the river's clarity to return to normal. The increased sediment will impact fishing, rafting and will increase rock slides. The river will begin to dilute where it meets the Roaring Fork River and sediment is expected to be found in Lake Powell.

== Investigation ==
On August 31, the US Forest Service confirmed that the fire was human-caused and that further investigation was required to determine the specific cause.

== Gallery ==
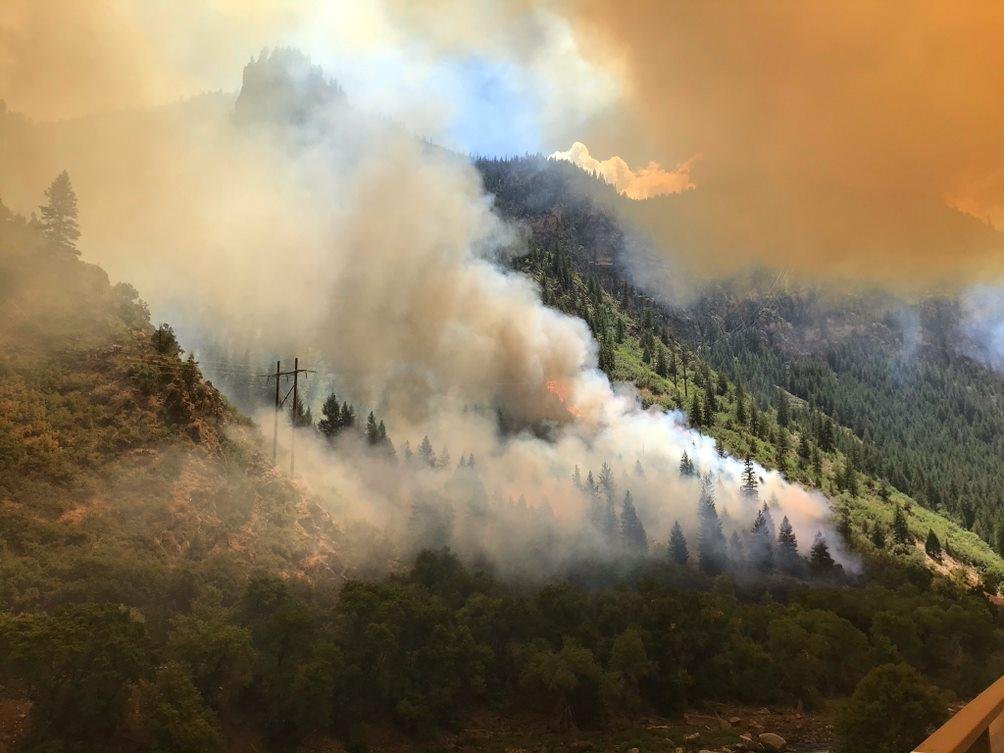
Fire growing on the slopes south of the Colorado River on August 12

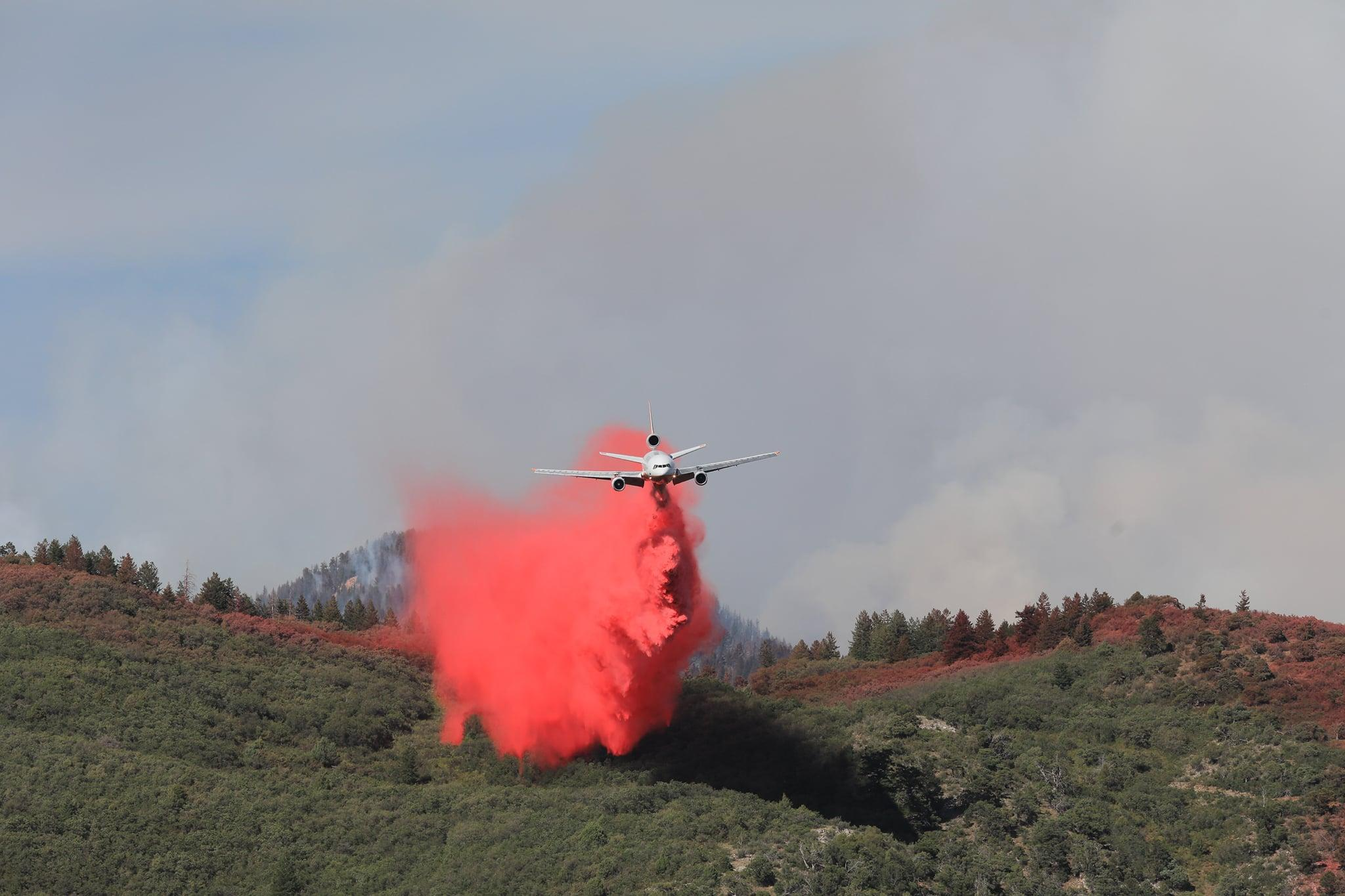
Tanker dropping fire retardant on August 13

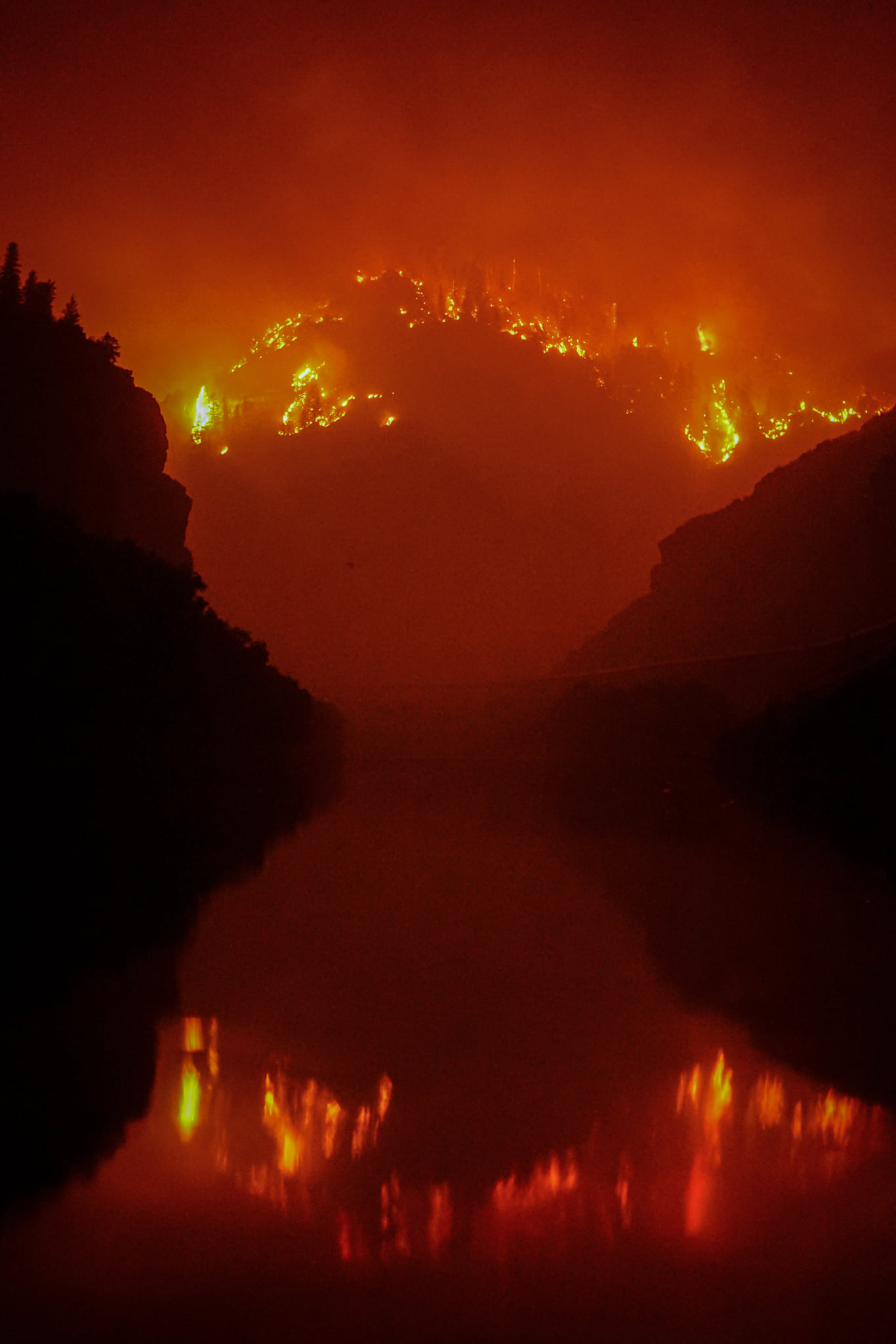
Fire burning along the Colorado River on August 14

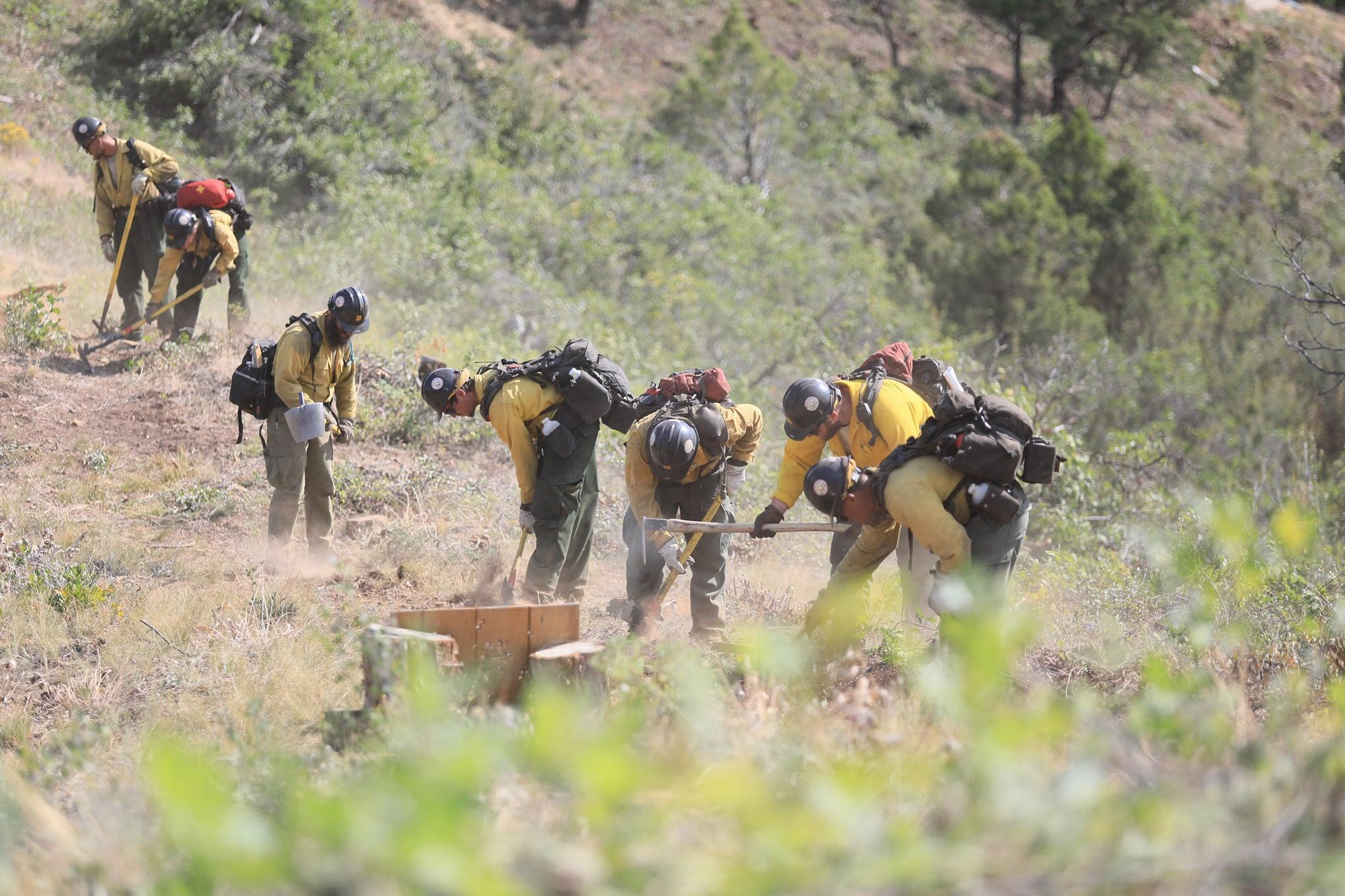
Hand crews clearing brush to protect structures near Glenwood Springs

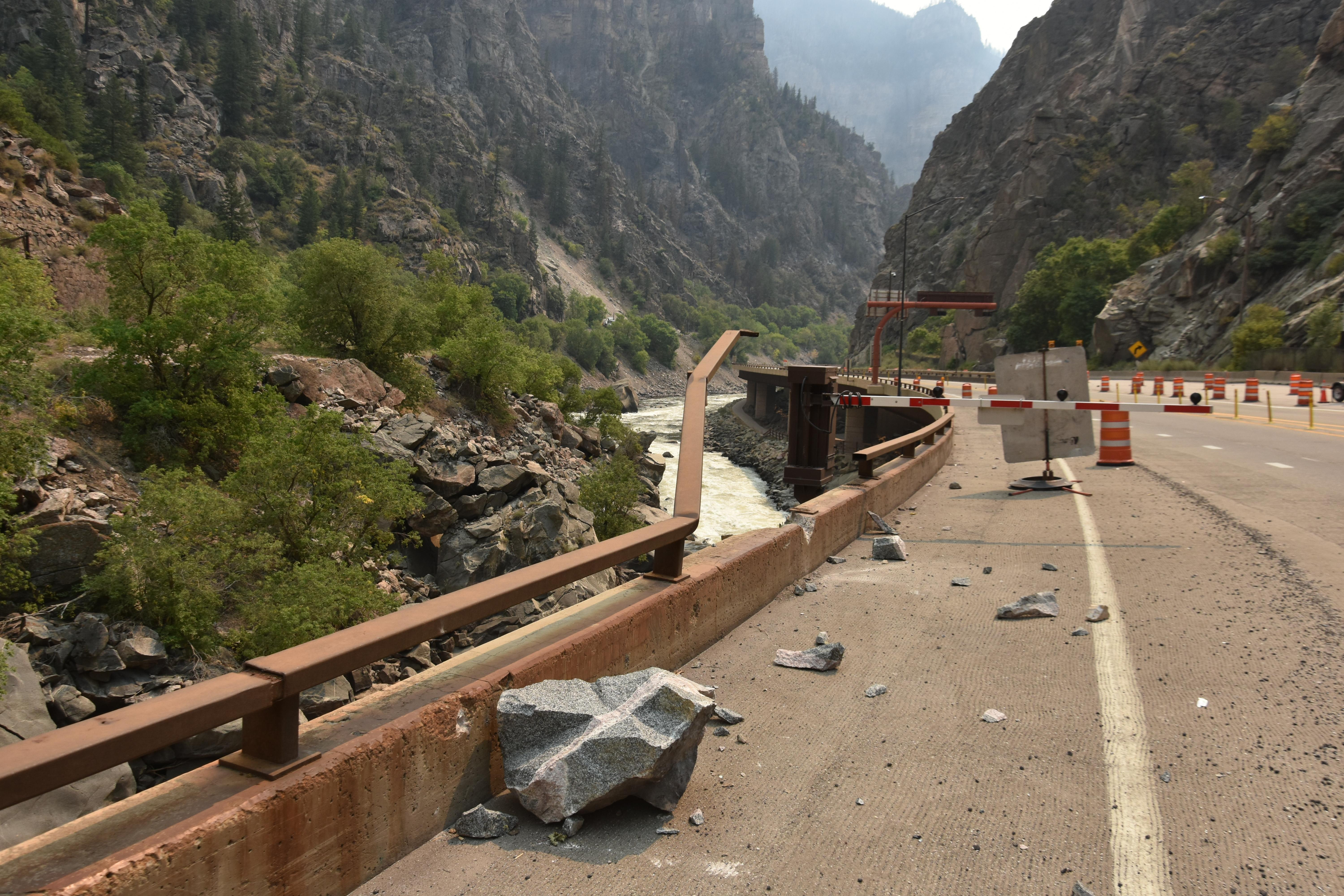
Rock fall on Interstate 70

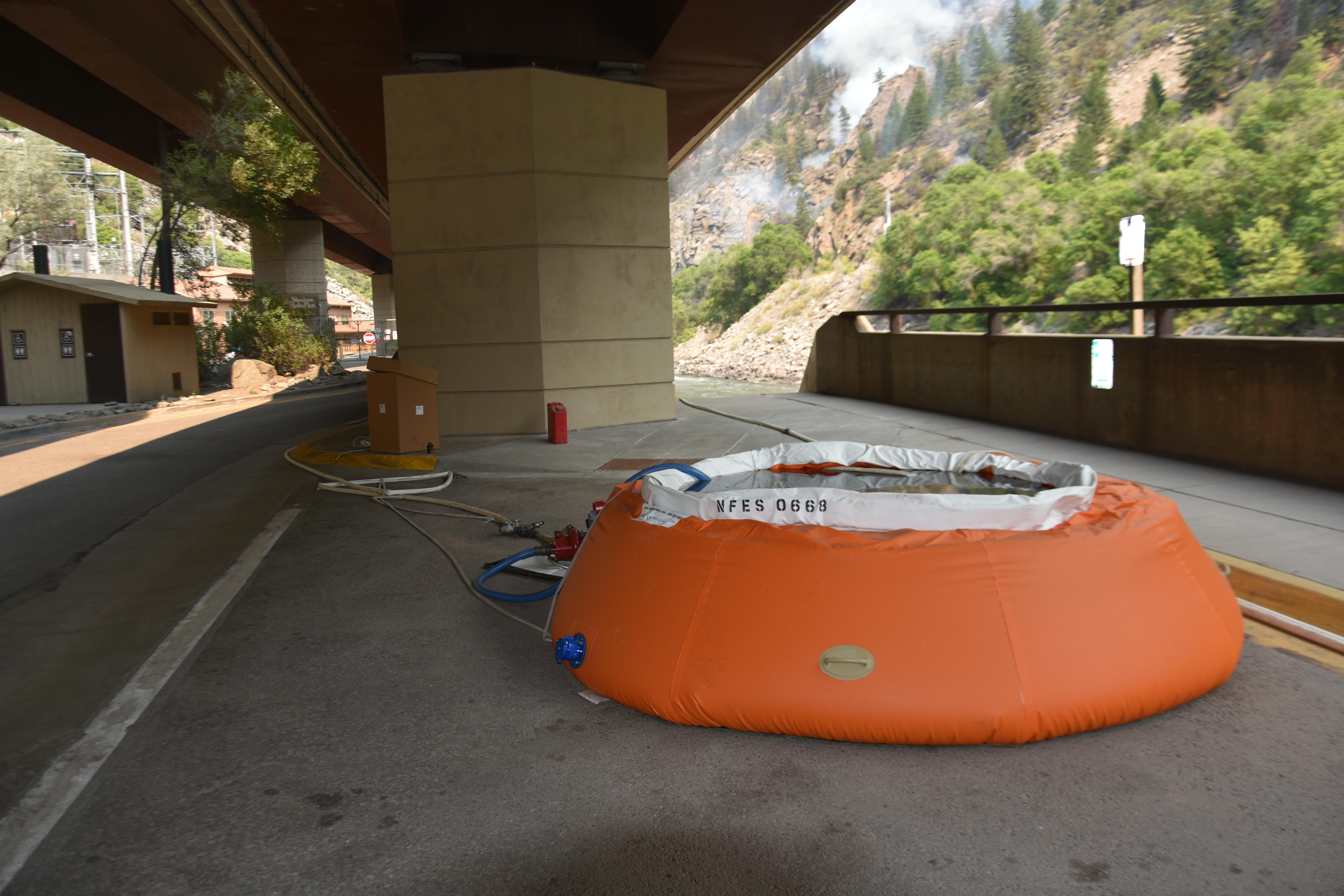
Portable water tanks

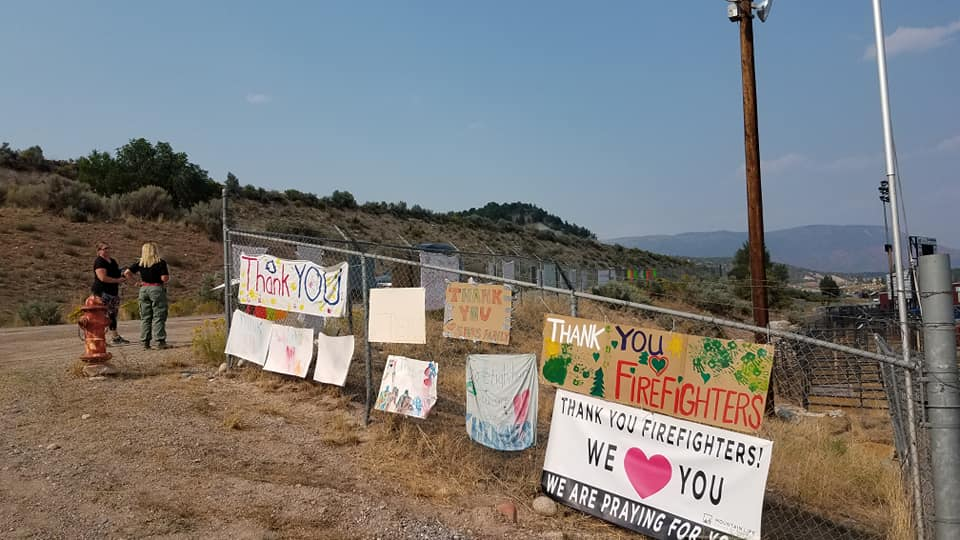
Signs of gratitude for firefighters in Eagle, Colorado.

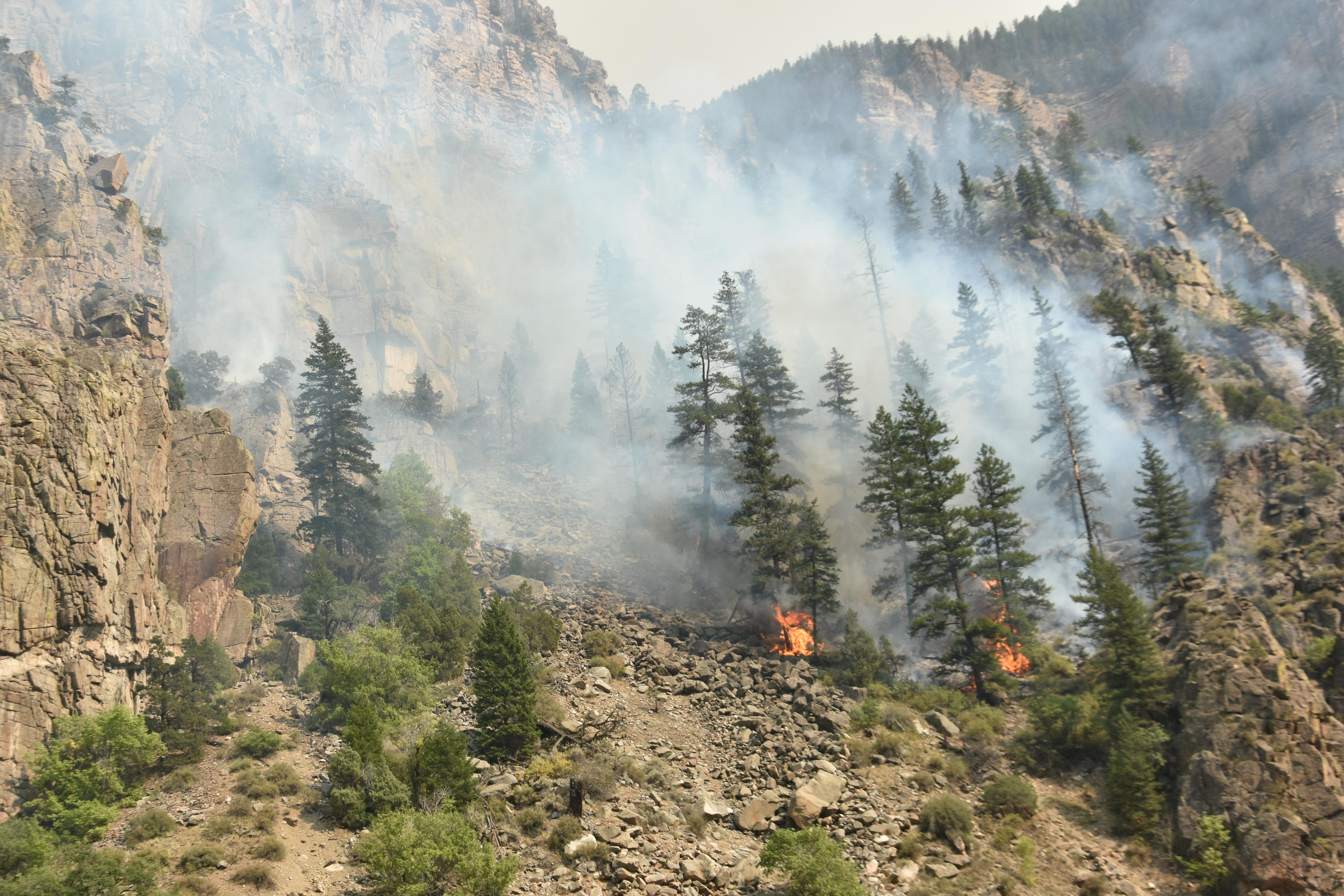
Grizzly Creek Fire burning in Glenwood Canyon on August 23

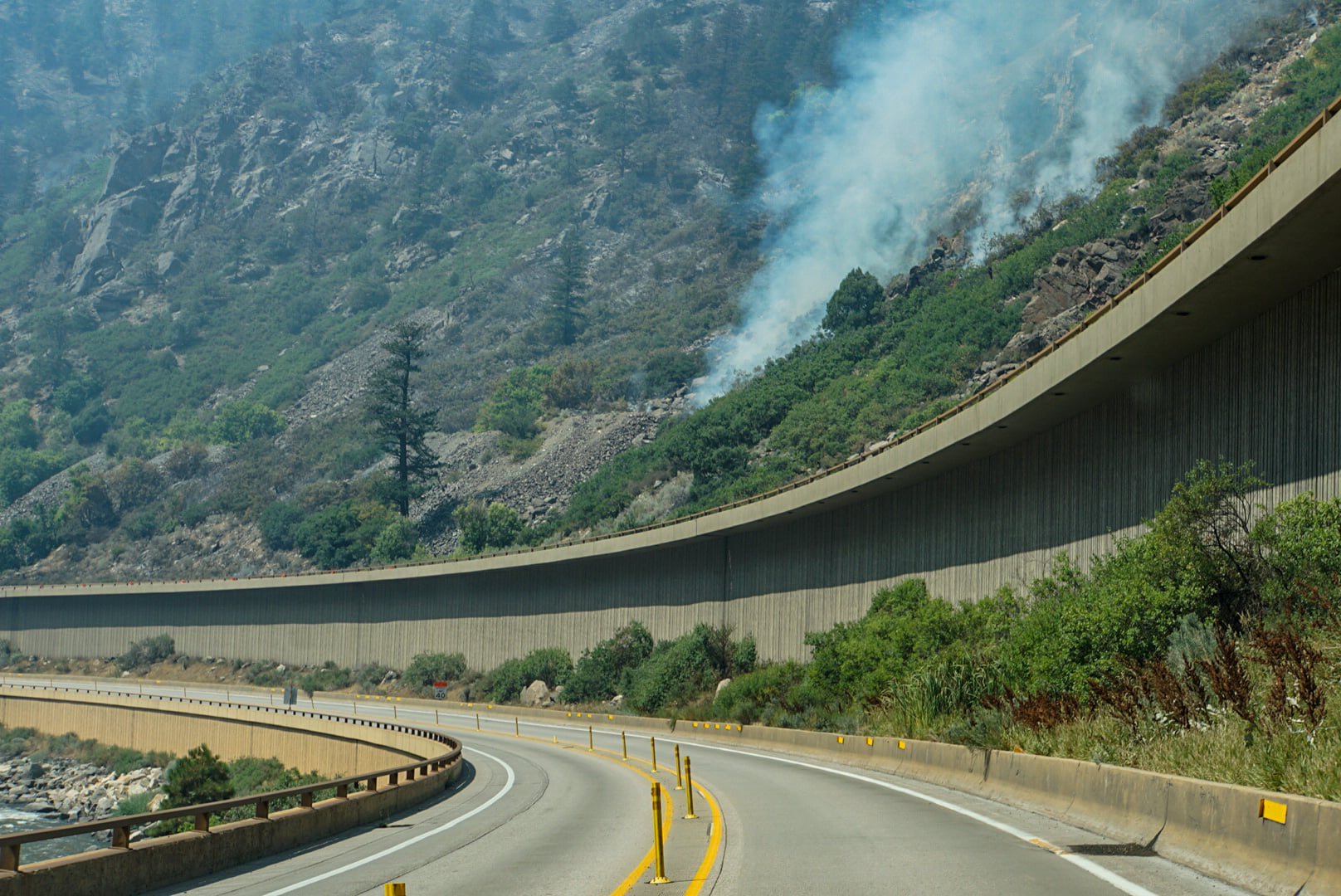
The fire burning next to Interstate 70 on August 23

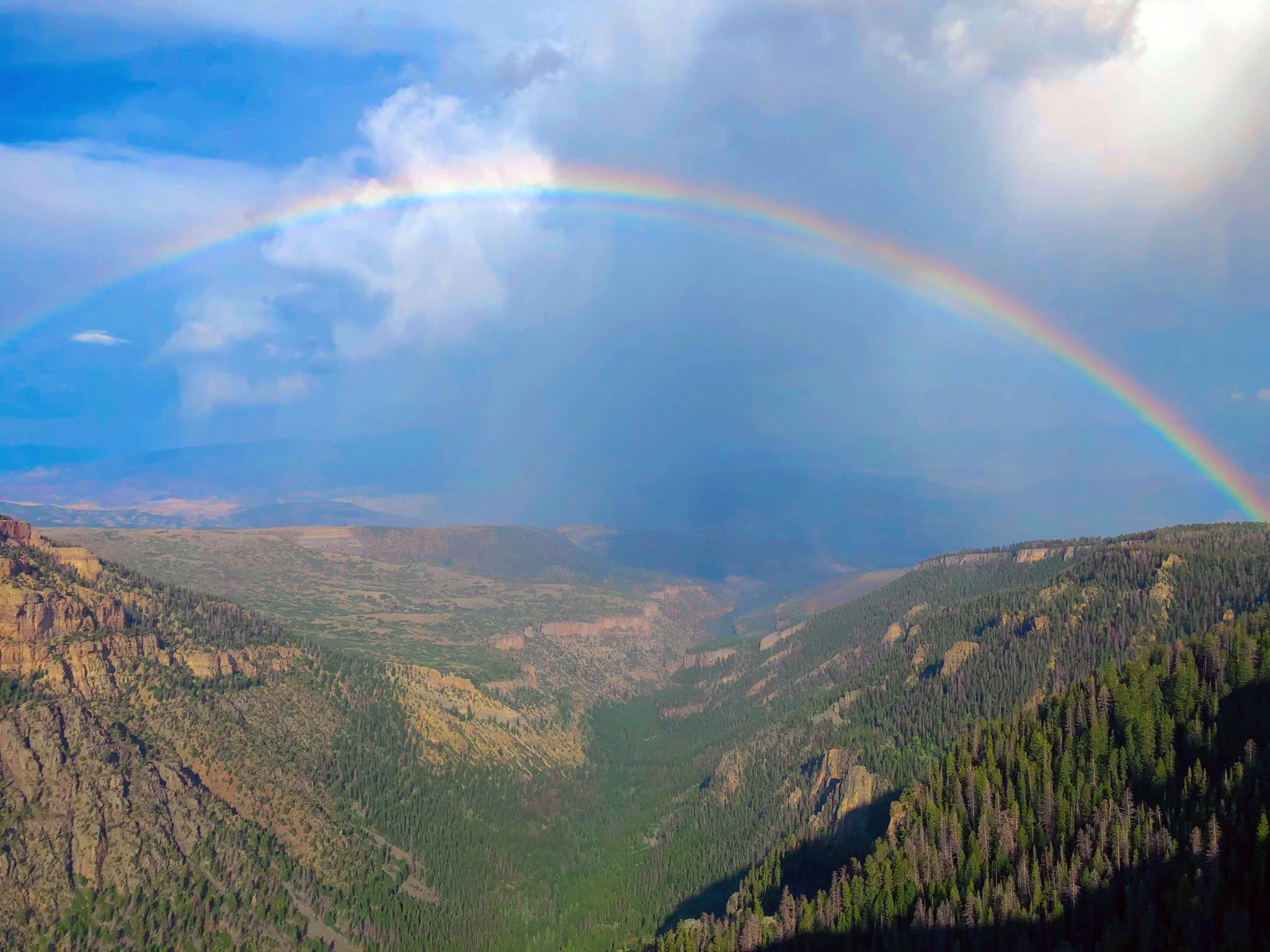
Rainbow over the fire on August 30

== See also ==
- List of Colorado wildfires
- 2020 Colorado wildfires
  - Pine Gulch Fire, a concurrent wildfire near Grand Junction, Colorado
  - Cameron Peak Fire, a concurrent wildfire near Fort Collins, Colorado
    - Lake Christine Fire wildfire in 2018, Roaring Fork Valley, Colorado
