= 2020 Colorado wildfires =

Series of fires in Colorado, United States

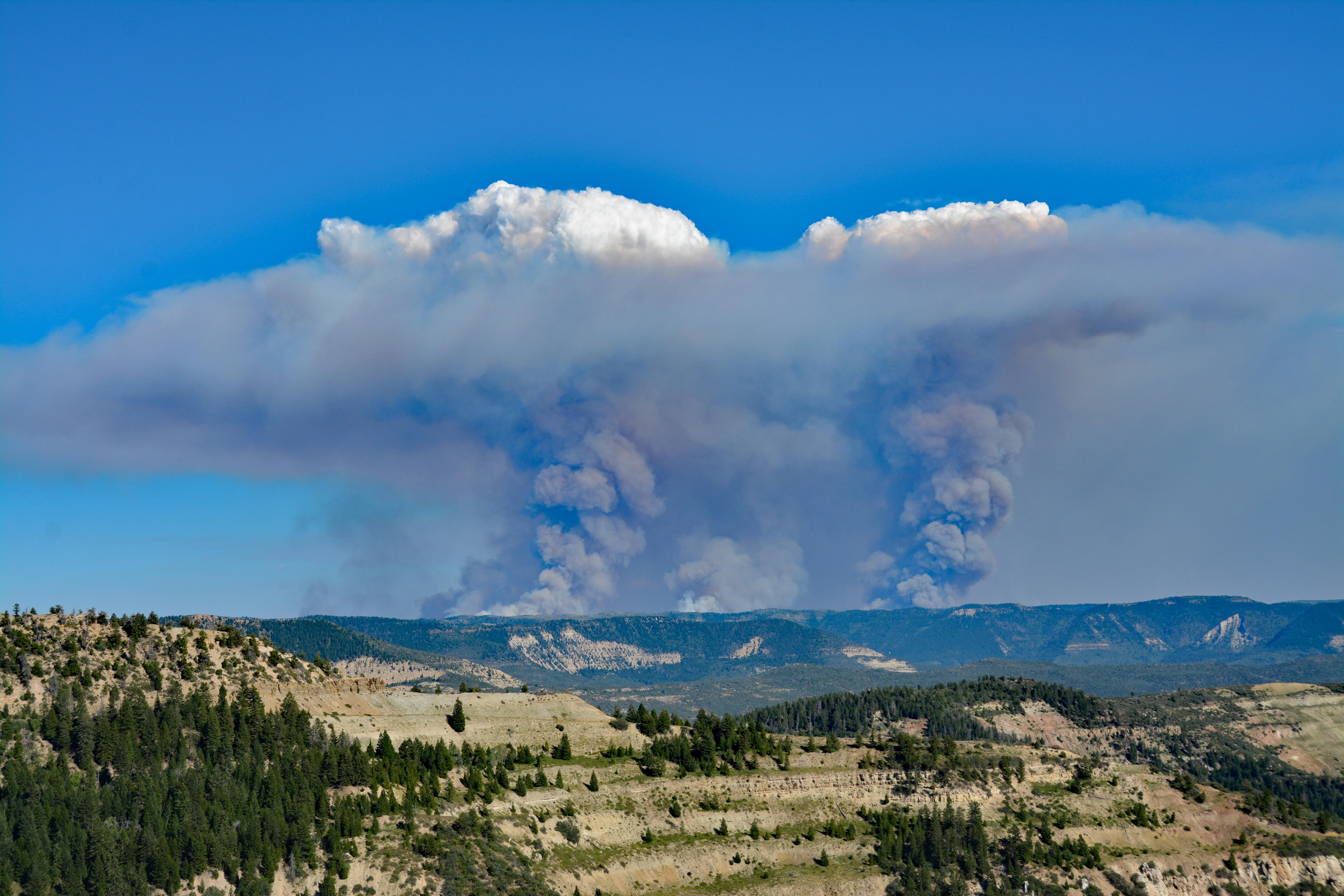

Statistics
- Total fires: 1,078
- Total area: 665,454 acres (269,300 ha)

Impacts
- Deaths: 2
- Cost: >$266 million (suppression)

The 2020 Colorado wildfire season was a series of significant wildfires that burned throughout the U.S. state of Colorado as part of the 2020 Western United States wildfire season. With a total of 665,454 acres (269,300 ha) burned, and the 3 largest fires in state history, it is Colorado's largest wildfire season on record.

During this season, the Cameron Peak Fire burned 208,913 acres, making it the largest wildfire recorded in the state of Colorado after it surpassed the Pine Gulch Fire, which earned the title seven weeks prior. Also surpassing the Pine Gulch Fire in size was the East Troublesome Fire, which, when fully contained on November 30, had burned a total of 193,812 acres. In total, the suppression costs for the fires during the 2020 season amounted to at least $266 million (2020 USD). Throughout the year thousands of people were forced to evacuate, including the whole town of Estes Park during the East Troublesome fire. Air quality was poor as well through much of the fire season, especially during the Cameron Peak and East Troublesome fires.

== Background ==
While "fire season" varies every year based on different weather conditions, most wildfires occur between May and September with a fire risk year-round with an increasing danger during winter. Drought and decreasing snowpack levels and lowering snowmelt and runoff increase fire risk. These conditions, along with increased temperatures and decreased humidity, are becoming more common from climate change. Vegetation growth provides an ample fuel for fires. From 2011 to 2020, Colorado experiences an average of 5,618 wildfires each year that collectively burn about 237,500 acres (96,100 ha).

== List of wildfires ==
The following is a list of fires that burned more than 1,000 acres (400 ha), or produced significant structural damage or casualties.

Name	County	Acres	Start date	Containment date (Note: Containment means that fire crews have established and secured control lines around the fire's perimeter. These lines are artificial barriers, like trenches or cleared vegetation, designed to stop the fire's spread, or natural barriers like rivers. Containment reflects progress in managing the fire but does not necessarily mean the fire is starved of fuel, under control, or put out.)	Notes	Ref
Bent Fort	Otero	1,500	April 11	April 13	Human-caused.	
PCMS Complex	Las Animas	2,175	May 16	May 21	Unknown cause.	
Villegreen	Las Animas	1,731	May 18	May 18	Human-caused.	
Cherry Canyon	Las Animas	11,818	May 20	May 27	Caused by lightning.	
Bent Canyon	Las Animas	1,800	June 4	June 11	Caused by lightning.	
Barela	Las Animas	2,521	June 5	June 5	Caused by lightning.	
Sieber	Mesa	1,094	June 5	June 9	Unknown cause.	
Deer Canyon	Las Animas	3,872	June 6	June 20	Caused by lightning.	
Fawn Creek	Rio Blanco	3,226	July 13	July 23	Caused by lightning.	
East Canyon	La Plata, Montezuma	2,905	June 14	June 27	Caused by lightning.	
County Road T	Kiowa	1,201	June 15	June 16	Human-caused.	
Prowers	Prowers	1,472	June 17	June 17	Human-caused.	
Streeter	Moffat	1,639	July 7	July 27	Human-caused.	
Sunday	Weld	2,000	July 19	July 19	Unknown cause.	
Pine Gulch	Mesa, Garfield	139,007	July 31	September 22	Caused by lightning. It was the largest wildfire in Colorado history until it was surpassed by the Cameron Peak Fire seven weeks later. 6 structures destroyed	
Grizzly Creek	Garfield, Eagle	32,631	August 10	December 18	Human-caused. 3 structures destroyed.	
Cameron Peak	Larimer	208,913	August 13	December 2	Unknown cause. It is the largest wildfire in Colorado history. 469 structures destroyed, 8 structures damaged.	
Williams Fork	Grand	14,833	August 14	November 15	Human-caused.	
Deter-Winters	Adams	2,000	August 19	August 19	Unknown cause.	
Shamrock	Adams	4,200	August 19	August 19	Unknown cause.	
East Fork	Las Animas	1,682	August 22	September 24	Caused by lightning. Burned in two state wildlife areas.	
Middle Fork	Routt, Jackson	20,517	September 6	November 17	Caused by lightning.	
Mullen	Jackson, Carbon (WY), Albany (WY)	176,878	September 17	December 3	Unknown cause. The fire started in Wyoming, and crossed into Colorado on September 30. Sixty-six structures destroyed.	
East Troublesome	Grand, Larimer	193,812	October 14	November 30	Unknown cause, 580 structures destroyed, 2 fatalities. As it underwent an explosive burst of growth on October 21, the fire created a huge pyrocumulonimbus cloud that rose to about 40,000 ft (12,000 m).	
Calwood	Boulder	10,106	October 17	November 19	Unknown cause, 28 structures destroyed.	

== See also ==
- 2020 Western United States wildfire season
- Colorado State Forest Service
- List of Colorado wildfires
- Wildfires in the United States
