= Chambers Lake (Colorado) =

Reservoir in Larimer County, Colorado, United States

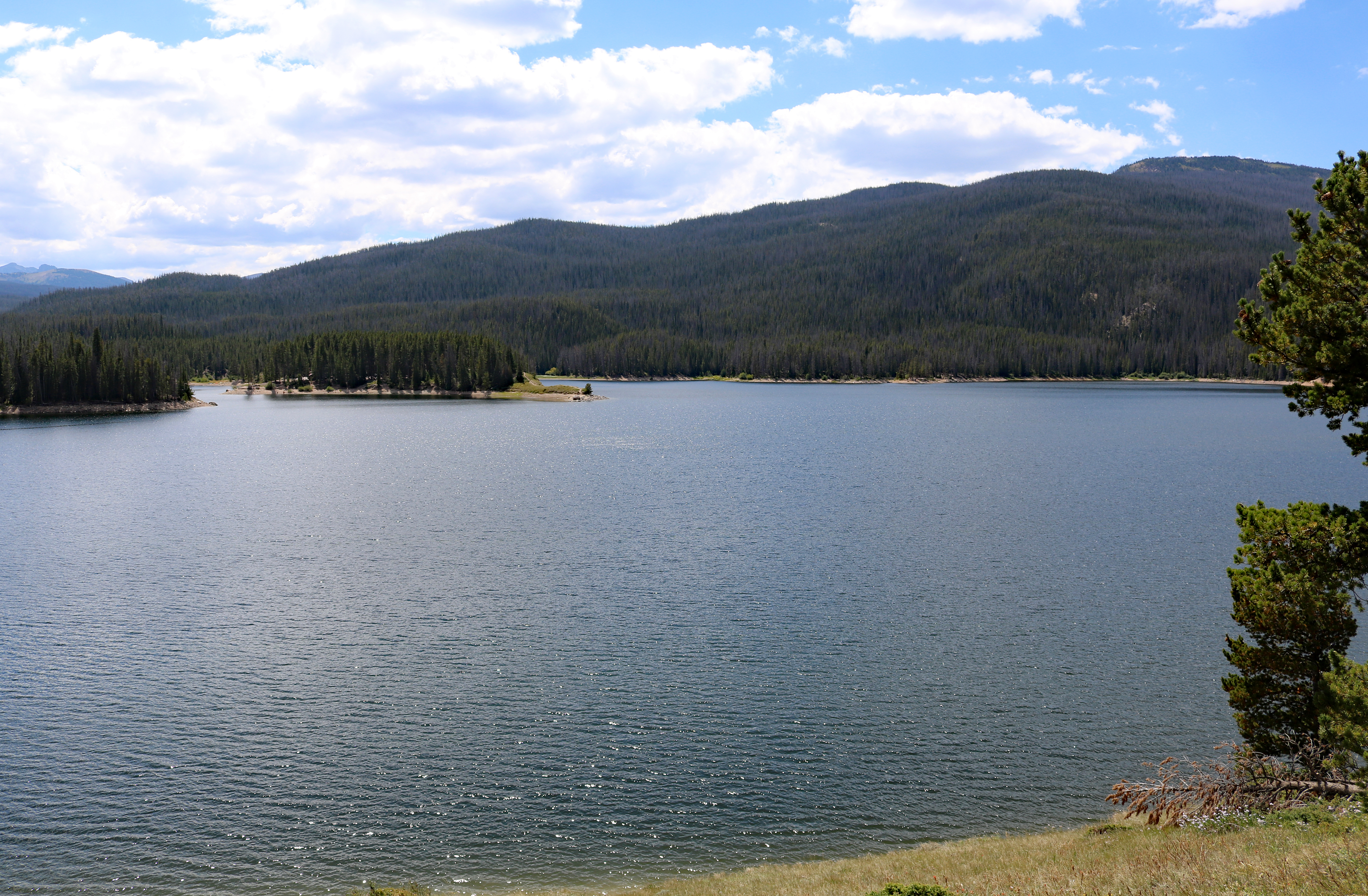
- Chambers Lake, August 2017

- Location in Colorado
- Location: Larimer County, Colorado
- Coordinates: 40.6045224°N 105.8533750°W
- Type: Reservoir
- Etymology: Named for Robert Chambers, a trapper who camped at the site in 1858
- Primary inflows: Fall Creek, Skyline Ditch, Joe Wright Creek
- Primary outflows: Joe Wright Creek
- Managing agency: The Water Supply and Storage Company
- Surface area: 255 acres (103 ha)
- Water volume: 11,350 acre⋅ft (14,000,000 m^{3})
- Surface elevation: 2,791 m (9,157 ft)

Chambers Lake is a reservoir in the Roosevelt National Forest in Larimer County, Colorado, United States. The reservoir supplies water for irrigation and municipal water supply.

== Description ==
The reservoir supplies water for irrigation and municipal water supply and is owned by the Water Supply and Storage Company, based in Fort Collins. The city of Thornton owns a large proportion of the company's stock. Water from the reservoir makes its way to the Cache la Poudre River. It then flows down through Poudre Canyon to Colorado's Eastern Plains, where it is distributed.

== History ==
The current dam is the third one to exist at the reservoir. Earlier dams burst in 1891 and 1904, causing much flooding and damage downstream. The present dam was built in 1910 and later renovated to increase its height to 58 feet. The renovations were completed in 1928.

Chambers Lake receives water from Skyline Ditch, completed in 1894, and several creeks. The ditch carries water from the Laramie River, which is part of the North Platte River watershed. The lake itself and its drainage are part of the South Platte River watershed, so the ditch is an early example of an interbasin transfer in Colorado.

== Recreation ==
The Forest Service operates the Chambers Lake Campground, near the lake. Given the area's high altitude, the campground has a short season and is only open from about the end of June to the end of September.

The lake also offers fishing.

== See also ==
- List of dams and reservoirs in the United States
