= East Peak Fire =

2013 wildfire in Colorado, United States

- Part of the 2013 Colorado wildfires
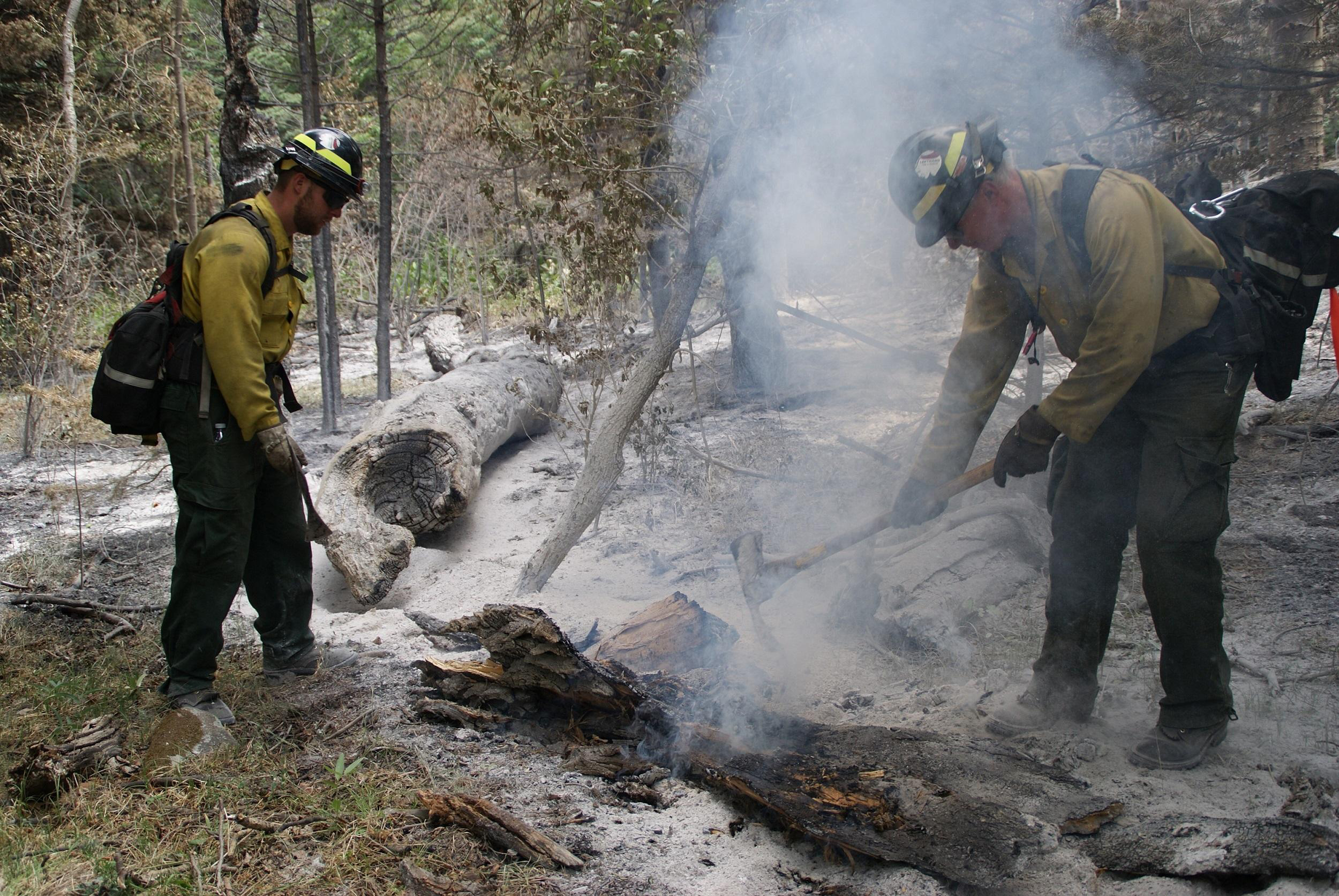
- Firefighters putting out burning embers on June 29 to keep the fire from rekindling.
- Date: June 19, 2013 – July 9, 2013
- Location: East side of East Spanish Peak, Huerfano County, Colorado
- Coordinates: 37.454°N 104.904°W

Statistics
- Burned area: 13,572 acres (55 km^{2})

Impacts
- Structures destroyed: 17

Ignition
- Cause: Lightning

Map
- Location of fire in Colorado

The East Peak Fire is a forest fire that began east of the East Spanish Peak near La Veta, Colorado at 5:10 PM on Wednesday, June 19, 2013. The fire was originally named the Scout Ranch Fire because the fire was first reported by the Spanish Peaks Scout Ranch.

== Events ==
The fire was first noticed by a Boy Scout on Wednesday, June 19 at Spanish Peaks Scout Ranch who saw smoke in the distance by the kitchen area of the camp, and a staffer who went closer to investigate and could see visible flames. All the Boy Scouts plus staff camping at Spanish Peaks Scout Ranch quickly evacuated the camp because the staff and scouts drill for such events. Many went to the open shelter at John Mall High School in Walsenburg, Colorado where The American Red Cross supplied food and blankets, and some left to go home after staying the night. Troop 369 took a stop at Carl's Jr. to use the bathroom and recollect before going to the high school. Some Boy Scout members had to be rescued by a helicopter due them hiking up a mountain that week.

By the following day the fire had grown to over 1,000 acres (4.0 km^{2}) with zero percent containment. Strong winds resulted in the fire making runs to the east and southeast. The entire town of Walsenburg was placed under pre-evacuation status. On Friday, June 21, officials reported the fire to be 9,000 acres (36 km^{2}) and that at The Spanish Peaks Scout Ranch 9 structures and 4 out-buildings had been destroyed.

On July 9, the fire was contained after burning 13,572 acres (54.92 km^{2}) of land with Walsenburg undamaged.

== See also ==
- 2013 Colorado wildfires
- Black Forest fire, another wildfire in Colorado beginning the week before
- Royal Gorge fire, another wildfire in Colorado beginning the week before
- List of Colorado wildfires
