= Rocky Mountain Metropolitan Airport =

Airport in Broomfield, Colorado, United States

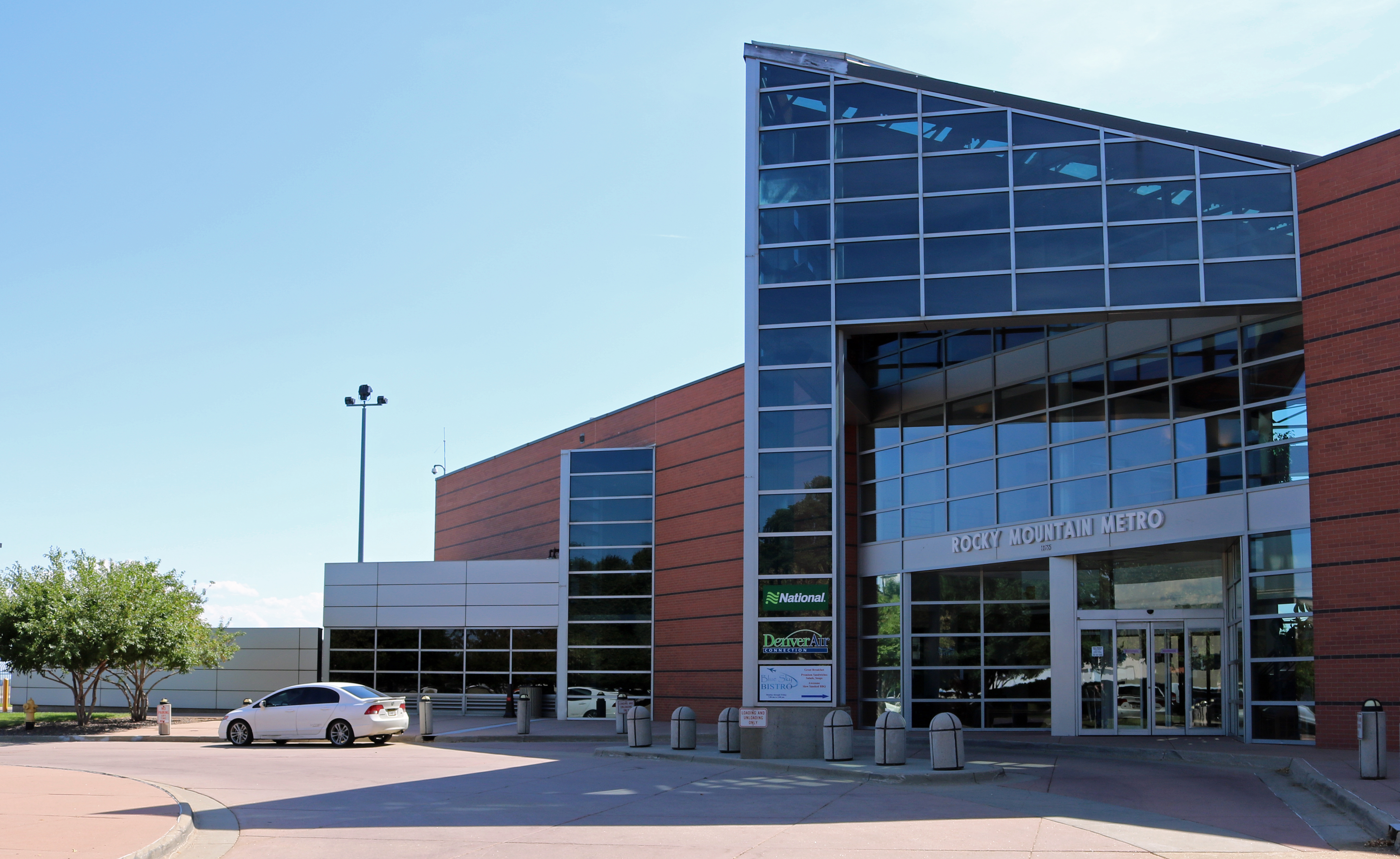
- Terminal building
- IATA: BJC; ICAO: KBJC; FAA LID: BJC

Summary
- Airport type: Public
- Owner/Operator: Jefferson County
- Serves: Denver metropolitan area
- Location: Broomfield, Colorado
- Opened: 1960; 66 years ago
- Elevation AMSL: 5,673 ft (1,729 m)
- Coordinates: 39°54′32″N 105°07′02″W
- Website: www.jeffco.us/airport

Maps
- FAA airport diagram

- Location of airport in Colorado / United States BJC/KBJC/BJC (the United States)

Runways
Direction	Length		Surface
Direction	ft	m	Surface
12L/30R	9,000	2,743	Asphalt
12R/30L	7,002	2,134	Asphalt
3/21	3,600	1,097	Asphalt

Statistics (2022)
- Aircraft operations: 262,348
- Based aircraft: 476
- Source: Federal Aviation Administration

Rocky Mountain Metropolitan Airport (IATA: BJC, ICAO: KBJC, FAA LID: BJC) is a public-use airport located in Broomfield, Colorado, United States. The airport is owned and operated by Jefferson County and is situated midway between Denver and Boulder on U.S. Highway 36. It is located 16 miles (26 km) northwest of the central business district of Denver, and is the closest airport to downtown Denver. The airport covers 1,700 acres (688 ha) and has three runways. Formerly known as Jefferson County Airport or Jeffco Airport, the airport was renamed Rocky Mountain Metropolitan Airport on October 10, 2006, although it is sometimes referred to as Rocky Mountain Regional Airport, e.g., on 2007–2012 county planning documents.

This airport is included in the National Plan of Integrated Airport Systems for 2011–2015, which categorizes it as a reliever airport. It is home to a large general aviation population including a fair amount of corporate traffic and several flight schools. The airport's proximity to the nearby Interlocken business district contributes to its business traveler clientele. It has a control tower on 118.6 MHz (local) and 121.7 MHz (ground) that is open from 0600 to 2200 local time. ATIS/AWOS broadcasts on 126.25 MHz. There are three runways—12/30 Left and Right and 3/21. The runway numbers were changed in November 2014 to reflect a change in magnetic variation. Two fixed-base operators (FBOs) offer fuel and other services.

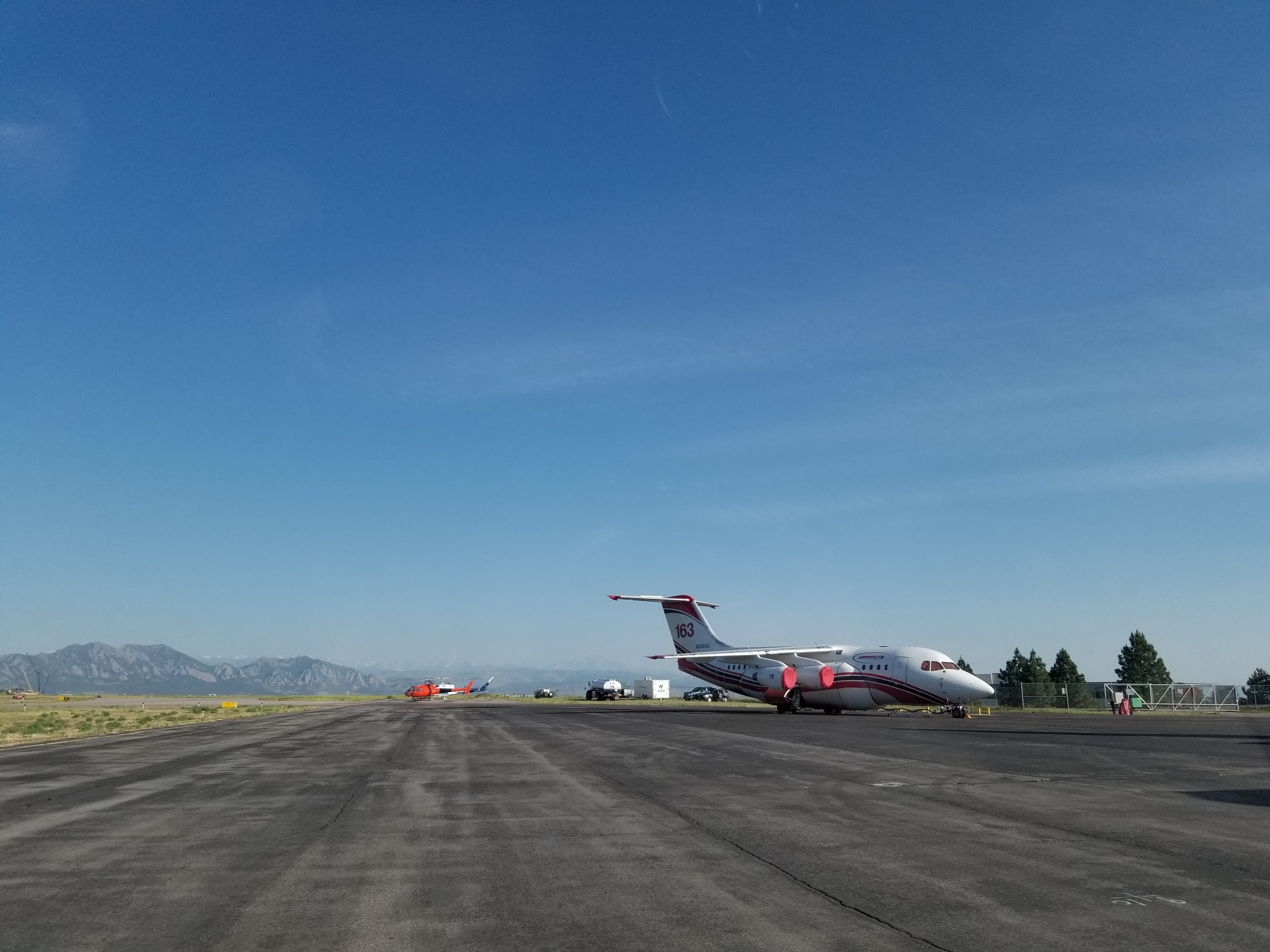
A BAe 146-RJ85A converted for aerial firefighting operations at Rocky Mountain Metropolitan Airport

== History ==
On February 7, 2012, the Federal Aviation Administration dedicated a new $23.7 million, state-of-the-art airport traffic control tower, located south of the airport runways. The new facility includes a 124-foot-tall control tower topped by a 525-square-foot tower cab with four air traffic controller positions and one supervisor position. A 6,000-square-foot, single-story base building houses administrative offices, training rooms, and equipment rooms.

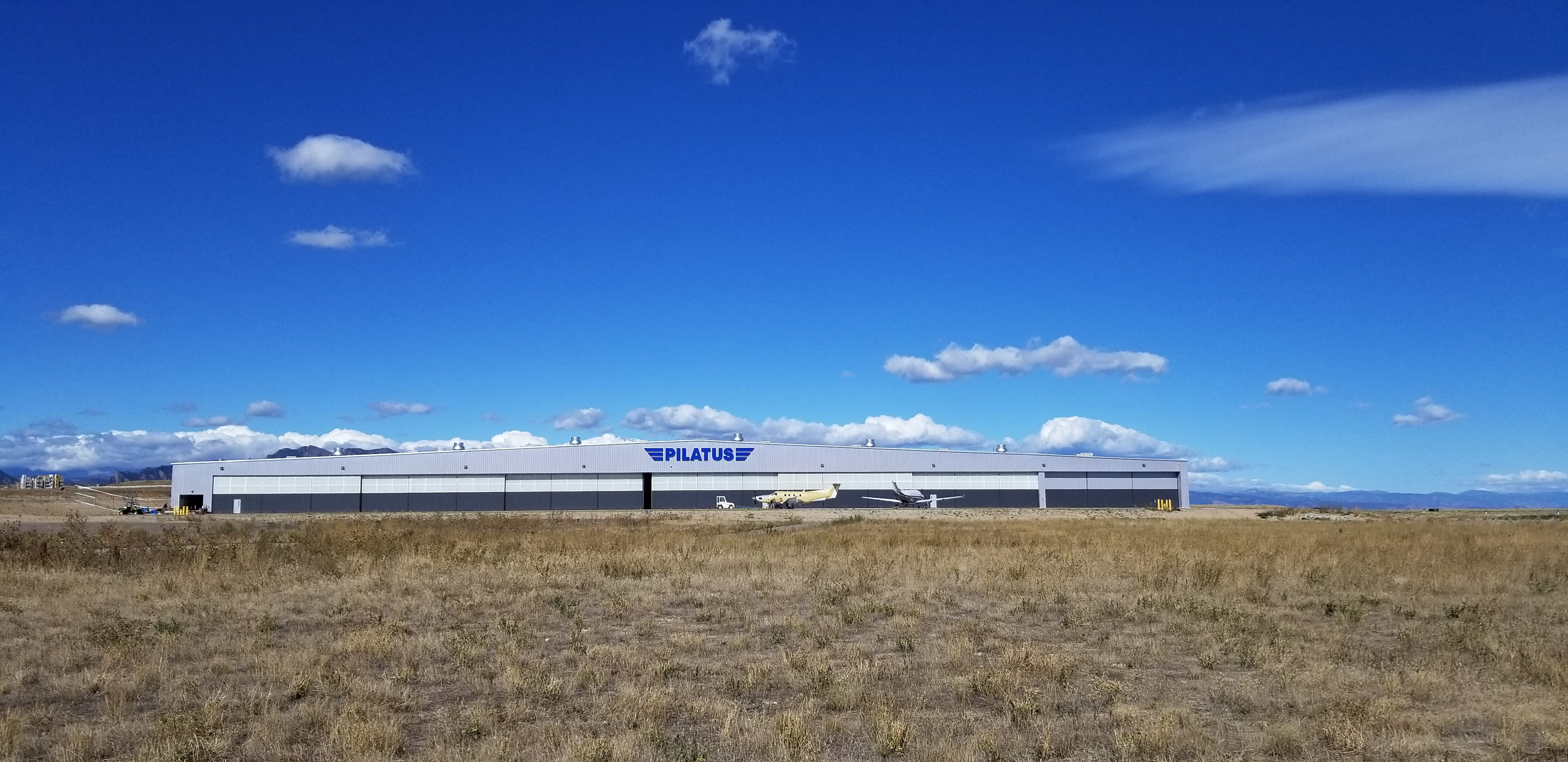
The Pilatus Aircraft hangar at Rocky Mountain Metropolitan Airport

In the summer of 2018, Pilatus Aircraft officially launched operations out of their newly constructed hangar located on the southwest corner of the airfield.

In the spring of 2018, the airport signed a lease agreement with a second FBO, SheltAir, to act as their "gateway to the west". SheltAir commenced operations in February 2019 with a temporary modular building located at the East Ramp area. Construction for the permanent building and hangar was expected to commence in the spring of 2019.

There exists a vacant tract of airport-owned land just southwest of the runways. As of 2015, there is a 30-year master plan by a development company to redevelop the area, known as Verve Innovation Park, for various aviation- and non-aviation-related uses.

== Facilities and aircraft ==
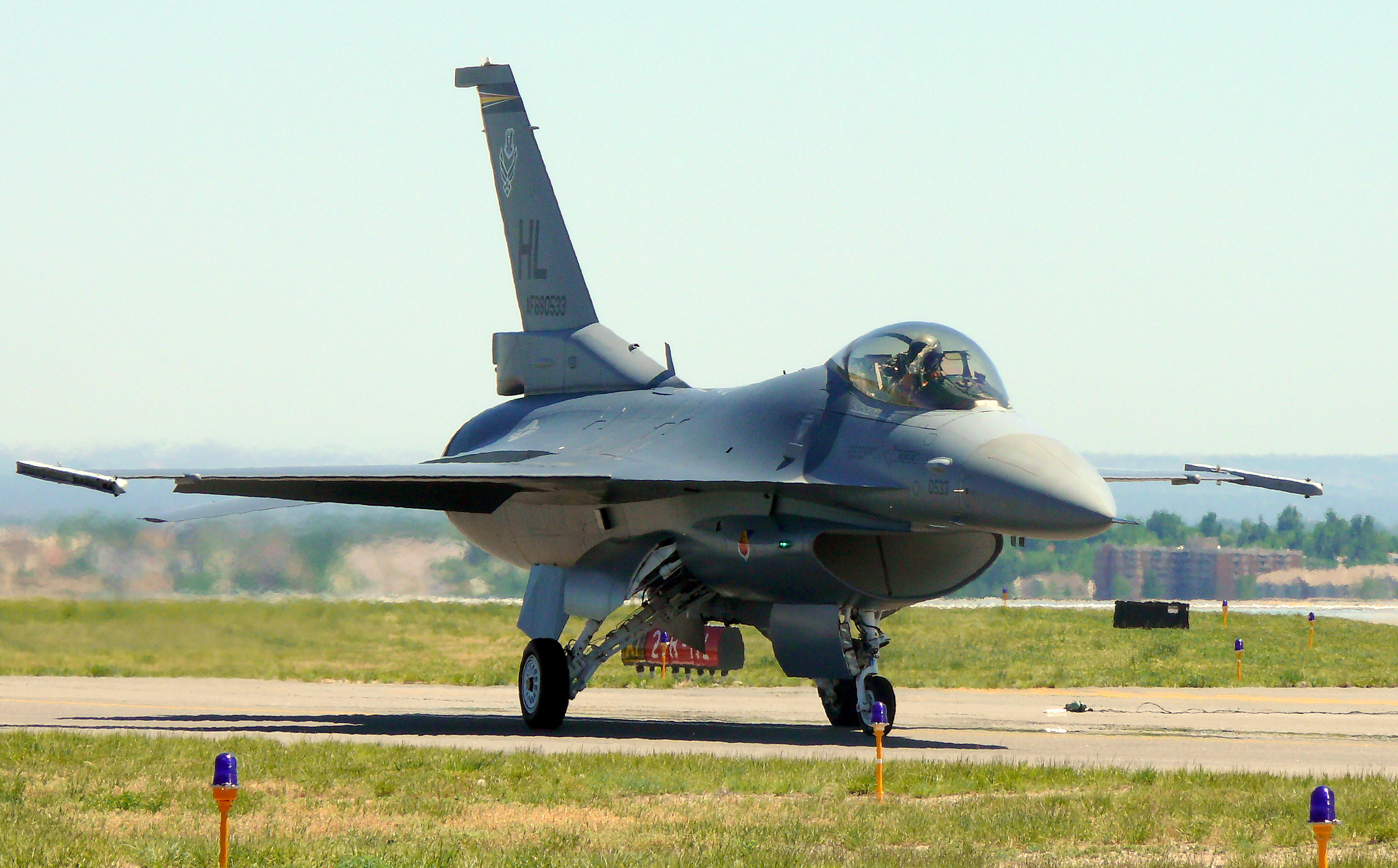
F-16 taxiing at Rocky Mountain Metropolitan Airport

Rocky Mountain Metropolitan Airport covers an area of 1,700 acres (688 ha) at an elevation of 5,673 feet (1,729 m) above mean sea level. It has three asphalt paved runways: 12L/30R is 9,000 by 100 feet (2,743 by 30 m); 12R/30L is 7,002 by 75 feet (2,134 by 23 m); 3/21 is 3,600 by 75 feet (1,097 by 23 m).

The airport's three runways, previously 11L/29R, 11R/29L, and 2/20, were renumbered in November 2014 in order to align them with magnetic directions. At the same time, the primary runway (12L/30R) underwent an $8.83 million renovation.

For the 12-month period ending December 31, 2022, the airport had 262,348 aircraft operations, an average of 718 per day: 95% general aviation, 4% air taxi, <1% military and <1% air carrier. At that time there were 476 aircraft based at this airport: 341 single-engine, 70 multi-engine, 43 jet, 21 helicopter, and 1 glider.

Two fixed-base operators (FBOs) operate at the airport: Signature Flight Support and Sheltair. On July 13, 2016, Pilatus Aircraft broke ground on a new 188,000 sq. ft. North American completion center for the new PC-24 business jet. The facility became fully operational in June 2018.

In December 2019, ATP Flight School opened its second Denver, Colorado training center at Rocky Mountain Metropolitan Airport. The other training facility is located at Centennial Airport.

In addition to commercial operations, the United States Forest Service (USFS) has a regional aerial firefighting operation at the Jeffco Airtanker Base. The Jeffco ATB, which opened in September 1983, has been instrumental in fighting such major Front Range forest wildfires as the June 2002 Hayman Fire, 2010 Four Mile Canyon fire and 2012 High Park fire. In 2014, the ATB operation was temporarily relocated to Fort Collins-Loveland Airport (Northern Colorado Regional Airport) for a few months while runways were repaved. In the busy firefighting season of 2020, Jeffco Airtanker Base helped fight major fires like Pine Gulch, Grizzly Creek, East Troublesome, Cal-Wood and Cameron Peak fires. For about 50 fires, airtankers used a record amount of fire-retardant slurry, some 1.7 million gallons. Although the raging Dec. 2021 Marshall Fire was just a few miles northwest, and within sight of, the airport, the relentless high winds, gusting past 100 MPH, prevented the use of any aerial resources that might have been assembled past the ATB's usual November closing date. A week later, when President Joe Biden went to Colorado to survey the fire damage, Air Force One landed at DIA, and the Bidens flew via helicopter to RMMA, from which the motorcade drove him to Louisville to see the damage and meet with the community.

== Airlines and destinations ==
The airport was formerly a hub for Pet Airways before the company ceased all flights in early 2013. Denver Air Connection also operated from RMMA to Grand Junction before consolidating their operations for the Denver–Grand Junction route to Centennial Airport in May 2017. JSX ended service on September 9, 2025.

== Accidents and incidents ==
- On July 1, 1997, a North American F-86 Sabre performing at an air show crashed killing the pilot. No spectators were hurt.
- On July 17, 2022, a Cessna 336 twin-engine plane operated by Bluebird Aviation went down outside Boulder, Colorado. The pilot and the three victims departed from Rocky Mountain Metropolitan Airport on a sightseeing trip to the mountains around Boulder, Colorado. Killed in the crash were the pilot, who was not immediately identified by authorities, 48-year-old Sandra Kirby of Louisiana, and her two children, 17-year-old Ian Kirby, and 13-year-old Amanda Kirby. The cause of the Colorado crash is under investigation.
- On September 18, 2022, a Cessna 172 that took off from this airport with two people on a training flight, collided in Boulder County with a Sonex aircraft that had taken off from the Platte Valley Airpark with only one person on board, its pilot. Both airplanes crashed and were destroyed on impact, killing all three people on board them.
- On December 20, 2025, a Beechcraft King Air equipped with Garmin Autoland successfully completed an unmanned emergency landing at the airport, marking the first time the system has been activated.

== See also ==
- List of airports in Colorado
