= List of Colorado wildfires =

Coordinates: 38.9972°N 105.5478°W

The location of the state of Colorado in the United States

This is a list of the most extensive, most destructive, and deadliest Colorado wildfires that have occurred in modern history.

During the severe 2002 Colorado wildfire season that burned nearly 619,029 acres, the Hayman Fire at 137,760 acres became the largest wildfire in Colorado state history. It held that title for nearly 20 years, until the Pine Gulch Fire surpassed it in August 2020. The Cameron Peak Fire became the largest wildfire in Colorado history seven weeks later, and ended up burning a total of 208,913 acres.

The 2012 Colorado forest fires broke the record for most destructive fire twice and led to declaration of a federal disaster area in June 2012. The 2013 Colorado forest fires, fueled by high heat and winds, again broke the record for the most destructive, and included what was the second largest fire (by area) in Colorado history, until being surpassed by several fires in 2020. With multiple record-breaking fires, the 2020 Colorado wildfire season became the largest in the state's history after burning 665,454 acres (269,300 ha).

According to CSU, wildfires in Colorado burned less than 100,000 acres (40,469 ha) per decade over the 1960s and the 1970s. For the 1980s and 1990s, the total was over 200,000 acres (80,937 ha) per decade. For the 2000s, the total was approximately 200,000 acres (80,937 ha).

Historically, FEMA has helped with recovery efforts. However, in April of 2026, for the first time in 35 years, FEMA has denied federal assistance as part of a major disaster. In August of 2025 the Lee and Elk fires, along with mudslides in Rio Blanco County, caused approximately $27 million in initial damage, and the flooding caused over $13 million.

== Background ==
While "fire season" varies every year based on different weather conditions, most wildfires occur between May and September with a fire risk year-round with an increasing danger during winter. Drought and decreasing snowpack levels and lowering snowmelt and runoff increase fire risk. These conditions, along with increased temperatures and decreased humidity, are becoming more common from climate change. Vegetation growth provides an ample fuel for fires. From 2011 to 2020, Colorado experiences an average of 5,618 wildfires each year that collectively burn about 237,500 acres (96,100 ha).

== Area burned per year ==
Starting in 2000, the National Interagency Fire Center began keeping more accurate records on the total fire acreage burned in each state, and has statistics going back to 1995.

Year	Fires	Acres	Ref
1995	2,224	32,011	
1996	1,800	46,600	
1997	1,605	16,703	
1998	1,428	8,826	
1999	1,978	33,255	
2000	2,043	76,288	
2001	2,966	45,816	
2002	4,600	619,029	
2003	3,957	43,858	
2004	2,814	35,303	
2005	2,969	41,048	
2006	4,515	214,979	
2007	3,914	26,515	
2008	2,883	149,891	
2009	3,991	74,549	
2010	4,289	80,708	
2011	5,203	176,720	
2012	6,114	426,403	
2013	4,906	222,916	
2014	3,733	23,357	
2015	3,442	26,318	
2016	5,572	122,517	
2017	6,036	111,284	
2018	7,092	467,424	
2019	7,318	53,744	
2020	6,716	744,120	
2021	6,679	56,056	
2022	8,370	56,403	
2023	7,175	40,996	
2024	8,541	36,207	
5-year average	6,273	95,342	

== The ten most extensive Colorado wildfires ==
As of July 2026, the ten most extensive wildfires in Colorado have been:

Rank	Name	County	Acres	Start date	Structures	Deaths	Notes
1	Cameron Peak	Larimer	208,913	August 2020	469	6	Burned over a span of 112 days. All deaths occurred in post-fire flood events related to the fire. Four people died in 2021, and two people died in 2022 from post-fire flash flood and debris flow events.
2	East Troublesome	Grand, Larimer	193,812	October 2020	555	2	The wildfire ran more than 100,000 acres in one day and jumped over the Continental Divide, prompting an evacuation of the entire town of Estes Park.
3	Pine Gulch	Mesa, Garfield	139,007	July 2020	1	0	Briefly became the largest wildfire in Colorado history.
4	Hayman	Douglas, Jefferson, Park, Teller	138,114	June 2002	600	6	Held the title of the largest wildfire in Colorado for 18 years. Five deaths were firefighters who died in an accident en route to the fire.
5	Lee Fire	Rio Blanco	137,758	August 2025	7	0	
6.	West Fork Complex	Hinsdale, Mineral	109,615	June 2013	0	0	Consists of multiple wildfires that burned in close proximity, including the West Fork Fire (58,570 acres) and the Papoose Fire (49,628 acres).
7	Spring Creek	Costilla, Huerfano	108,045	June 2018	140	0	
8	Aspen Acres	Custer, Pueblo	101,921	June 2026	850		Destroyed over 850 structures including 319 homes.
9	High Park	Larimer	87,415	June 2012	259	1	
10	Missionary Ridge	La Plata	73,000	June 2002	47	1	

== The ten most destructive Colorado wildfires ==
As of July 2026, the ten most destructive wildfires in Colorado have been:

Rank	Name	County	Acres	Start date	Structures	Deaths	Notes
1	Marshall	Boulder	6,026	December 2021	1,091	2	1,084 homes and 7 commercial buildings were destroyed, all within a 24-hour period beginning early on December 30.
2	Aspen Acres	Custer, Pueblo	101,921	June 2026	850		Destroyed over 850 structures including 319 homes.
3	Hayman	Douglas, Jefferson, Park, Teller	138,114	June 2002	600	6	Held the title of the largest wildfire in Colorado for 18 years. Five deaths were firefighters who died in an accident en route to the fire.
4	East Troublesome	Grand, Larimer	193,812	October 2020	555	2	The wildfire ran more than 100,000 acres in one day and jumped over the Continental Divide, prompting an evacuation of the entire town of Estes Park.
5	Black Forest	El Paso	14,280	June 2013	489	2	Was the most destructive fire in terms of number of homes lost until the Marshall Fire.
6	Cameron Peak	Larimer	208,913	August 2020	469	6	Burned over a span of 112 days. All deaths occurred in post-fire flood events related to the fire. Four people died in 2021, and two people died in 2022 from post-fire flash flood and debris flow events.
7	Waldo Canyon	El Paso	18,247	June 2012	346	2	
8	High Park	Larimer	87,415	June 2012	259	1	
9	Four Mile Canyon	Boulder	5,700	September 2010	162	0	
10	Spring Creek	Costilla, Huerfano	108,045	June 2018	140	0	

== The five deadliest Colorado wildfires ==
As of July 2026, these are the wildfires that have resulted in four or more deaths in Colorado:

Rank	Name	County	Acres	Start date	Structures	Deaths	Notes
1	South Canyon	Garfield	2,115	July 1994	0	14	All 14 deaths were firefighters.
2	Stable/Cheyenne Mountain	El Paso	32,000	January 1950	89	9	The wildfire spread rapidly with 70 mph gusts and threatened the Broadmoor Hotel.
3	Cameron Peak	Larimer	208,913	August 2020	469	6	Burned over a span of 112 days. All deaths occurred in post-fire flood events related to the fire. Four people died in 2021, and two people died in 2022 from post-fire flash flood and debris flow events.
4	Hayman	Douglas, Jefferson, Park, Teller	138,114	June 2002	600	6	Held the title of the largest wildfire in Colorado for 18 years. Five deaths were firefighters who died in an accident en route to the fire.
5	Snyder	Mesa, Grand (UT)	28,264	June 2026	0	4	Knowles Fire kills four helitack firefighters in burnover entrapment.

== See also ==
- Category:Lists of wildfires in the United States
- Bibliography of Colorado
- Geography of Colorado
- History of Colorado
- Index of Colorado-related articles
- List of Colorado-related lists
- Outline of Colorado
- Timeline of Colorado history
