= High Park fire =

2012 Wildfire in Larimer County, Colorado

High Park Fire
- Part of the 2012 Colorado wildfires
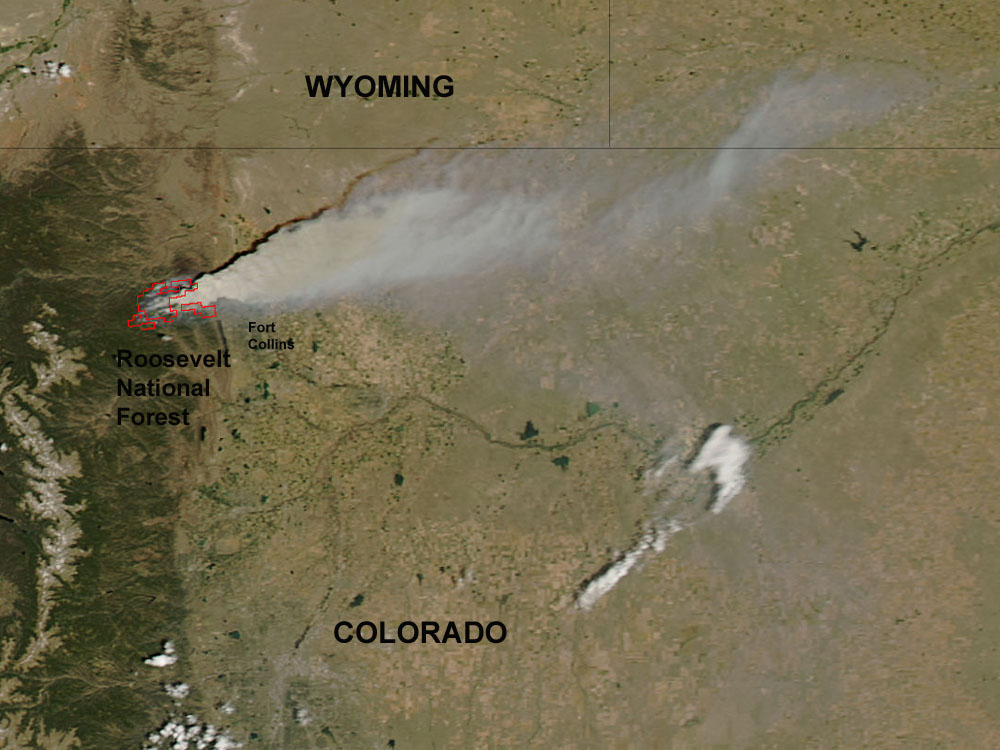
- June 10th satellite image by NASA
- Date: June 9, 2012 – June 30, 2012
- Location: Roosevelt National Forest, Larimer County, Colorado
- Coordinates: 40.589°N 105.404°W

Statistics
- Burned area: 87,284 acres (353 km^{2})

Impacts
- Deaths: 1
- Structures destroyed: 259

Ignition
- Cause: Lightning

Map
- Location within Colorado

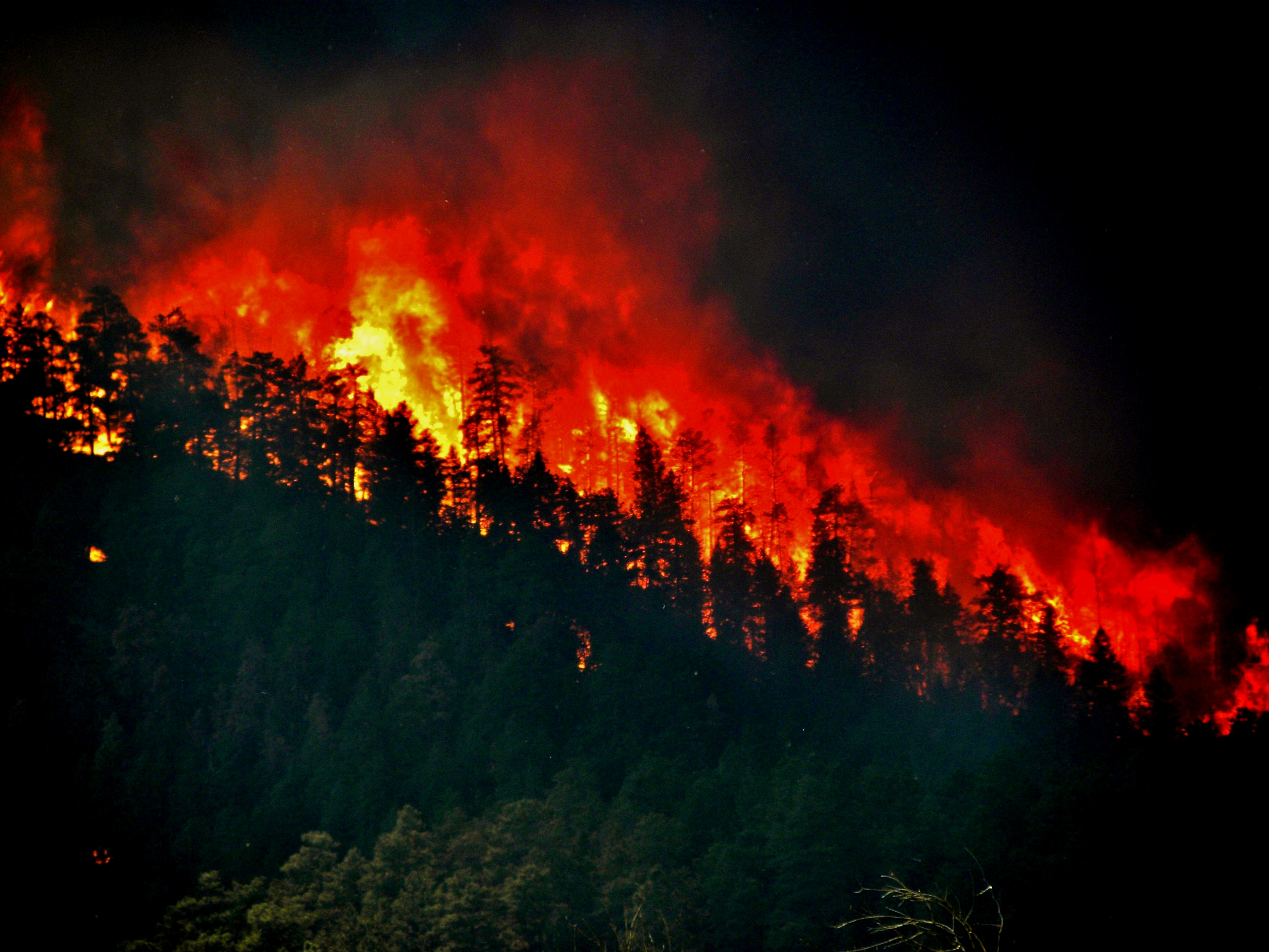
Trees torching in Roosevelt National Forest

The High Park fire was a wildfire in the mountains west of Fort Collins in Larimer County, Colorado, United States. It was caused by a lightning strike and was first detected on the morning of June 9, 2012. It was declared 100 percent contained on June 30, 2012, and all associated evacuation orders were lifted. Disambiguation. In 2022 there was another fire called "High Park Fire." That fire started on 05/12/2022 six miles west of Cripple Creek Colorado. The size at 89% containment (last report) was 1,572 acres. Since wildland fire names are typically assigned by personnel on the fire and often based on local knowledge, it is not unusual to have more than one fire with the same name.

A 62-year-old woman was killed in the fire.

The High Park fire burned over 87,284 acres (136.381 sq mi; 353.23 km^{2}), at the time it was the second-largest fire in recorded Colorado history by area burned. It is currently the sixth-largest fire in recorded Colorado history by area burned.

== Development ==
The High Park Fire was caused by lightning (the strike tree was located) and started in a difficult to access area above the Buckhorn Road in Larimer County Colorado. The fire was reported as a smoke column early in the morning on June 9, 2012. The area had been suffering from hot and dry conditions and fire danger was extreme. Multiple agencies responded for the initial attack, including http://www.rcvfd.org Rist Canyon Volunteer Fire Department (the fire started in RCVFD's area), Larimer County Emergency Services, Poudre Fire Authority, Poudre Canyon Fire Protection District, Colorado State Forest Service, USFS, and other local agencies. A SEAT (Single Engine Air Tanker) and helicopter were ordered immediately. The ignition point and foot of the fire was accessible only via 4wd road that would support apparatus no larger than Type 6x NWCG Engine Standards. The fire was named High Park as this is the local name for the area it burned.

Due to extreme burning conditions, poor access and rapid fire-spread, it became quickly clear the fire would impact multiple residential areas and evacuations were called for an increasing area through the day. Areas evacuated included Buckhorn Canyon, Paradise Parke, Stove Prairie, Flower Road, Rist Canyon, Paradise Park, Poudre Park, Poudre Canyon, Davis Ranch, Whale Rock, Pine Acres and other areas. The evacuation lasted nearly 21 days –– much longer than other large Colorado fires. Evacuation was conducted via reverse 911 calls, then by door-to-door visits by Fire Department and Law Enforcement. Since the area was served by overhead power and phone lines, power and phone were lost very rapidly. Furthermore, the area was not served by cellular service. These factors, plus damage to basic infrastructure, were key limiters in re-patriation. Residents would be returning to very dangerous conditions and with no effective communications. In total, High Park Fire destroyed more than 259 homes and many additional structures including RCVFD Fire Station 4.

High Park Fire burned aggressively and with high intensity for days. Two weeks after its ignition, the fire burned into a subdivision north of the Poudre River, where, despite days of preparation, it destroyed more than 50 additional homes on that day.

== See also ==
- 2012 Colorado wildfires
- Waldo Canyon Fire
- West Fork Complex
- 2013 Colorado wildfires
