= Colorado State Forest Service =

The Colorado State Forest Service (CSFS) is the forest service agency for the U.S. state of Colorado. It is modeled after the United States Forest Service. Their goal is "providing timely, relevant forestry information and education to Colorado citizens."

The Colorado General Assembly established the CSFS in 1955. It is headquartered at Colorado State University. In 1965 the CSFS was expanded to "provide for the protection of forest resources of the state from fire, insects and disease." Early efforts included addressing Dutch elm disease and mountain pine beetle infestations. The agency's programs were again expanded following passage of the Cooperative Forestry Assistance Act of 1978.

An Incident Command System was put in place in 1981, and the 1989 Black Tiger Fire in Boulder County, Colorado led to increased legislative activity. The agency's budget doubled following enactment of the federal National Fire Plan in response to nationwide fires in 2000. The 2002 Colorado wildfires were the worst in the state's recorded history, with over 2,000 fires burning 502,000 acres and forcing 81,000 residents to evacuate.

On June 4, 2012, the Colorado state legislature created the Colorado Division of Fire Prevention and Control (DFPC) within the Colorado Department of Public Safety, transferring firefighting responsibilities from CSFS.

== See also ==
- Hayman Fire
