= 2022 Colorado wildfires =

Natural disasters in the USA

Statistics
- Total fires: 8,370
- Total area: 56,403 acres (22,825 ha)

Impacts
- Deaths: 3
- Injuries: 6
- Structures lost: 1,084
- Cost: Unknown

The 2022 Colorado wildfire season was a series of wildfires that burned throughout the U.S. state of Colorado.

== Background ==
While "fire season" varies every year based on different weather conditions, most wildfires occur between May and September with a fire risk year-round with an increasing danger during winter. Drought and decreasing snowpack levels and lowering snowmelt and runoff increase fire risk. These conditions, along with increased temperatures and decreased humidity, are becoming more common from climate change. Vegetation growth provides an ample fuel for fires. From 2011 to 2020, Colorado experiences an average of 5,618 wildfires each year that collectively burn about 237,500 acres (96,100 ha).

== List of wildfires ==
The following is a list of fires that burned more than 1,000 acres (400 ha), or produced significant structural damage or casualties.

Name	County	Acres	Start date	Containment date (Note: Containment means that fire crews have established and secured control lines around the fire's perimeter. These lines are artificial barriers, like trenches or cleared vegetation, designed to stop the fire's spread, or natural barriers like rivers. Containment reflects progress in managing the fire but does not necessarily mean the fire is starved of fuel, under control, or put out.)	Notes	Ref
Marshall	Boulder	6,200	December 30, 2021	January 1, 2022	Unknown cause. Killed two and destroyed 1,084 structures, becoming the most destructive fire in Colorado history. Started in 2021 but was contained in 2022.	
High Park	Teller	1,572	May 12, 2022	May 24, 2022	Unknown cause.	

== See also ==
- Colorado State Forest Service
- List of Colorado wildfires
- 2022 New Mexico wildfires
