= 2012 Colorado wildfires =

Wildfire season in Colorado, United States

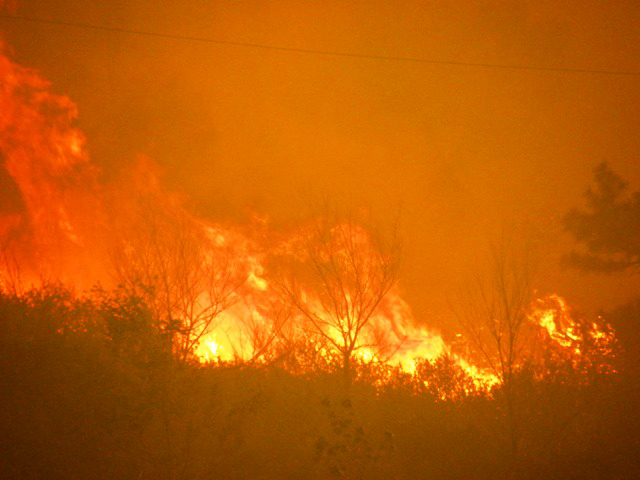

Statistics
- Total fires: 1,498
- Total area: 246,445 acres (997.33 km^{2})

Impacts
- Deaths: 6

The 2012 Colorado wildfires were an unusually devastating series of Colorado wildfires, including several separate fires that occurred throughout June, July, and August 2012. At least 34,500 residents were evacuated in June.

== Background ==
While "fire season" varies every year based on different weather conditions, most wildfires occur between May and September with a fire risk year-round with an increasing danger during winter. Drought and decreasing snowpack levels and lowering snowmelt and runoff increase fire risk. These conditions, along with increased temperatures and decreased humidity, are becoming more common from climate change. Vegetation growth provides an ample fuel for fires. From 2011 to 2020, Colorado experiences an average of 5,618 wildfires each year that collectively burn about 237,500 acres (96,100 ha).

== Causes ==
Conditions were favorable for the wildfires.

In 2011-2012, Colorado had an extremely dry winter, with only 13% of the average precipitation. The summer also saw temperatures near and in excess of 100 °F (38 °C) across the state, and most of the state had relative humidity in the teens and single digits. Dry thunderstorms and arsonists were also possible contributing factors, though the sources of some of the fires have not yet been determined.

== Fires ==
=== Little Sand Fire ===
Started May 13, this 22,400-acre fire was located in the San Juan National Forest north of the Piedra River near Pagosa Springs, Colorado.

=== Treasure fire ===
Starting June 21, 2012, the Treasure fire (also called New Treasure fire), a forest fire about five miles north of Leadville in Lake County, burned 420 acres on US Forest Service land, but did not threaten any homes or structures. As of July 2, 2012, the Treasure fire was reported to be 100 percent contained. The fire's cause remains unknown.

=== Weber fire ===
The Weber fire has burned over 10,000 acres just southeast of Mancos in Montezuma County. It started on Friday, June 22, 2012. The fire resulted in evacuation orders for 140 households and pre-evacuation orders for 390 more. All evacuation orders were lifted Monday morning, July 2. As of that date, the Weber fire is reported to be 75 percent contained. Officials are targeting Thursday, July 5 for full containment. The cause of the fire is still under investigation.

=== Waldo Canyon Fire ===
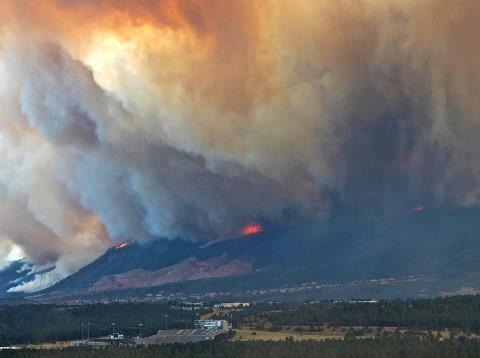
Waldo Canyon Fire

The Waldo Canyon Fire is a forest fire that started 10 miles (16 km) northwest of Colorado Springs on June 23, 2012, on July 8, 2012 the fire is 100 percent contained on 15,364 acres (24 sq mi; 62 km^{2}) of US Forest Service land. The fire has caused the evacuation of over 32,000 residents of Colorado Springs, Manitou Springs and Woodland Park, several small mountain communities along Highway 24, and partial evacuation of the United States Air Force Academy. On the afternoon of June 26, winds increased following a dry thunderstorm that passed west of the fire, within two hours the fire which had been held by firefighters near Rampart Road jumped northeast into Queens Canyon as the fire crested out of Queens Canyon gusts as high as 70 mph (110 km/h) pushed the fire down the front range particularly into the Mountain Shadows neighborhood. After 12 hours of fighting the blaze in western Colorado Springs the fire had claimed over 350 homes in Colorado Springs, thus making it the most destructive fire in Colorado state history by the number of houses burned.

=== Flagstaff fire ===
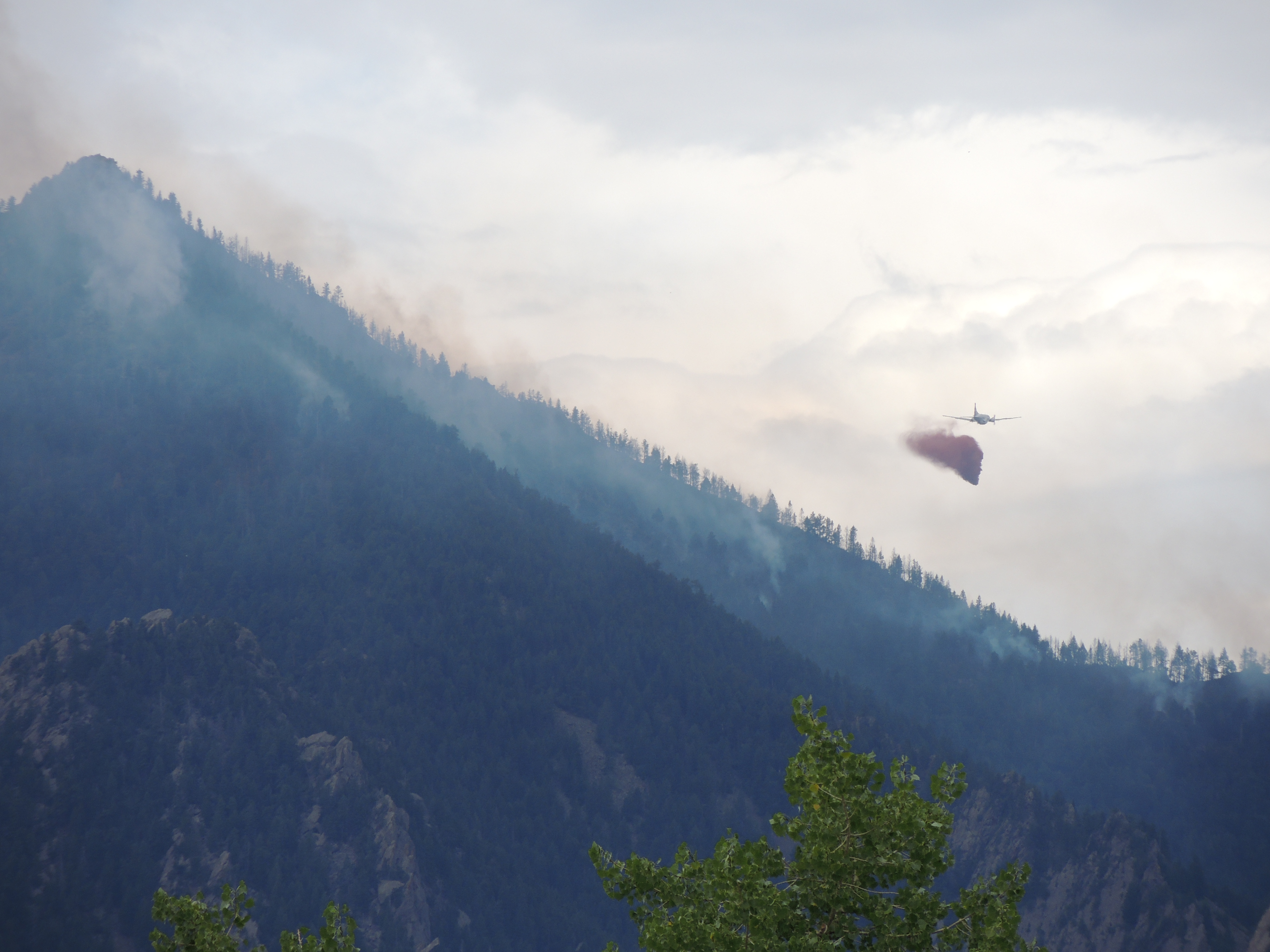
Firefighting aircraft dropping fire retardant on the Flagstaff fire

The Flagstaff fire (also called Bison fire) was forest fire located a few miles southwest of the city of Boulder in Boulder County. The fire was started by a lightning strike at 1:15 p.m., Mountain Daylight Time, on Tuesday, June 26, 2012, near the intersection of Flagstaff Road and Bison Drive, about three miles south of Flagstaff Mountain. Evacuation was ordered for 26 households in the Pine Needle Notch mountain subdivision. A pre-evacuation order was issued Tuesday evening, June 26, for 2400 households in southwestern Boulder proper. The pre-evacuation order was lifted late the next day, Wednesday, June 27.

The city of Boulder closed down a large part of the City of Boulder Mountain Parks to public use, specifically trails south of Chautauqua. On July 2, the city reopened the Mesa Trail and all trails east of the Mesa Trail to public use, although trails west of the Mesa Trail remained closed.

As of July 2, 2012, the Flagstaff fire was 90% contained and had burned about 300 acres.

=== Lower North Fork fire ===
In March, the 4,140 acre fire took the lives of three residents and destroyed 23 homes, one mile east of Foxton, Colorado. The Lower North Fork fire started on Monday, March 26. Preliminary reports indicate that the fire was caused by embers from a prescribed fire.

=== High Park fire ===
The High Park fire, a forest fire in the mountains west of Fort Collins in Larimer County, was caused by a lightning strike and was first detected on the morning of June 9, 2012. A 62-year-old woman was killed in the fire.

This fire burned over 87,250 acres (136 sq mi; 353 km^{2}), making it the second-largest fire in recorded Colorado history by area burned, after the Hayman Fire of 2002. It destroyed at least 259 homes, surpassing the number consumed by the Fourmile Canyon fire of 2010. The High Park fire was the most destructive fire in Colorado history, in terms of the number of houses burned, until it was surpassed by the Waldo Canyon fire.

The High Park fire was declared 100 percent contained on June 30, 2012, and all related evacuation orders were ended.

=== Springer fire ===
Reported June 17, 2012, the Springer fire, in Eleven Mile Canyon south of Lake George, burned over 1,100 acres. Over 500 firefighters fought the fire. As the fire was brought under control on Sunday, June 24, 2012, resources were pulled from it to fight the Waldo Canyon fire.

=== Woodland Heights fire ===
On June 23, 2012, the Woodland Heights fire in Estes Park, Colorado was started by a power line rubbing against a pine tree. The fire spread to 27.3 acres, burning 22 houses and two outbuildings in the Rocky Mountain National Park. The fire was contained over the weekend, and residents were allowed to return to the area the following Monday afternoon, June 25, 2012. Estes Valley Fire Protection District's proactive response, along with the extra resources afforded by a cost-sharing agreement with Larimer County, were credited with preventing the fire spreading into a major disaster on the scale of some of the year's other wildfires in the state, EVFPD board president Sue Doylen calling it one of the wildfire season's success stories.

=== Last Chance Fire ===
Starting Monday, June 25, 2012, this grassland fire, in and near the small towns of Last Chance and Woodrow in Washington County, burned over 45,000 acres, making it the second largest wildfire by acreage in Colorado in the year 2012 to date, after the High Park fire. Although this fire burned a very sparsely populated area, nonetheless at least 11 structures were lost, including four houses. The fire was declared fully contained on Tuesday evening, June 26. Cause of this fire is thought to be sparks thrown up from an automobile wheel following a tire blowout.

=== Ironing Board fire ===
The Ironing Board fire was a short-lived forest fire, started by a lightning strike on Thursday, June 28, 2012 in the City of Boulder Mountain Parks adjacent to the Third Flatiron. The fire was extinguished the next day. Although small, this fire was even closer to the city of Boulder than the Flagstaff fire. The sighting of this forest fire on the heels of the Flagstaff fire provoked numerous reports from the public.

=== Pine Ridge fire ===
The Pine Ridge fire was a large wildfire caused by a lightning strike that was detected in the rugged Little Bookcliffs area at 1:57 pm, MDT, on Wednesday, June 27, 2012 ten miles northeast of Grand Junction in Mesa County, Colorado. The fire started at a generally small size of twenty acres and rapidly grew uncontrollably due to the low humidity and high temperatures. As of Wednesday, July 4, 2012, officials say that the fire had burned an estimated 13,920 acres and have contained 100% of the fire. This was the first major fire of 2012 on the Western Slope. The cost to fight the fire was at an estimated $2.4 million.

=== Wetmore fire ===
On Tuesday, October 23, a wildfire was reported around 1:30 pm about a quarter mile south of Wetmore, Colorado. Winds blowing as fast as 50 miles per hour fanned the flames which grew to 970 acres within hours. Due to dangerous gusts, all firefighting aircraft were grounded. Greenwood and other nearby communities were evacuated, in which a total of 15 structures were destroyed. Over the next few days, the high winds subsided, allowing firefighters to achieve full containment on the fire by October 29. The blaze burned just under 2,000 acres and is believed to be human-caused.

=== Fern Lake fire ===
An illegal campfire sparked the Fern Lake fire in Rocky Mountain National Park on Tuesday, October 9. Due to steep and inaccessible terrain, firefighters could only monitor the fire. It smoldered throughout October and November; slowly reaching over 1,500 acres and 40% containment. On December 1, wind speeds increased to as high as 75 miles per hour and pushed the fire east three miles into Moraine Park, where an unoccupied cabin was destroyed and over 580 homes were evacuated. A snowstorm later that month halted the fire at 3,500 acres, but smoke was still visible until January 7, 2013.

== See also ==
- 2012 North American drought
- Summer 2012 North American heat wave
