= Marshall Fire =

Fire in Boulder County, Colorado, in 2021

- Part of the 2021 Colorado wildfires and 2022 Colorado wildfires
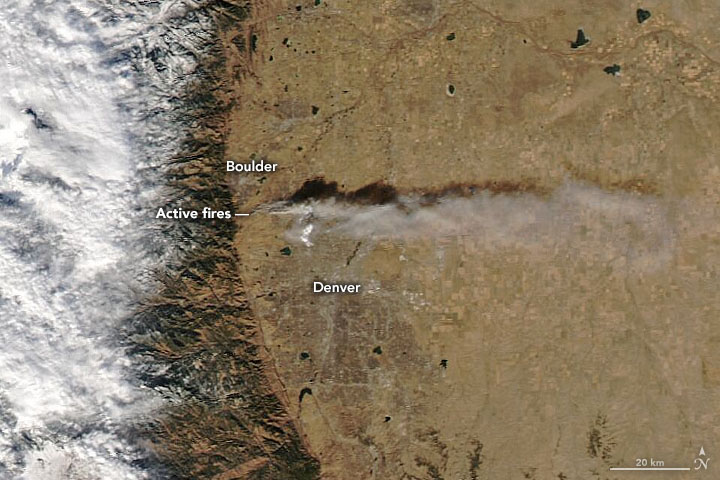
- Satellite view of the wildfire near Boulder, Colorado, quickly spreading into nearby homes
- Date: December 30, 2021 –; January 1, 2022; (3 days)
- Location: Boulder County, Colorado, United States
- Coordinates: 40.09°N 105.36°W

Statistics
- Burned area: 6,026 acres (2,439 ha)

Impacts
- Deaths: 2
- Injuries: 6+
- Structures lost: 1,084
- Cost: >$2 billion

The Marshall Fire was a destructive wildfire and urban conflagration that started on December 30, 2021, shortly after 11:00 a.m. MST, as a grass fire in Boulder County, Colorado. The fire caused the evacuation of 37,500 people, killed two people, and destroyed more than 1,000 structures to become the most destructive fire in Colorado history. It began in two places and was neither caused by criminal negligence nor arson.

== Ignition and Progression ==
=== Background ===
An unusually wet spring with above average growth of grass due to moist conditions, followed by an unusually warm and dry summer and fall, created abundant dry grass. This, combined with the lack of snow so far that winter, created ideal weather conditions for wildfires.

Additionally, high winds were recorded in the area, with gusts of up to 115 miles per hour (185 km/h). The winds were driven by the mountain wave effect, and allowed for rapid spread of the fire. Effects of the high winds were also observed on the University of Colorado Boulder campus, where downed branches and trees were reported.

=== Cause ===
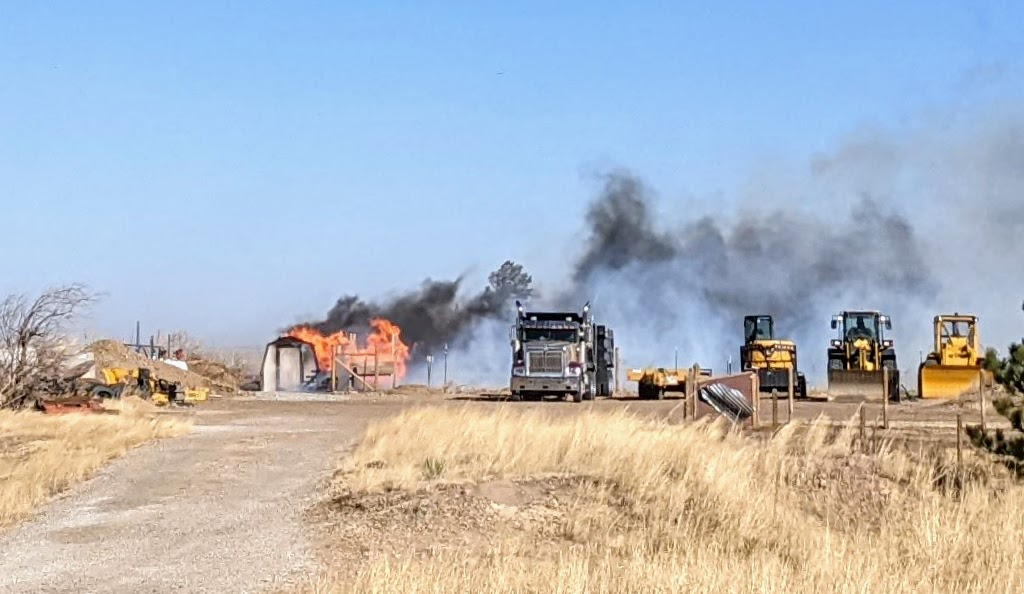
The fire at 11:46

In June 2023, Boulder County Sheriff Curtis Johnson announced that the fire's causes had been found. He said that the fire was caused by two separate occurrences: "week-old embers on Twelve Tribes property and a sparking Xcel Energy power line," adding that negligence and intent had been ruled out and no criminal charges were expected. This determination came after a lengthy investigation in which multiple alternatives were considered. The possibility of drift mines causing the fire was ruled out. Xcel Energy has faced more than 200 lawsuits filed by victims of the fire.

=== Progression ===
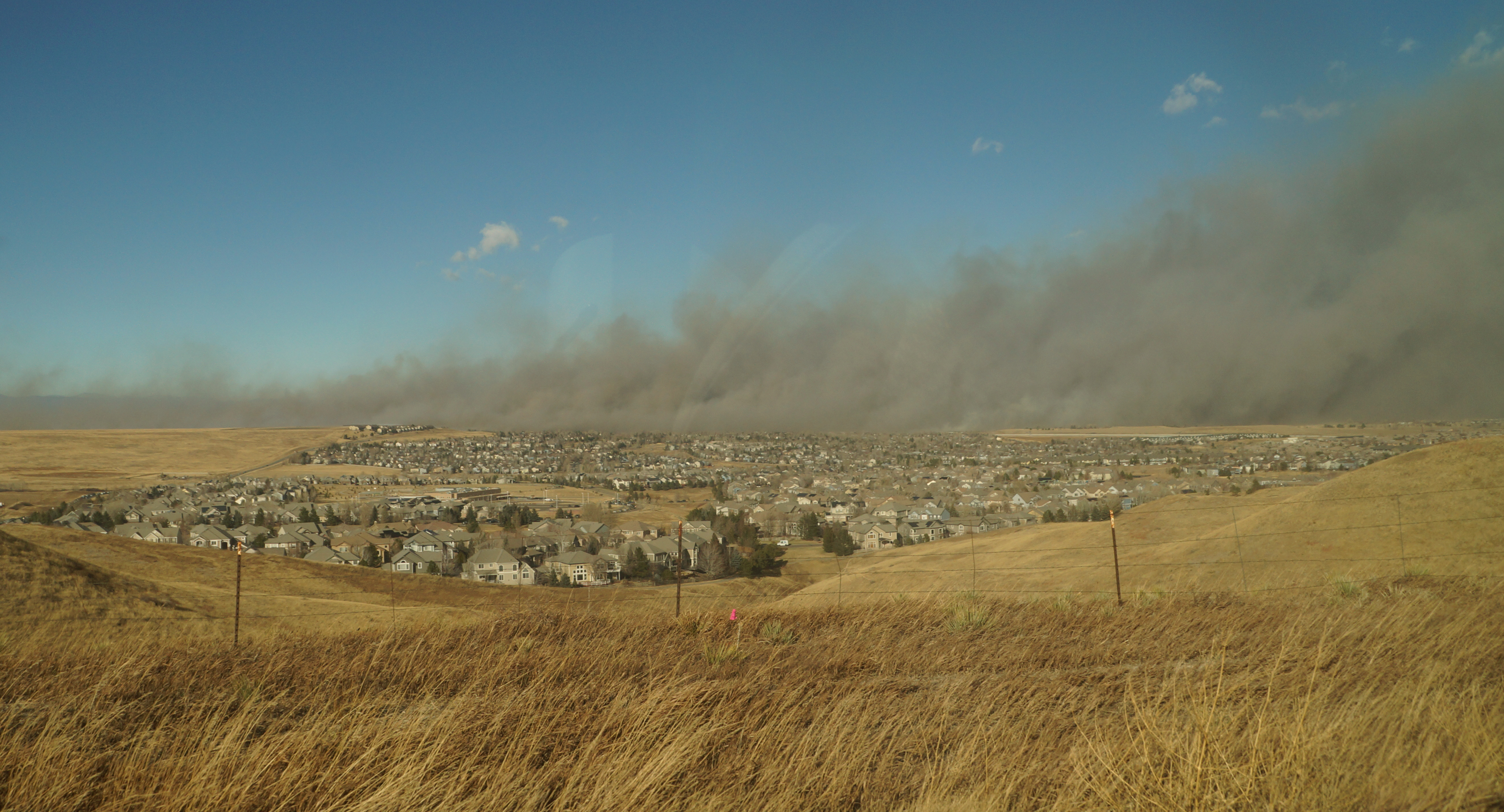
Large plumes of smoke are visible over Superior around 2:00 PM MST on December 30. View from State Highway 128, looking north.

The Marshall Fire was first reported to 911 on 30 December 2021 at the intersection of Colorado 93 and Marshall Road at 11:09 a.m. The first firefighting unit, Mountain View Fire and Rescue engine 2209, arrived on scene at 11:12 a.m. Boulder Open Space Ranger 5077 was already there. No fire was evident when they arrived, but a low hanging wire obstructed Marshall Road. Together, they closed Marshall Road. Then seeing smoke, Engine 2209 moved south along a dirt road and discovered a small grass fire at 11:21 a.m. Once the fire location was identified by the unit, high winds started to rapidly spread the fire. Three minutes after finding the fire, it was determined out of control and additional units were called to assist. At 11:44 a.m. the commander on site ordered the evacuation of residents two miles (3.2 km) downwind of the fire. By noon the fire had reached the town of Superior, three miles (4.8 km) to the east, prompting the evacuation of stores there. Within another hour evacuations had been ordered for tens of thousands of people starting with the town of Superior and later the cities of Louisville, portions of Broomfield, and unincorporated Boulder County. Other portions of Broomfield, along with portions of Lafayette, Arvada, and Westminster were issued pre-evacuation orders.

Wind gusts of 115 miles per hour (185 km/h) were reported, and the fire extent was an estimated 1,600 acres (650 ha) by 5:00 p.m. and had increased to 6,200 acres (2,500 ha) by 10:00 a.m. on December 31.

On the night of December 31–January 1, heavy snowfall put an end to the fire.

== Effects ==
In response to the fires, Governor Jared Polis declared a state of emergency around 3:15 p.m. on the day of the outbreak and ordered a ground delay at Denver International Airport. U.S. president Joe Biden responded to the fire by permitting the Federal Emergency Management Agency to assist. For those affected by the fires, Colorado Chamber President and CEO Loren Furman announced that the Colorado Chamber was united to help members and all local businesses and residents impacted by the fire. The Northwest Chamber Alliance created a website that centralized resources for businesses for federal and state aid, local resources, and donation information.

=== Casualties ===
Eight burn injuries were confirmed in Boulder County. Two people were killed. Over 1,000 pets are estimated to have perished, as well as two horses, two goats and nine cows. Even though much of the land burned was grazing land, rescuers saved hundreds of other livestock.

=== Evacuations and closures ===
Over 37,500 residents, employees and shoppers safely evacuated. Ten evacuation notices were posted by Boulder County during the event. The results from a questionnaire study indicate that almost 70% of the householders in the area decided to evacuate. The Colorado Department of Transportation closed multiple lanes and roadways as a result of crashes and the fires themselves; U.S. Route 36 was closed in both directions from Boulder to Broomfield and a portion of Colorado State Highway 470 was closed entirely near Morrison. Safety warnings were also issued for travelers on a stretch of Interstate 70 between Golden and Georgetown and Colorado State Highway 93 was temporarily closed for 40 minutes in the late morning.

=== Damage ===
An estimated 1,084 structures, including houses, a hotel and at least one shopping center, burned as a result of the Marshall Fire, and another 149 were damaged. Less than 12 hours after igniting, the fire surpassed the 2013 Black Forest Fire as the state's most destructive in terms of structures lost. Later estimates place the total damage surpassing $2 billion.

=== Public drinking water systems ===
The fire damaged six public drinking water systems in the area. A case study was developed to better understand decisions, resources, expertise, and response limitations during and after the wildfire. The fire caused all water systems to lose power and was sometimes coupled with structure destruction, distribution depressurization, and the failure of backup power systems. These consequences jeopardized fire-fighting support and allowed for contamination of water distribution systems. Staff decontaminated and restored services, with actions taken to improve response to future events.

== Long-term effects ==
The Marshall Fire exposed people to dangerous airborne compounds through ash and smoke. A research paper published in 2025 reported that people living near the burned areas self-reported a heightened frequency of headaches, sore throats, and coughs compared to control populations. Another research paper investigated a single-family residence affected by the wildfire smoke and showed that Volatile Organic Compounds originating from the wildfire remained in the home for several weeks, longer than expected.

== Gallery ==
Media related to Marshall Fire at Wikimedia Commons

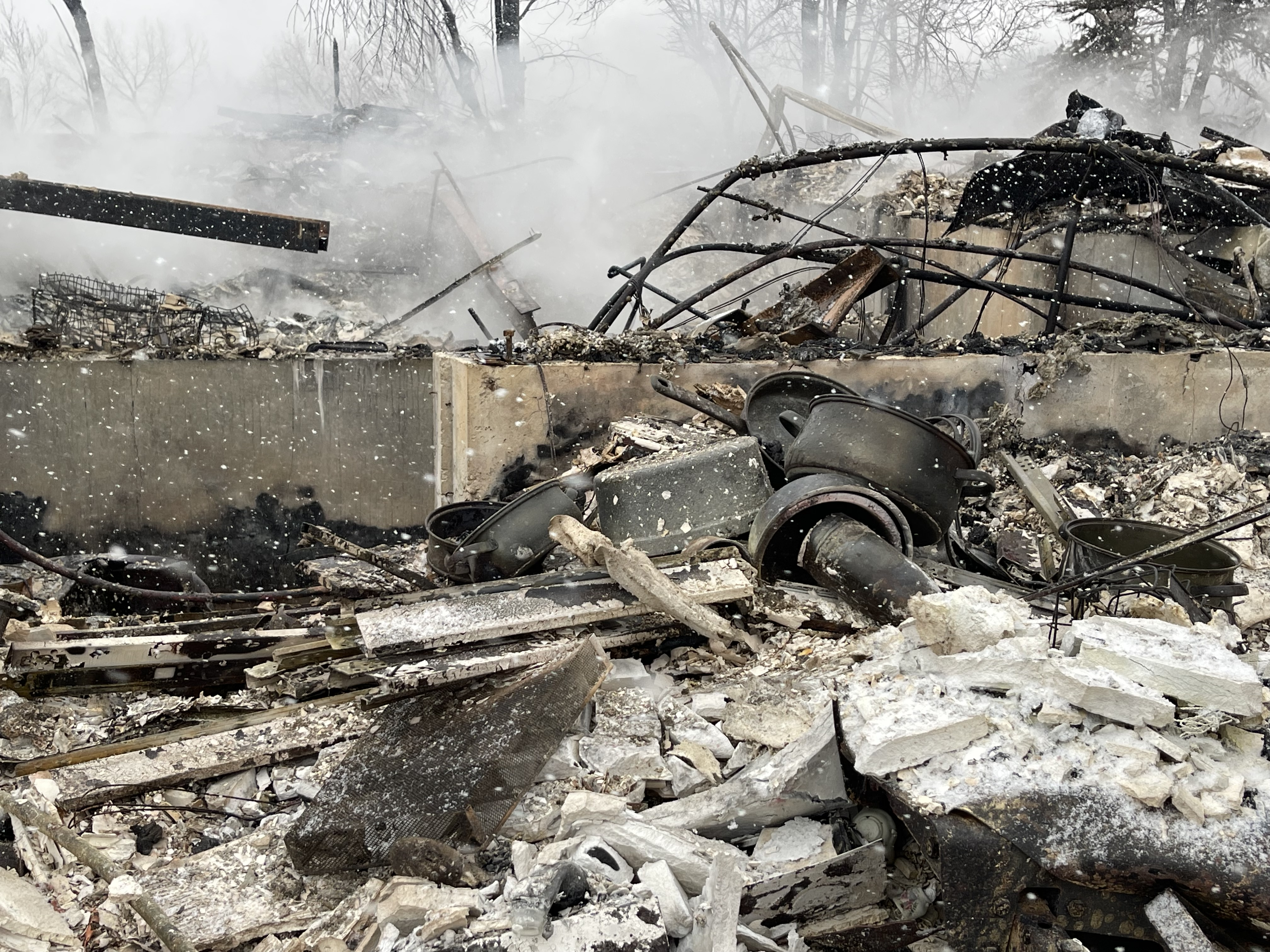
Pots and pans seen in the remains of a home burned from the fire the night after.

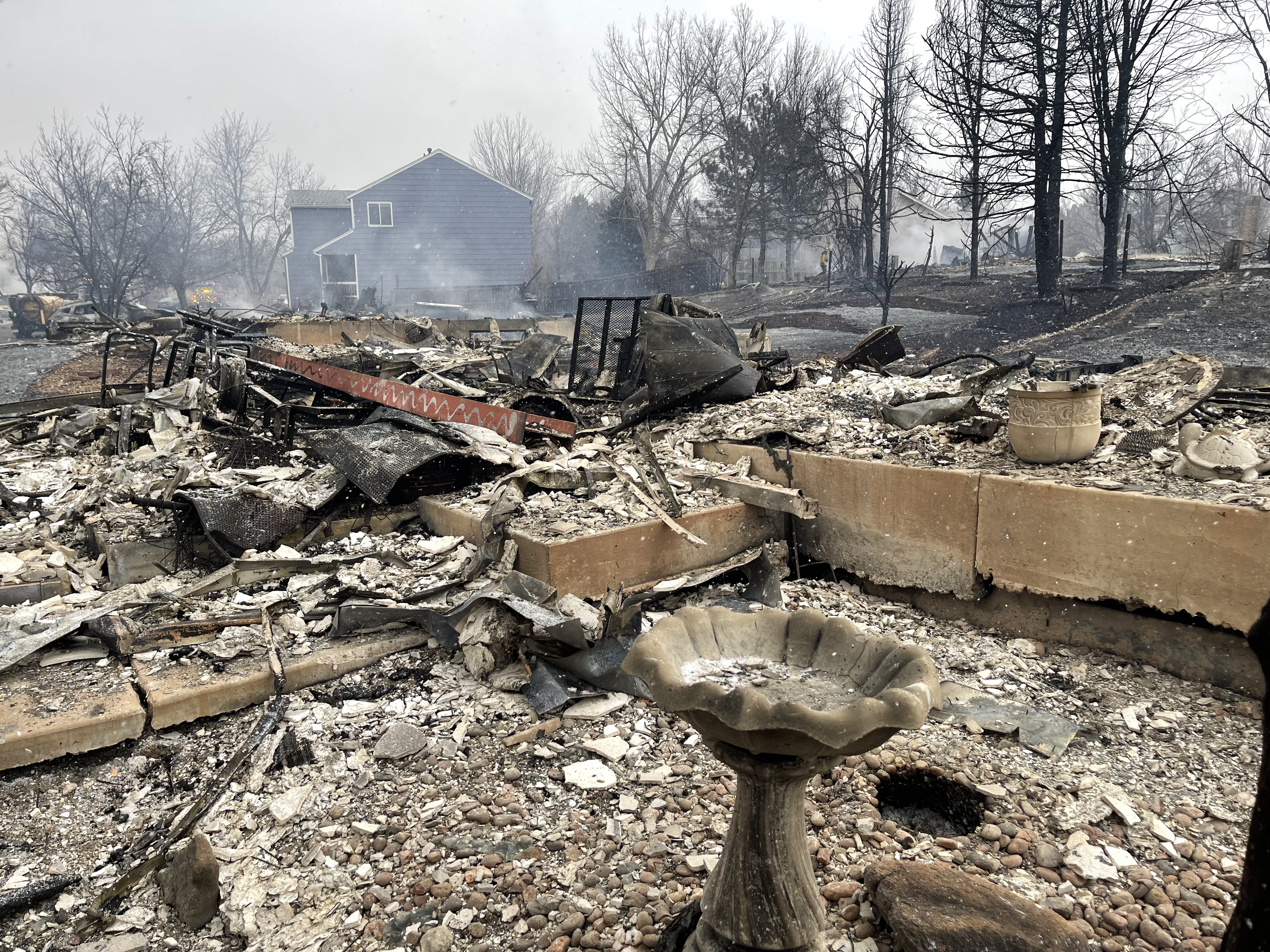
Front porch of a home burned by the fire.

== See also ==
- Weather of 2021
  - 2021 Colorado wildfires
- Weather of 2022
  - 2022 Colorado wildfires
- Black Forest fire, previously was the most destructive fire in Colorado history
