= Black Forest Fire =

2013 Wildfire in Colorado, United States

- Part of the 2013 Colorado wildfires
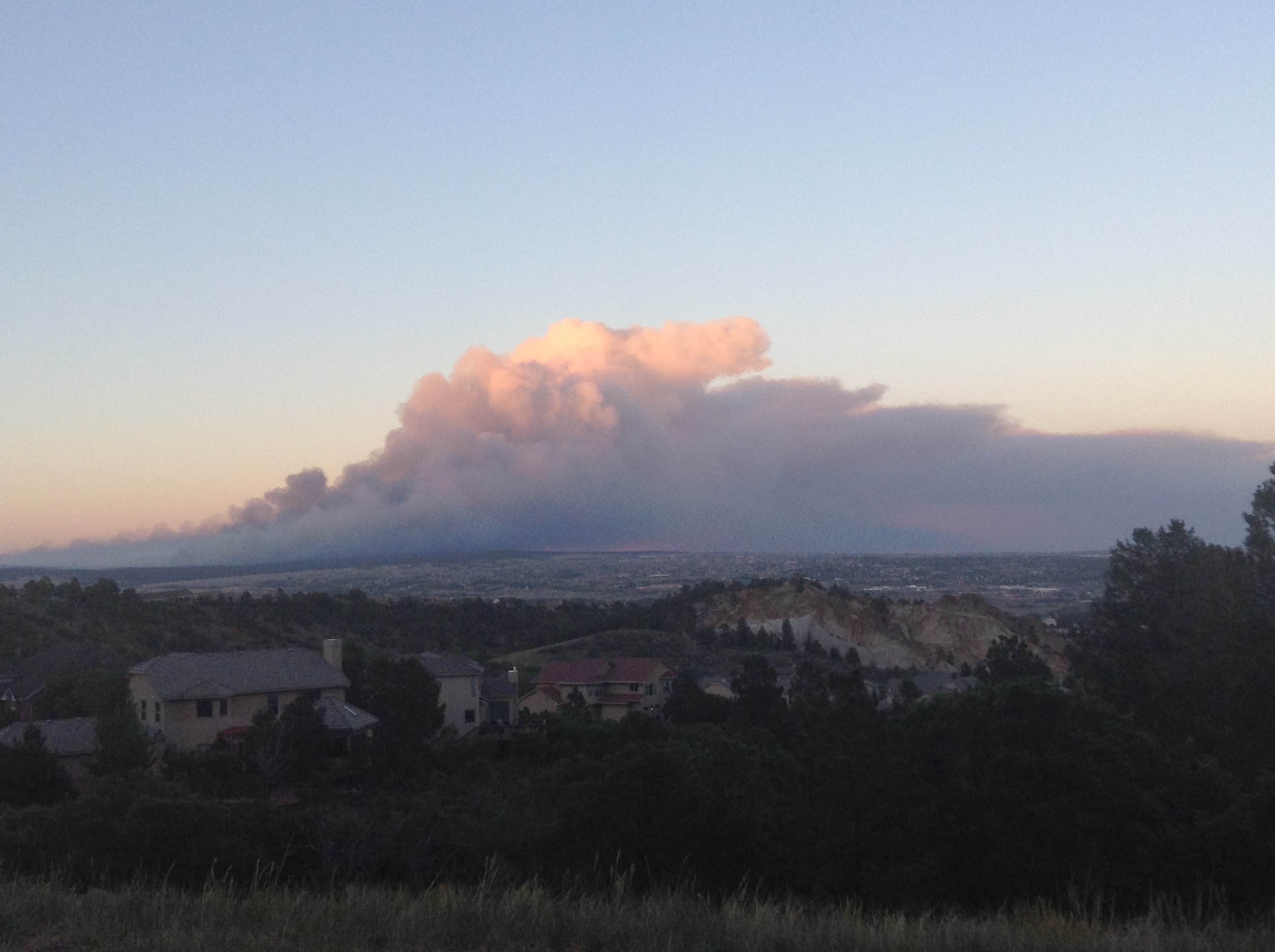
- The smoke plume rising from the Black Forest area on June 11, 2013, the first day of the fire.
- Date: June 11, 2013 – June 20, 2013
- Location: Black Forest, Colorado, Colorado Springs, Colorado
- Coordinates: 39.016°N 104.75°W

Statistics
- Burned area: 14,280 acres (58 km^{2})

Impacts
- Deaths: 2
- Structures destroyed: 511 homes

Map
- Location within Colorado

Smoke clouds caused by fires in Black Forest

Burning forest land

Smoke of the fire

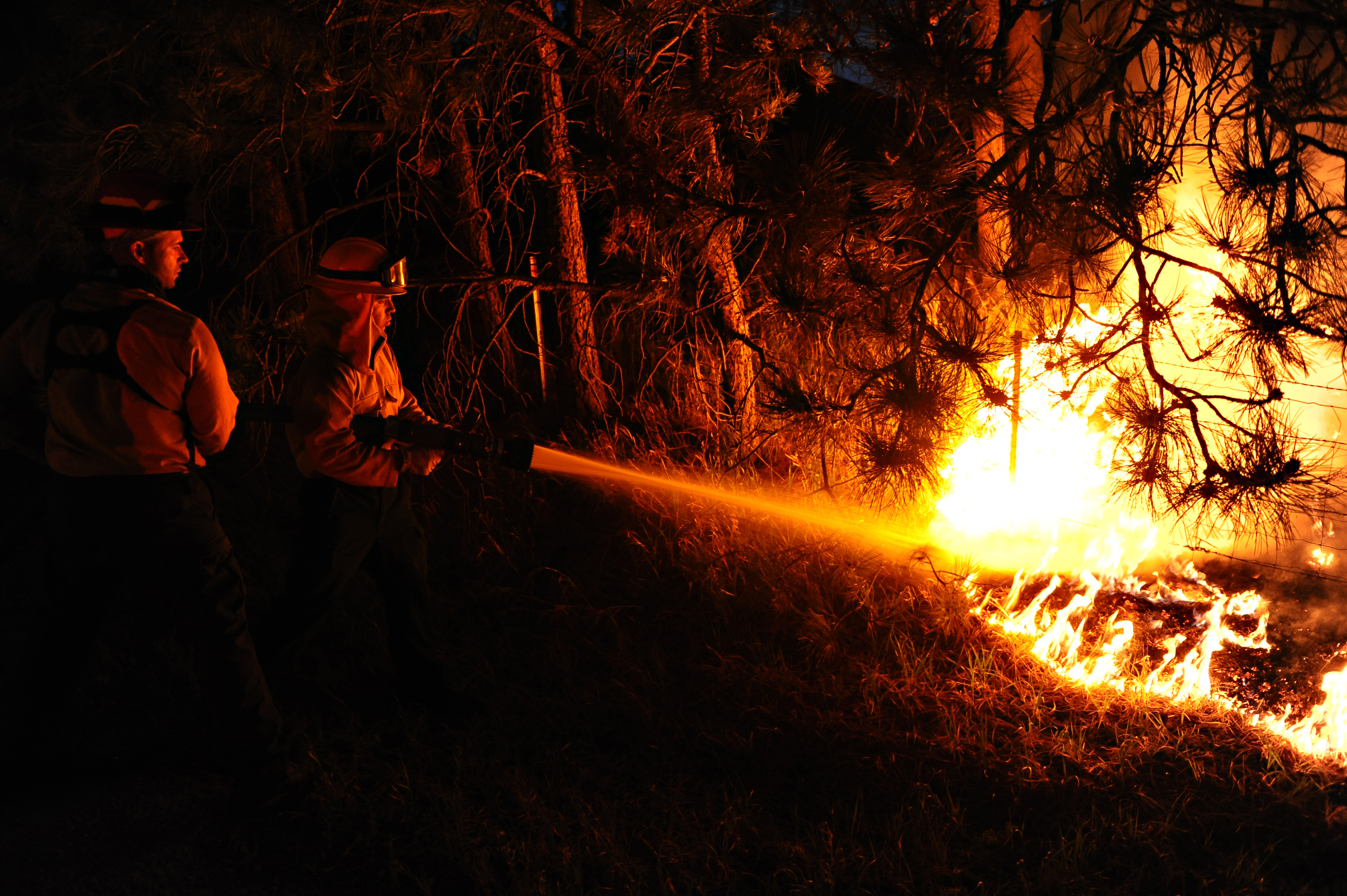
U.S. Air Force Academy firefighters fight the fire

UH-60 Black Hawk helicopter picks up water for a water drop

A U.S. Air Force modular airborne fire fighting system-equipped C-130 Hercules aircraft assigned to the 302nd Airlift Wing releases a fire-retardant solution to help stop the spreading of fires

A U.S. Air Force C-130 Hercules aircraft with the 302nd Airlift Wing helps put out wildfires with a Modular Airborne Firefighting System

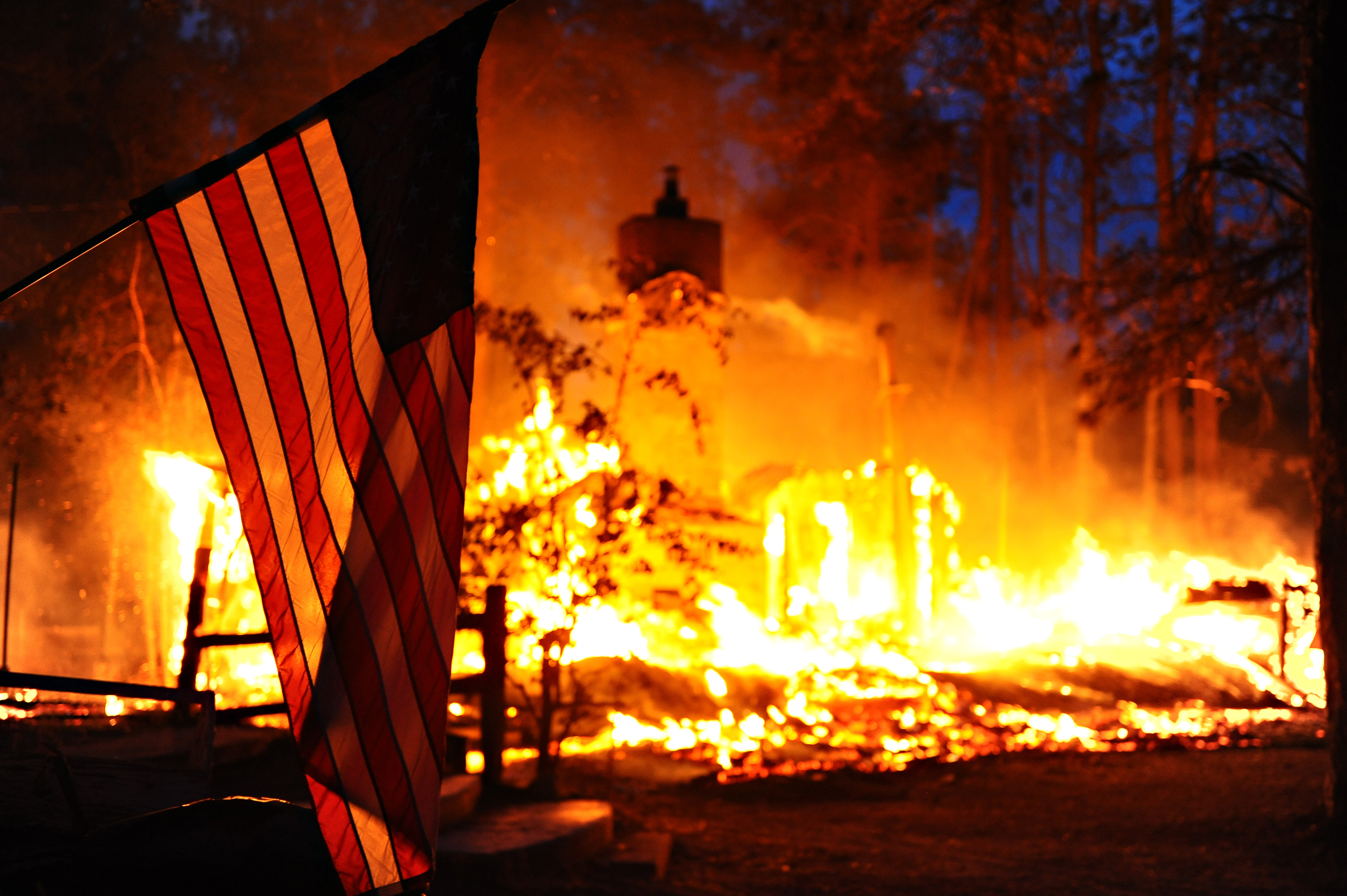
A U.S. flag hangs in front of a burning structure in Black Forest, Colorado

Black Forest Fire incident command center

A burnt section of forest land as a result of the fire

The Black Forest Fire was a forest fire that began near Highway 83 and Shoup Road in Black Forest, Colorado around 1:00 p.m. on June 11, 2013. As of June 20, 2013, after the fire was 100 percent contained, 14,280 acres (22.31 sq mi; 57.8 km^{2}) were burned, at least 509 homes were destroyed, and two people were killed. This was the most destructive fire in the state's history at the time, surpassing the 2012 Waldo Canyon Fire, which also began near Colorado Springs. It was surpassed in 2021, when the Marshall Fire destroyed over 1,000 homes in Boulder County, in Superior and Louisville.

The evacuation area covered 94,000 acres (147 sq mi; 380 km^{2}), 13,000 homes, and 38,000 people. Three shelters were established in the area, including the Elbert County Fairgrounds, which accepted humans, pets, and large animals. Two other shelters were designated for large animals only.

On June 13, the Denver Post reported 457 firefighters were working the fireline, including agencies around the fire, the Colorado Air National Guard, and select personnel from fire suppression teams at Fort Carson and the nearby United States Air Force Academy. Of note, 3 UH-60s and 3 CH-47 from 2-4 GSAB, along with some crews from 3-4 AHB (4th Combat Aviation Brigade) were instrumental in providing an immediate response to assist in fighting the fires. The Battalion, commanded by LTC Tyler Smith, launched with very little notice to provide much-needed support to the Front Range region. One of the CH-47D aircraft was involved in the effort on every day. U.S. Northern Command assisted with firefighting efforts.

== Background and ignition ==
Record setting heat in the region and a red flag warning from the National Weather Service set the stage for a dangerous fire situation. In the early afternoon hours of Tuesday, June 11, 2013, beginning before 2:00 p.m. MDT, reports of a wildfire in the Black Forest area reached 9-1-1 dispatchers. The record heat and high winds quickly spread the flames to several hundred acres.

The National Weather Service in Pueblo, Colorado issued notices for severe fire weather starting at 2:00 p.m. on June 12, with low humidity, high winds, and temperatures approaching 90 °F (32 °C) expected to drive the fire. In the afternoon hours of June 12, the fire exploded in size, driven by dry winds, jumping fire lines, and spreading out to the east, north, and west. Evacuation areas were expanded from El Paso County into Douglas and Elbert Counties, and west to Interstate 25. Some evacuation shelters were forced to evacuate due to smoke.

Firefighters experienced additional frustrations with violations of road closures on Highway 83, Walker Road, and Evans Road, according to scanner traffic observed by The Gazette. Also observed by reporters over the scanner were instances of news media helicopters violating closed airspace above the fire.

Fire investigators confirmed that lightning had been ruled out as a cause of the fire.

== Destruction ==
Within two days of ignition, the Black Forest fire surpassed the previous year's Waldo Canyon fire as the most destructive fire in Colorado history. El Paso County Sheriff Terry Maketa stated that at least 360 homes had been lost and 15,000 acres had burned as of the June 13 morning briefing. It was also released that 38,000 residents had been evacuated from 13,000 homes. The National Weather Service predicted a third day of hot, dry, windy weather for the fire area, especially in late afternoon. Isolated thunderstorms were expected.

By 5:00 p.m., the fire was five percent contained, while the acreage of the fire increased to 15,700 acres (24.5 sq mi; 64 km^{2}). The bodies of two victims, a married couple, Marc Allen Herklotz, 52, and Robin Lauran Herklotz, 50, who appeared to have died while attempting to evacuate their home, were discovered. They were next to a car with its doors open and the trunk packed full of belongings in the garage of a home that the blaze had leveled.

Maketa announced on Friday morning that 19 more homes burned, totaling 379 and in the evening his office further updated this number to 419. On June 15, the sheriff's office further updated the number to 473. On June 16, the Sheriff's office released new data on the number of homes affected: 3,633 unaffected, 483 total loss, and 17 with partial damage. Due to lessons learned from the Waldo Canyon Fire, a publicly accessible list of affected homes was published by the Sheriff's office and updated on a regular basis, using the same web address to reflect ongoing updates to this data in real time.

On June 16, the Denver Post reported the area burned was downgraded from 15,000 to 14,198 acres due to more accurate mapping.

On June 22, the number of homes lost was reported at 511.

== Containment ==
Firefighters were able to make some important gains the evening of Sunday, June 14, when some cloud cover and rain moved into the area, bringing containment to 30 percent that night. By the evening of June 15, KOAA reported the fire as 55 percent contained. On June 16, the Denver Post reported the fire was 65 percent contained. In an interview at noon on June 20, Sheriff Maketa announced 100 percent containment was expected by that night.

== Residents return ==
As of 10:00 a.m. On Thursday, June 20, the Sheriff's office allowed residents to return to most of the burn area, though a small area including Darr Circle, Falcon Drive, Peregrine Way and the adjacent section of Shoup Road continued to be closed to residents and the public due to an ongoing crime scene investigation.

Residents were allowed to reenter their property as of that morning; the area would not be opened to the general public until Saturday.

== Aftermath ==
As of Sunday, June 21, the fire was completely contained, but the total number of homes lost had risen to 509, and Sheriff Maketa stated that the assessed value of the lost homes totaled about $90 million. The number was revised upward the next day to 511 homes lost. As of June 20, 2013, the cost for fighting the fire was estimated at $9,323,955.

At the completion of the first of four parts of the Black Forest assessment in early July, the El Paso County Assessor's office reported that the fire destroyed 486 homes — fewer than the sheriff's department's initial estimate of 511 — and damaged 37, causing $85,444,052 in damage.

Authorities continued to investigate the cause of the fire. The sheriff's office, which said the fire's cause was not natural, executed search warrants and conducted interviews.

== See also ==
- 2013 Colorado wildfires
  - Royal Gorge fire, another fire in Colorado that started on the same day
- Waldo Canyon fire, previously the most destructive wildfire in Colorado history
- Marshall Fire, most destructive wildfire in Colorado history
