= West Fork Complex =

2013 wildfire complex in Colorado

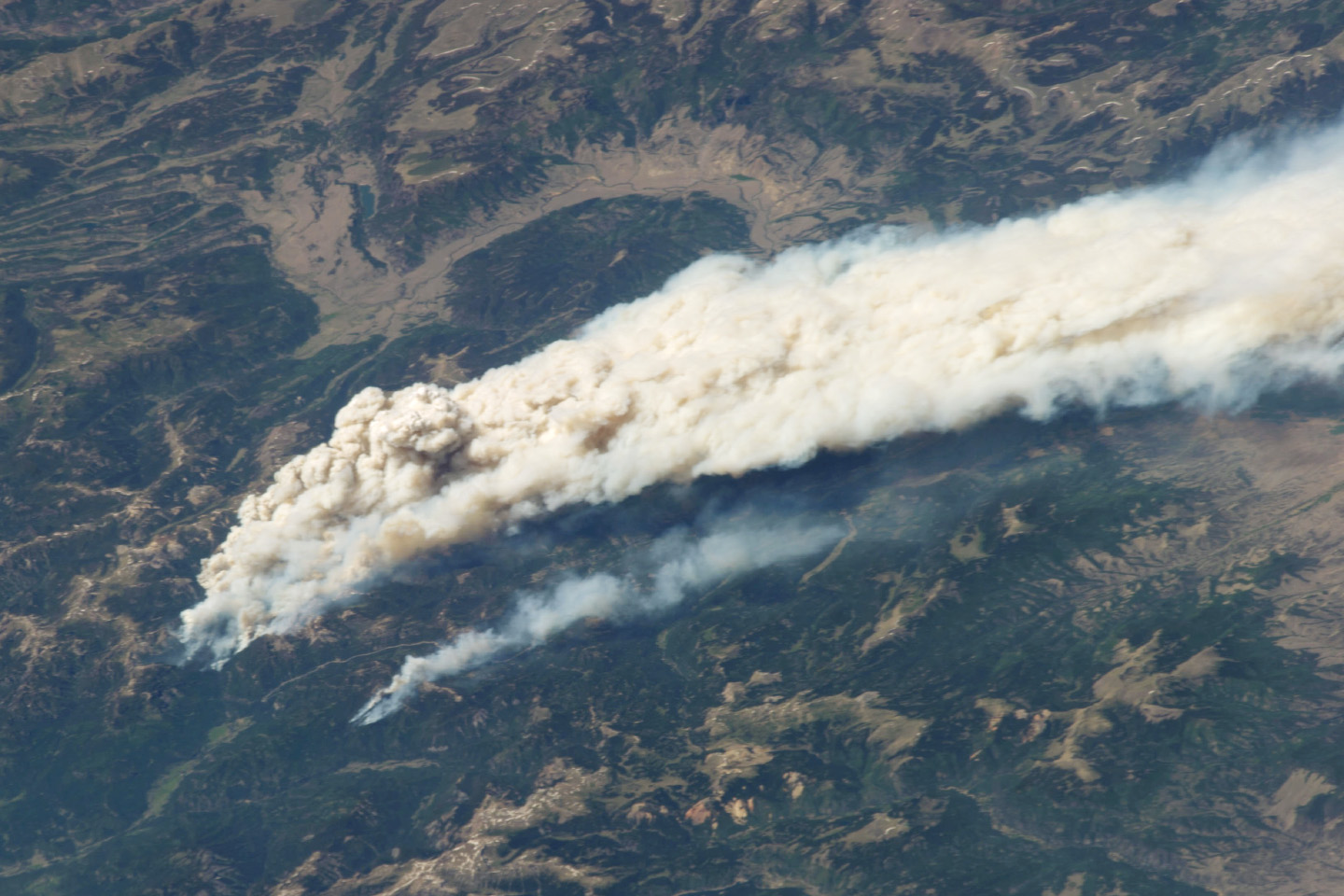
- Southern Colorado, United States
- Date: June 5, 2013 – November 13, 2013
- Coordinates: 37.373431°N 107.002931°W

Statistics
- Burned area: 109,615 acres (444 km^{2})

Ignition
- Cause: Lightning

Map
- Location within Colorado

The West Fork Complex was a complex of wildfires near Wolf Creek Pass in southern Colorado. The first fire, the West Fork fire, was started by lightning at about 1 PM on June 5, 2013. All three fires were started by lightning. As the fire moved into heavy dead timber in early June, thousands of firefighters struggled to prevent movement of the fires into populated areas.

It was composed of the West Fork fire, northeast of Pagosa Springs, Colorado, south of Wagon Wheel Gap, and southwest of South Fork, Colorado; the Papoose fire south of Creede, Colorado; and the small Windy Pass fire, near the Wolf Creek ski area. As of the afternoon of July 8:

- Papoose: 49,056 acres (76.650 sq mi; 198.52 km^{2})
- West Fork Fire: 58,576 acres (91.525 sq mi; 237.05 km^{2})
- Windy Pass: 1,417 acres (2.214 sq mi; 5.73 km^{2})

Much of the complex was in the Weminuche Wilderness but has burned into surrounding areas in the San Juan and Rio Grande National Forests and private land. The fires, particularly the West Fork fire, burned in dead trees killed by the spruce beetle. Due to the intensity of the West Fork fire which for some days was burning in windy conditions no attempt was made to directly attack it. Aggressive, and so far successful, efforts were made to prevent the Windy Pass fire from reaching the ski area. South Fork and Wagon Wheel Gap were evacuated and U.S. Highway 160 and State Highway 149 were closed to the west of South Fork. Route 160 was reopened at 6 AM June 29; Route 149 was reopened June 30. Most personnel were engaged in structure protection efforts to the west of South Fork, on the low terrain near the Rio Grande River to the north of the fires, and at tourist facilities south of Creede. On the 19th of July when the last incident update was made the fires had a total area of 109,615 acres and were 66% contained with 43 personnel engaged in combating them; the fire was described as "smoldering." There are two incident command posts, one in Pagosa Springs, Colorado for the portion of the fire on the west side of the Continental Divide, the other in Del Norte, Colorado for the portion on the east side. As of July 8 the portion of the West Fork fire west of the Continental Divide remained at 0% containment while the portion east of the Continental Divide was 25%.

There was about .20 of an inch of precipitation on some parts of the fire June 30 due to a thunderstorm, but strong and erratic winds also stimulated the fire. On July 4, 2013 the fires were described as "creeping and smoldering" with fire suppression efforts being directed at preventing the expansion of the fire into heavy stands of dead and down fuel. Growth of the fire had continued on the southeastern side of the Papoose fire but as of July 8 widespread showers had moderated fire behavior. As of July 14 humidity was gradually increasing as the monsoon season approached with occasional thunderstorms expected and flash flood warnings issued for the area. As of July 19 precipitation had considerably dampened the fire, but smoldering and smoke continued. As of 2023, the West Complex fire is the 5th largest in Colorado state history. In 2020 3 fires larger than it burned more the 600,000 acres total pushing the West Fork complex down the list.

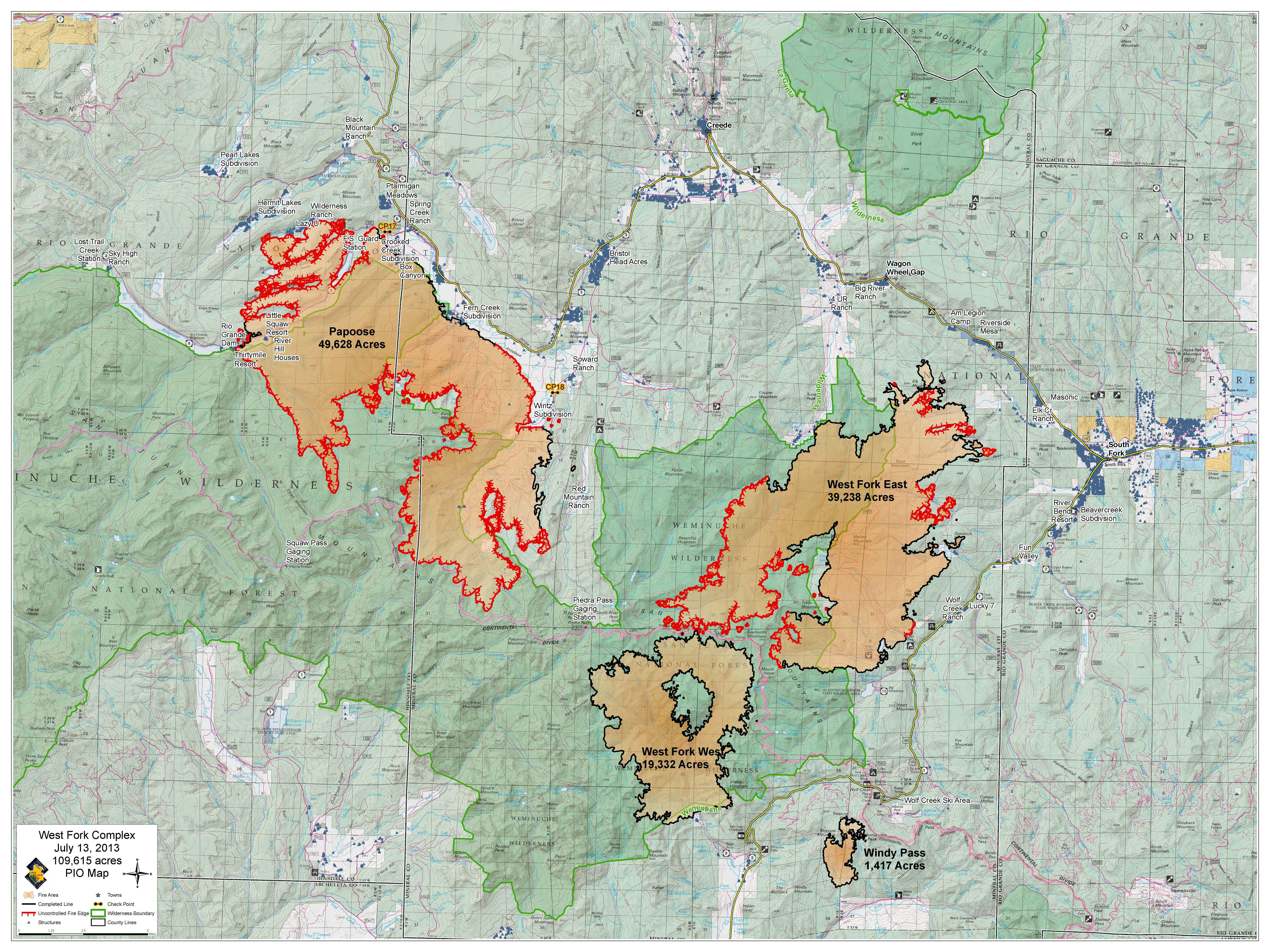
Final map of the West Fork Complex July 13, 2013

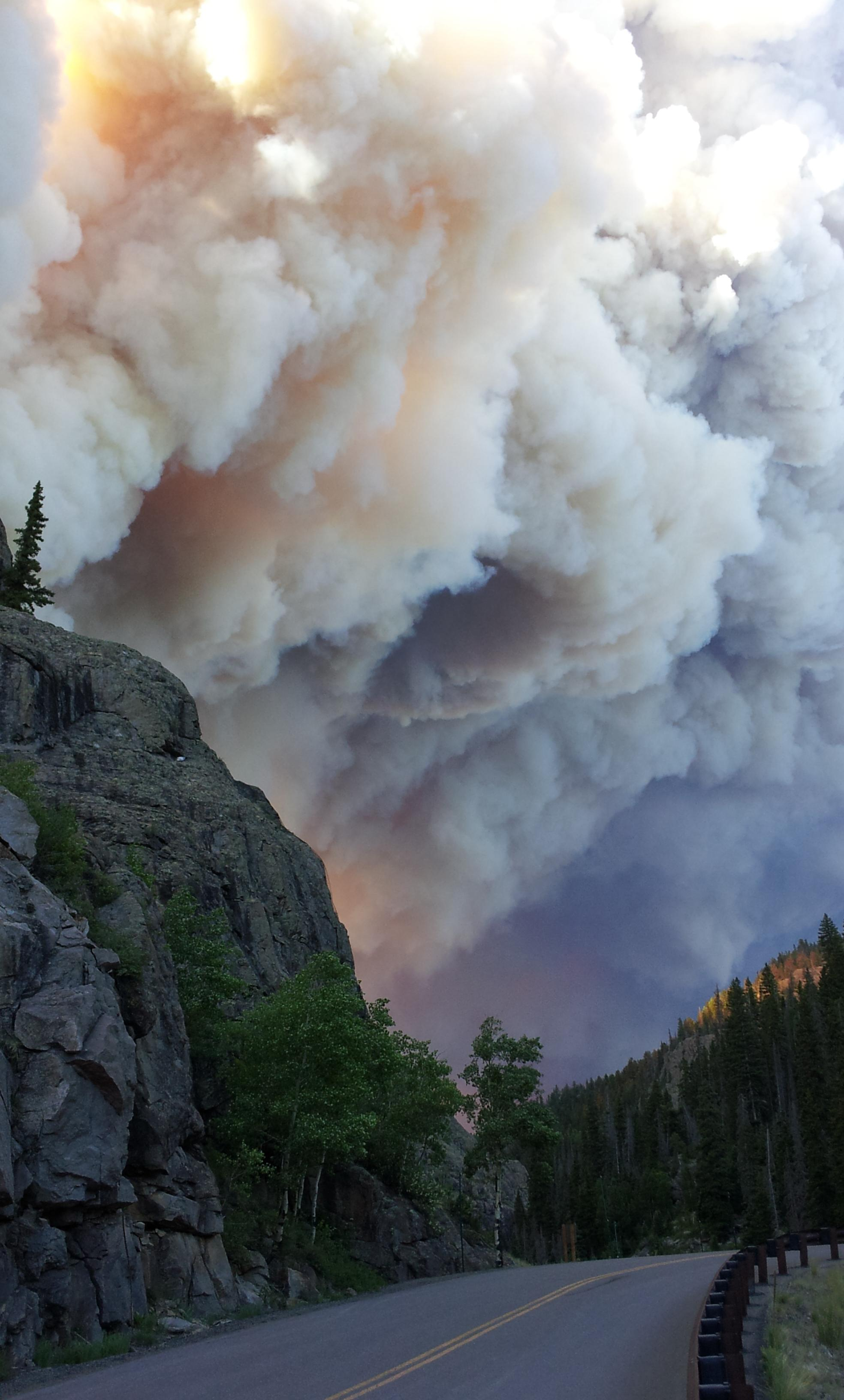
Smoke plume near Big Meadows Campground

== See also ==
- 2013 Colorado wildfires
- Pine Gulch Fire, 3rd largest wildfire in state history
- Cameron Peak Fire, the largest wildfire in state history
- Hayman Fire, 4th largest wildfire in state history
