= 2013 Colorado wildfires =

Wildfire season in Colorado, United States

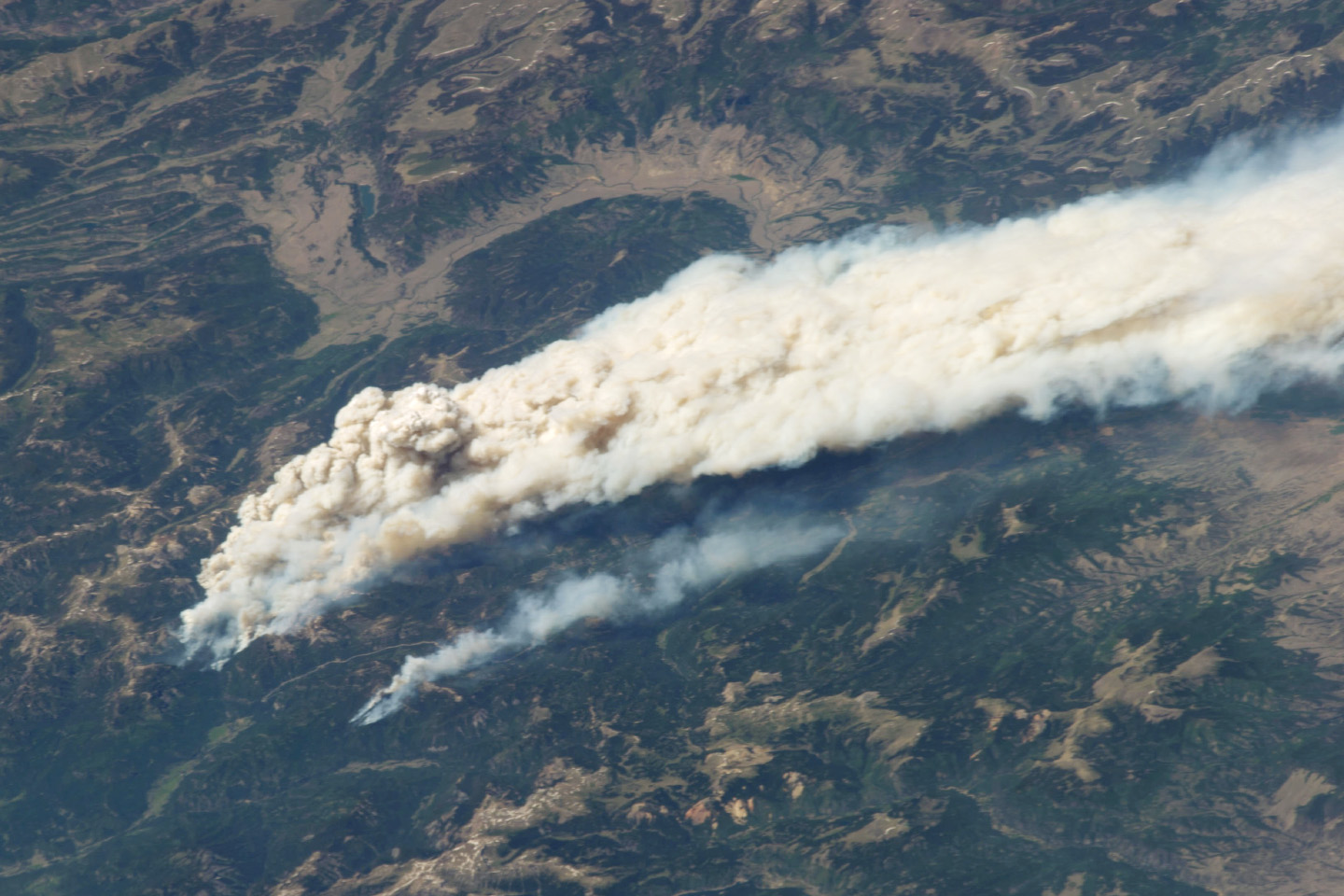
- The West Fork Complex fire viewed from aboard the International Space Station on June 19, 2013

Statistics
- Total fires: 1,176
- Total area: 195,145 acres (789.72 km^{2})

Impacts
- Deaths: 2

In the summer of 2013, there were several major wildfires in Colorado in the United States. During June and July, record high temperatures and dry conditions fueled the fires all across the state. By July 24, 570 structures had been destroyed and 2 people died. Below is a list of the major fires of the year.

External image
- Photo at TwitPic

== Background ==
While "fire season" varies every year based on different weather conditions, most wildfires occur between May and September with a fire risk year-round with an increasing danger during winter. Drought and decreasing snowpack levels and lowering snowmelt and runoff increase fire risk. These conditions, along with increased temperatures and decreased humidity, are becoming more common from climate change. Vegetation growth provides an ample fuel for fires. From 2011 to 2020, Colorado experiences an average of 5,618 wildfires each year that collectively burn about 237,500 acres (96,100 ha).

== West Fork Complex fire ==
The West Fork Complex Fire started on June 5, and consisted of three fires, all caused by lightning: the Windy Pass Fire, the West Fork Fire, and the Papoose Fire. The fire grew fast through pine beetle-killed trees, and threatened the town of South Fork only 0.5-mile (0.80 km) away. The fire burned only one structure, and reached 109,615 acres as of July 23.

== Ox Cart fire ==
On June 8, the Ox Cart fire began from lightning 9 miles north of Villa Grove in Saguache County. No structures were burned in the fire, which scorched 1,152 acres. As of July 3, it was 100% contained.

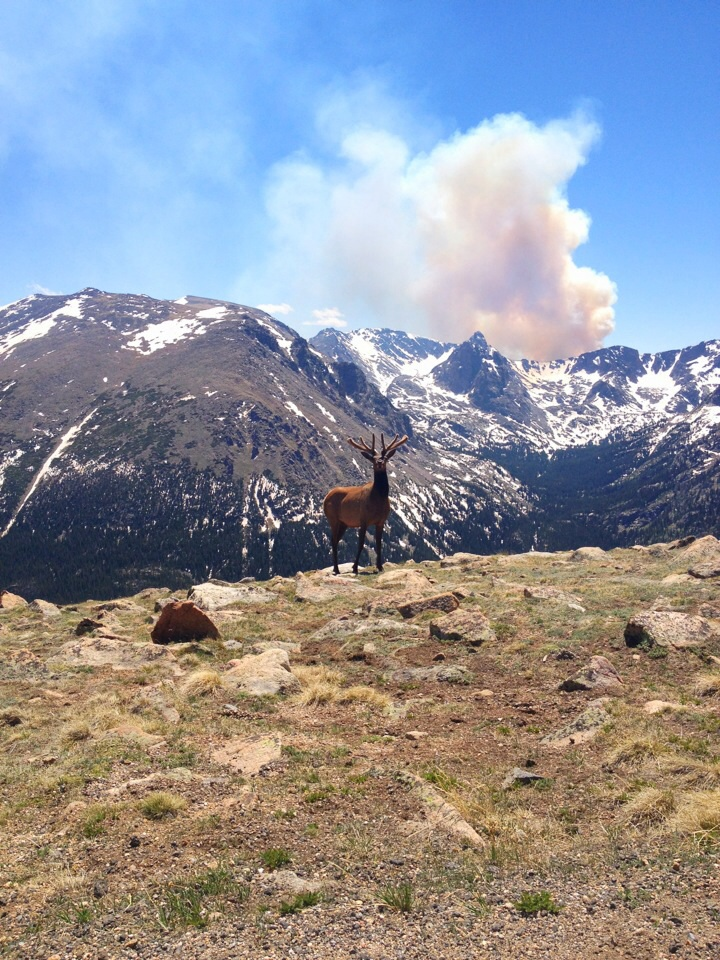
Smoke from the Big Meadows fire rises above the continental divide as seen from Trail Ridge Road. A Rocky Mountain elk stands in the foreground.

== Big Meadows fire ==
The Big Meadows Fire started on June 10, about five miles north of Grand Lake, in Rocky Mountain National Park. The fire was caused by a lightning strike and was contained at 653 acres on June 24.

== Royal Gorge fire ==
A fire started one mile west of Cañon City near the Royal Gorge Park, on June 11. The same day, the high winds caused the fire to jump the gorge into the park, resulting in the loss of 48 structures. The famous Royal Gorge Bridge suffered minor damage; only 32 of the planks on the deck were burned. During the fire, 905 inmates from the Colorado Territorial Correctional Facility were evacuated. 3,218 acres were burned as of June 17, and the cause remains unknown.

== Black Forest fire ==
Black Forest fire as seen from the US Air Force Academy, two hours after first reported.

The same day as the Royal Gorge Fire, a fire was sparked near Shoup Road and Darr Drive in Black Forest. The fire quickly grew to 8,000 acres (3,200 ha; 13 sq mi) acres by the next day. It destroyed 511 homes, and took the lives of two people. The fire eventually grew to 14,280 acres (5,780 ha; 22.31 sq mi), and was fully contained by June 20. Until the Marshall Fire in 2021, the Black Forest fire was the most destructive wildfire in Colorado history. The exact cause of the blaze is currently under investigation, but it is believed to be started by a human.

== East Peak fire ==
The East Peak Fire began near the East Spanish Peak, 10 miles (16 km) southwest of Walsenburg, in Huerfano County. The town of Walsenburg was put on pre-evacuation while the fire spread out of control after June 19. Eleven structures were destroyed, and the fire was contained at 13,572 acres (5,492 ha; 21.206 sq mi) by July 4. The blaze was caused by lightning.

== Ward Gulch fire ==
The Ward Gulch Fire was caused by a lightning strike 3 miles north of Rifle Gap Reservoir on June 14. The fire grew to 485 acres (196 ha; 0.758 sq mi) and was extinguished by June 21.

== Lime Gulch fire ==
The Lime Gulch Fire started on June 18 near Chair Rock, for which it was originally named, in Jefferson County near Buffalo Creek. The fire burned over the 2012 Lower North Fork burn scar. It was contained on June 23, and burned 511 acres (207 ha; 0.798 sq mi). The Lime Gulch Fire was started by lightning.

== Wild Rose fire ==
The Wild Rose fire was caused by lightning, 21 miles south of Rangley on June 19. The fire burned 1,067 acres (432 ha; 1.667 sq mi) and was fully contained on June 23.

== East Tschuddi fire ==
On July 20, a lightning strike 20 miles (32 km) northwest of Meeker sparked the East Tschuddi Fire in Rio Blanco County. It burned 2,009 acres (813 ha; 3.139 sq mi) acres, and was 90% contained by July 27. No homes were threatened by the fire.

== Citadel fire ==
Also northwest of Meeker, in Moffat County, the Citadel Fire was caused by a lightning strike on July 21. The fire burned 1,851 acres (749 ha; 2.892 sq mi) acres and was 90% contained as of July 27.

== Red Canyon Fire ==
The Red Canyon fire started August 12 a couple miles south of Glenwood Springs. The cause is yet to be determined and lightning is suspected. It burned 390 acres (160 ha; 0.61 sq mi) and was 100% contained by August 16.

== See also ==
- List of Colorado wildfires
