= Hayman Fire =

2002 wildfire in Colorado

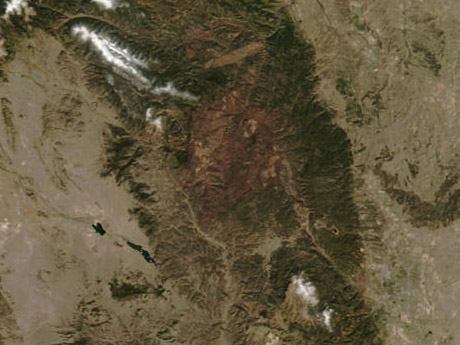
- The Hayman Fire (brown area in center of image), between the Kenosha Mountains (upper left) and Pikes Peak (lower right)
- Date: June 8 - July 18, 2002
- Location: Douglas, Jefferson, Park, and Teller counties, Colorado

Statistics
- Burned area: 138,114 acres (558.93 km^{2})
- Land use: Forest, rural

Impacts
- Deaths: 6

Ignition
- Cause: Arson
- Perpetrator: Terry Barton
- Motive: Accidental

The Hayman Fire was a forest fire that started on June 8, 2002, 35 miles (56 km) northwest of Colorado Springs, Colorado, and 22 miles (35 km) southwest of Denver, Colorado, and was contained on June 28, 2002. For nearly two decades, it was the largest wildfire in the state's recorded history, burning over 138,114 acres.

Hundreds of firefighters participated in fighting the fire, which cost nearly $40 million. The fire burned 133 homes and forced the evacuation of 5,340 people.

Smoke could be seen and smelled across the state from Vail, 55 miles (89 km) northwest, to Burlington, 188 miles (303 km) east, and from Broomfield, 50 miles (80 km) north, to Walsenburg, 130 miles (210 km) south.

The fire was classified as contained on June 28, 2002. The cause was later determined to be arson.

When a reporter asked then-Governor Bill Owens about the view of the fires from above, he said, "It looks as if all of Colorado is burning today." Many western slope residents blamed Owens for driving away tourists with the press' truncated version of the quote ("All of Colorado is burning.") The Hayman fire was named for a mining ghost town near Tappan Gulch.

== Impact ==
The fire resulted directly in the death of one civilian, and five firefighters were killed en route to the fire. Costs included $39.1 million in suppression costs and total private property losses valued at $40.4 million, and indirectly led to the death of five firefighters. Overall, 600 structures were burned in the fire including 133 homes, a commercial building, and 466 outbuildings. While the fire burned, record amounts of particulate matter were measured in the air.

As a result of the fire, flooding in the burn area increased. Consequently, many roads and bridges in the area were washed out. This included State Highway 67, the main highway that runs through the area. Other indirect destruction included sediment runoff into a reservoir that is used as a water source for Denver. The removal of this sediment cost $25 million.

Most of the burn area was within Pike National Forest. The fire caused the closure of a large part of the land as well as nearby Eleven Mile State Park and Spinney State Park. Local tourism saw a sharp decline and it is estimated that local businesses lost 50% of their seasonal revenues as a result of the fire-induced closures.

== Fatalities ==
Ann Dow, 50, suffered a fatal asthma attack on the evening of June 10, when heavy smoke from the fire drifted over her home south of Florissant. She quickly lapsed into unconsciousness and paramedics could not revive her. Her death certificate lists the cause as "acute asthma attack due to or as a consequence of smoke inhalation".

Five firefighters died from injuries sustained and six were injured from a June 21 traffic accident en route to the fire from Oregon: Zach Zigich, Retha Shirley, Jacob Martindale, Danial Rama, and Bart Bailey. They are listed in the memorial to fallen firefighters on the Wildland Firefighter Foundation's website.

== Criminal prosecutions ==
Terry Barton, a forestry technician with the United States Forest Service, set the fire in a campfire ring during a total burn ban triggered by a National Weather Service red flag warning. Barton claimed that she was attempting to burn a letter from her estranged husband. This claim was disputed by one of her teenage daughters, who testified that a psychology teacher had told Barton to write her feelings in a letter and burn it. The fire quickly spread out of control and eventually torched over 138,000 acres (560 km^{2}) and burned across four different counties. A federal grand jury indicted Barton on four felony counts of arson.

In December 2002, Barton pleaded guilty to two of the charges: setting fire to federal forest land and lying to investigators and was given a six-year sentence in federal prison. U.S. District Judge Richard Matsch refused, however, to impose the $14 million restitution asked for by prosecutors, saying he would not sentence her to a "life of poverty". Additionally, the State of Colorado sentenced Barton to 12 years in prison to run concurrently with the 6-year federal sentence. The state sentence was overturned on appeal, however, on grounds that the presiding judge had "the appearance of prejudice" because smoke from the fire had motivated him to voluntarily leave his home for one night. In March 2008, Barton was re-sentenced by a different judge to 15 years of probation and 1,000 hours of community service.

Several insurance companies filed a $7 million suit against the government in the fall of 2008, claiming that Barton was negligent in her duties. In November, Judge Wiley Daniel ruled that the government was not responsible for Barton's actions because she was not acting as a government worker.

In August 2018, Barton's sentence was extended another 15 years in the form of unsupervised probation (the unsupervised probation was ordered to save legal fees that would then be redirected towards restitution). Judge William Brian ordered that Barton continue to make payments toward the $14.5 million in restitution she owed as of the 2018 re-sentencing. The judge also ordered that Barton get a full-time job.

== Images of fire damage ==
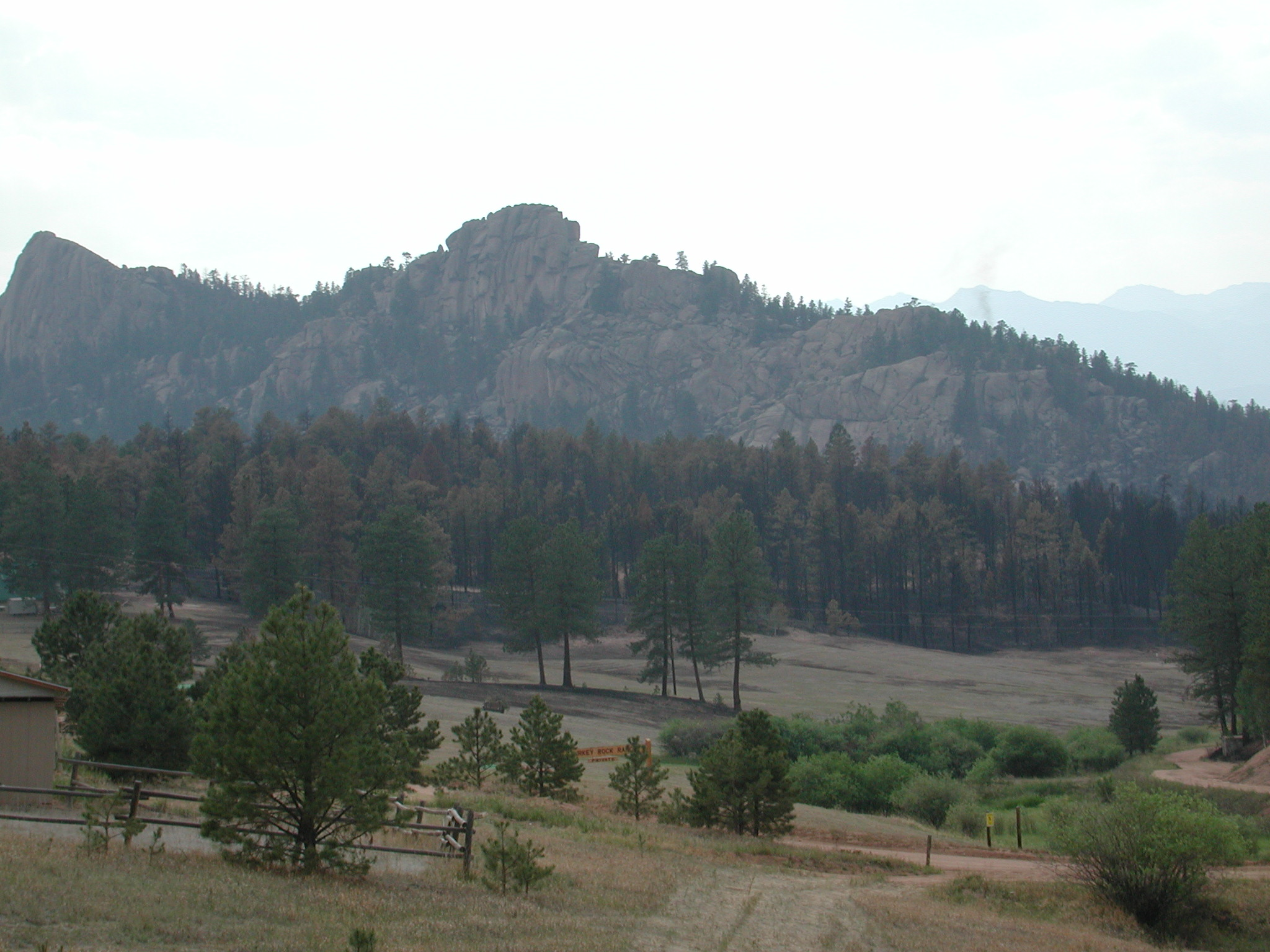
Fire damage as seen looking towards Turkey Rock

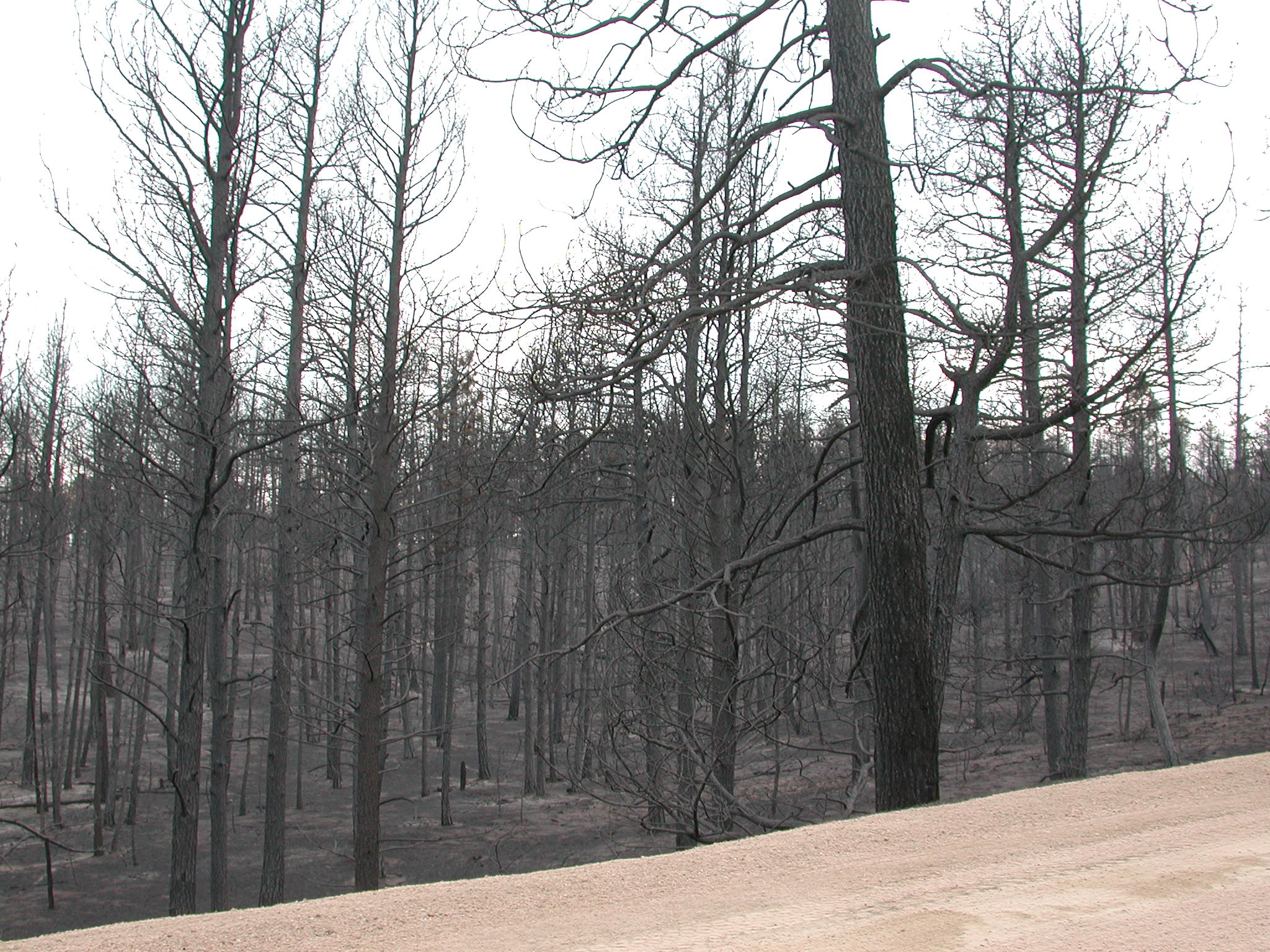
Complete burn as seen from roadway

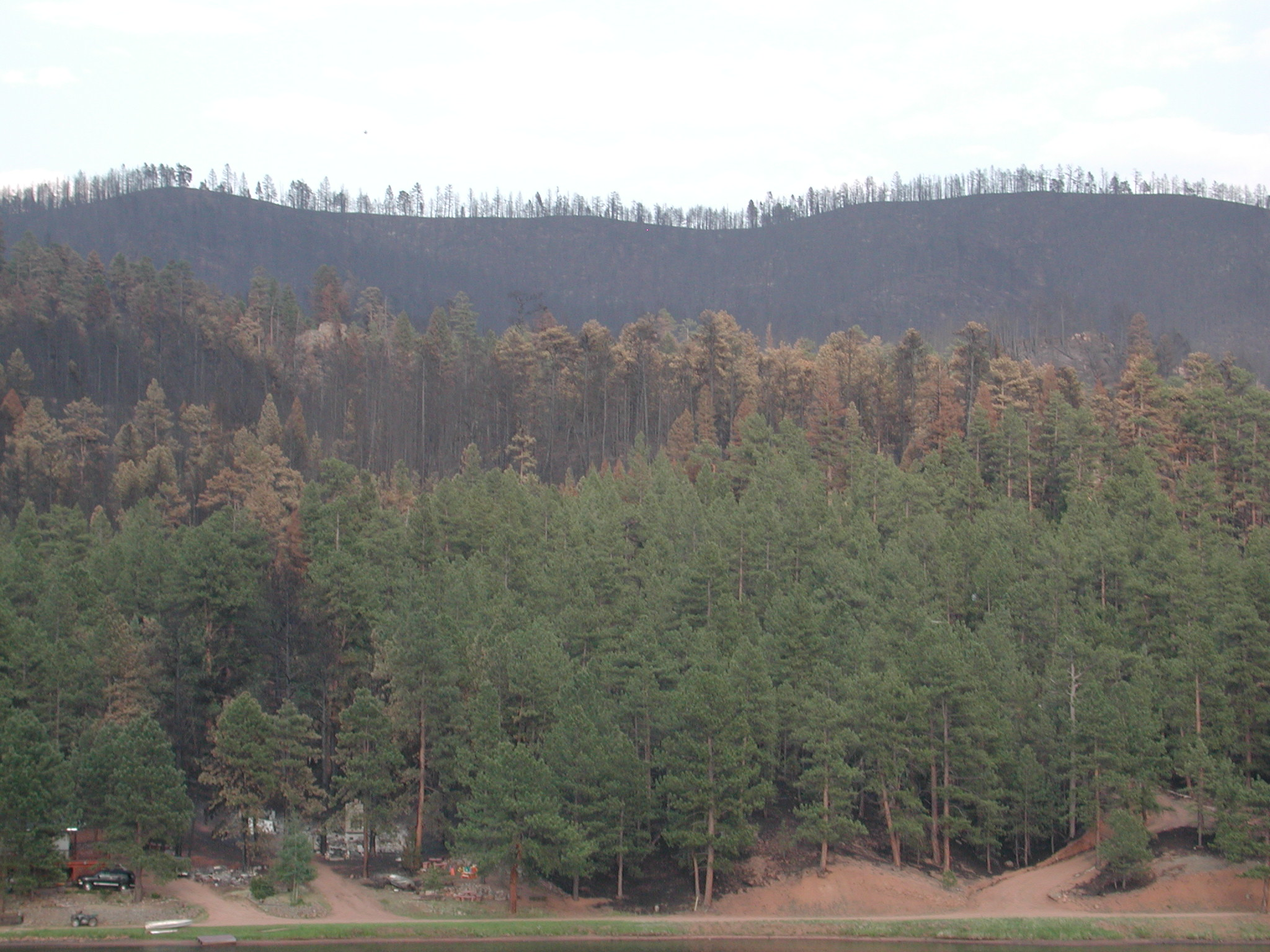
The damage to areas in the burn area varied greatly, as shown in this photo. The furthest hill burned completely, the middle hill was substantially burned, and the close hill relatively unburned.

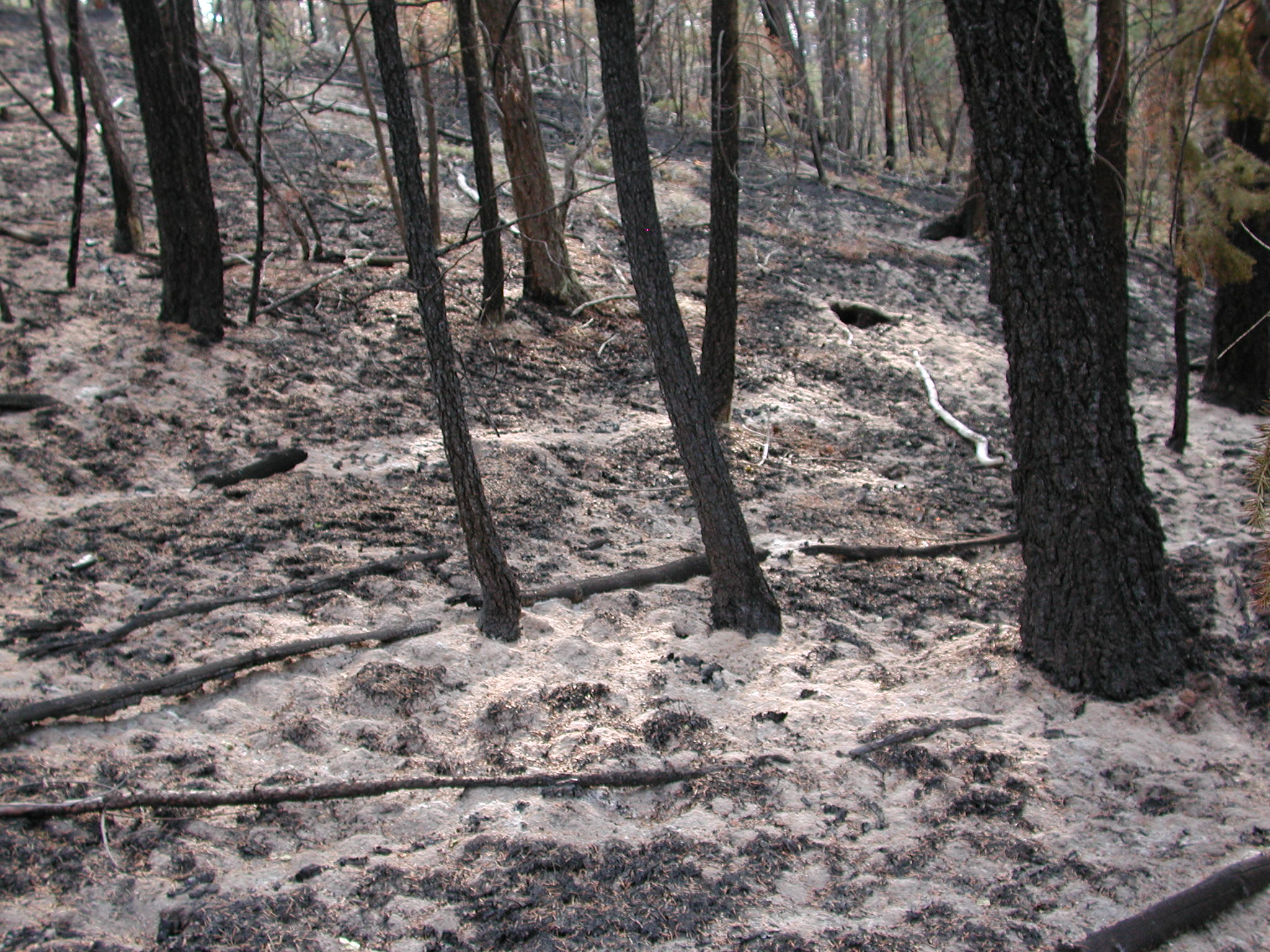
In many areas, the fire burned so hot that it reduced ground cover to bare soil

== See also ==
- Rodeo-Chediski Fire of 2002, a concurrent large wildfire in Arizona
- Healthy Forests Initiative, a federal law passed after the severe wildfires of 2002
- Pine Gulch Fire, a wildfire in 2020 that became the largest in state history
