= Goose Creek (South Platte River) =

South Platte River tributary

Goose Creek Lost Creek
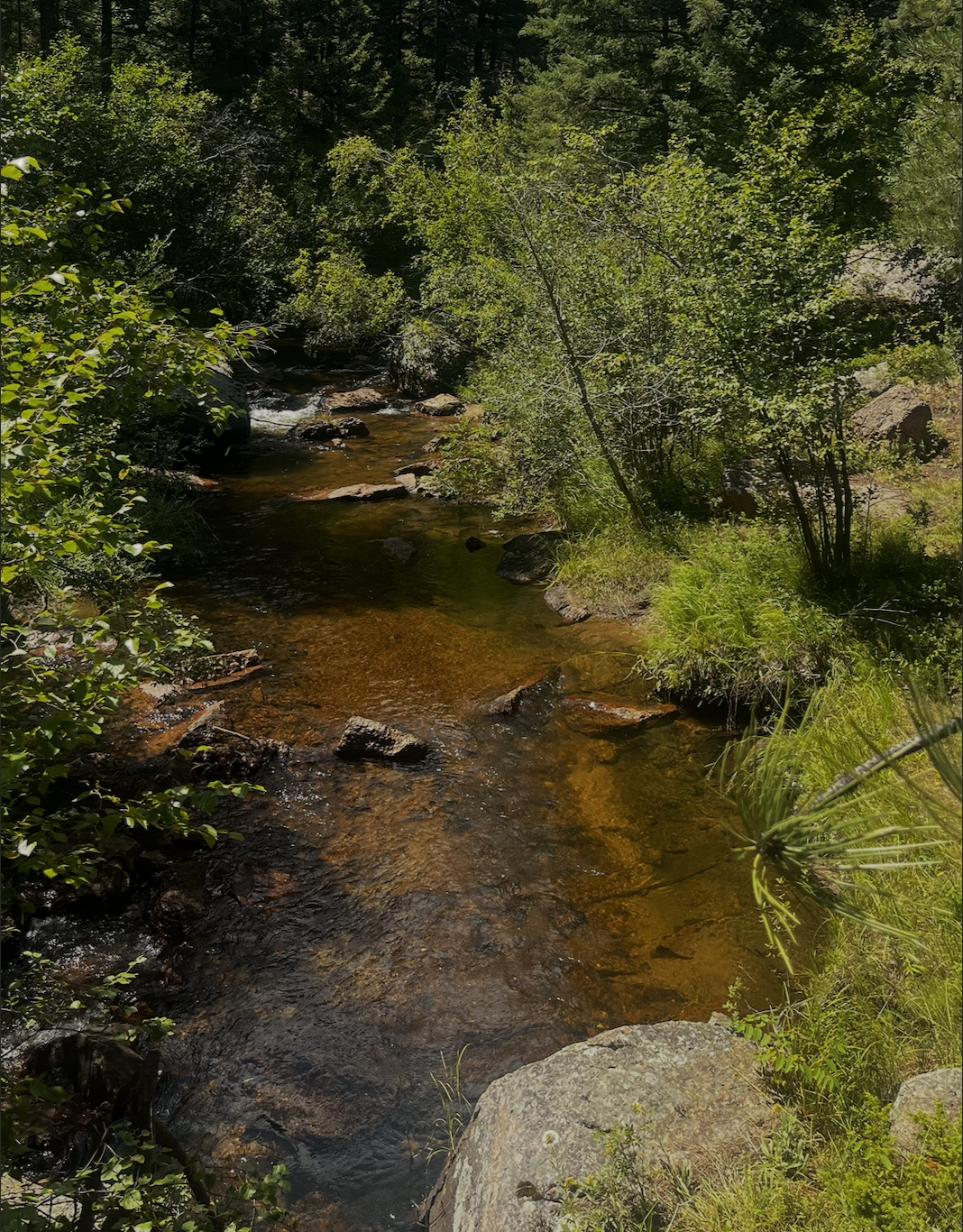
- Goose Creek in the Lost Creek Wilderness (August 23rd, 2025)

Location
- Country: United States
- State: Colorado

Physical characteristics
- Source: McCurdy Mountain
  - coordinates: 39°13′35.97″N 105°23′19.99″W

Basin features
- River system: South Platte River

Goose Creek is a tributary of the South Platte River, in Jefferson County, Colorado. It originates on McCurdy Mountain in the Lost Creek Wilderness in Pike National Forest.

== Course ==
Goose Creek originates on the slopes of McCurdy Mountain, in the Tarryall Mountains, a subrange of the Colorado Rockies. It flows generally southward through subalpine and montane habitats in the Lost Creek wilderness, where it disappears and reappears 9 times throughout its course as a result of the unique and highly fractured granitic geology of the area, hence the stream's local name "Lost Creek".

The canyon of Lost Creek is known for its unique rock formations, including granite spires, pinnacles and gorges.

After exiting the Lost Creek wilderness, Goose Creek turns to the east where its runs through the scar of the 2002 Hayman Fire towards Cheesman Reservoir and its confluence with the South Platte River in the Platte Canyon.

== History ==
The Goose Creek watershed lies in the historic territory of the Mouache Ute people, who seasonally inhabited the area for generations, as well as the Arapaho, who arrived in the area in the early 18th century.

In the 1890s, Goose Creek was selected by Denver Water as the site of a new reservoir to supply the rapidly growing city of Denver and its surroundings. The geology of the area was poorly understood and in particular, the difficulty of impounding a stream in a highly fractured geologic setting. Though there was significant investment and interest in the project, it was ultimately abandoned due to the leakage caused by the naturally-subterranean drainage pattern of the watershed. The remnants of workers' cabins and some machinery remain at the site of what was to be called the "Lost Park Reservoir".

== See also ==
- Water in Colorado
- Front Range
