= McCurdy Mountain =

Mountain in Colorado, United States

- Location within Colorado

Highest point
- Elevation: 12,172 ft (3,710 m)
- Prominence: 789 ft (240 m)
- Parent peak: Bison Peak
- Isolation: 2.05 mi (3.30 km)
- Coordinates: 39°13′10″N 105°28′06″W

Geography
- Location: Park County, Colorado, U.S.
- Parent range: Front Range, Tarryall Mountains
- Topo map(s): USGS 7.5' topographic map McCurdy Mountain, Colorado

McCurdy Mountain is a mountain summit in the Tarryall Mountains range of the Rocky Mountains of North America. The 12,172-foot (3,710 m) peak is located in the Lost Creek Wilderness of Pike National Forest, 28.2 miles (45.4 km) east (bearing 90°) of the Town of Fairplay in Park County, Colorado, United States. Like its neighbor, Bison Peak, McCurdy Mountain features a variety of unusual granite formations.

== See also ==
- List of Colorado mountain ranges
- List of Colorado mountain summits
  - List of Colorado fourteeners
  - List of Colorado 4000 meter prominent summits
  - List of the most prominent summits of Colorado
- List of Colorado county high points
