= Modern Woodmen Sanatorium =

Former sanatorium in Colorado Springs, CO

- Modern Woodmen of America
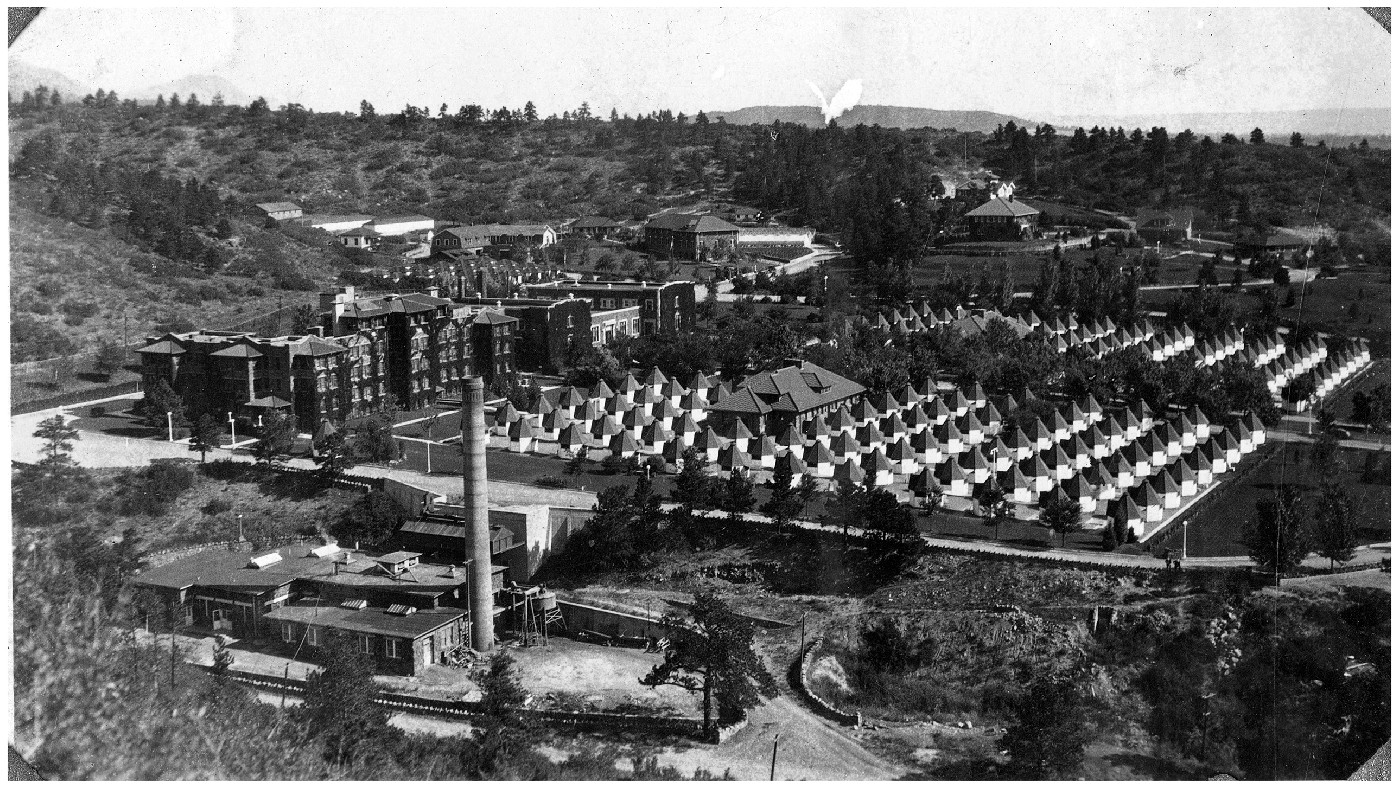
- Birdseye View of Modern Woodmen of America Sanatorium

- Location of the former Modern Woodmen Sanatorium Modern Woodmen Sanatorium (Colorado)

Geography
- Location: 7665 Assisi Heights, Colorado Springs, CO 80919
- Coordinates: 38.94720°N 104.87480°W

Organisation
- Type: Specialist

Services
- Beds: 200–245
- Speciality: Tuberculosis sanatorium

History
- Opened: December 17, 1908
- Closed: April 25, 1947
- Demolished: 1994

Video promoting the Modern Woodmen Sanatorium (c. 1933). It was produced for the Modern Woodmen of America, and it was made by Ray-Bell Films, Inc.

The Modern Woodmen Sanatorium (or Modern Woodmen of America Sanatorium) was a sanatorium in northwestern Colorado Springs, that was operated by the Modern Woodmen of America, a fraternal benefit society. It operated from 1909 to 1947. It treated about 12,000 patients during the years of its operation, and cured more than 60 percent of them. In the first half of the 20th century, it was the largest of the 17 sanatoria in the Pikes Peak region that cared for sufferers of tuberculosis.

== Pre-establishment ==
=== Site selection ===
==== Review of locations ====
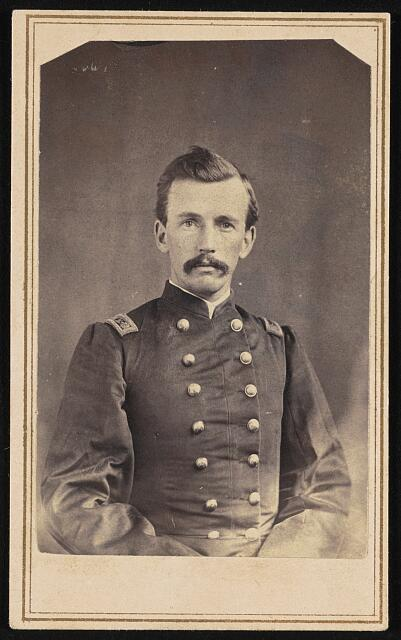
Charles W. Hawes in his Civil War uniform (c. 1860s). Later known as Major Hawes, he served as the Head Clerk of the Modern Woodmen of America and was a member of the executive council that selected the Colorado Springs site in 1907.

In 1907, Adolphus R. Talbot, Major Charles W. Hawes, Frank O. Van Galder, Edward E. Murphy, and Rezin R. Bort—all representing the Modern Woodmen of America—began reviewing numerous locations around the Western United States to look for a site for the proposed facility. They were in search of a location that had dry air, mild temperatures, and a climate suitable enough for living in the open year-round. In July 1907, the Salvation Army offered its sanatorium in the former settlement of Amity, Colorado, but the proposal was not accepted. The Colorado Springs Chamber of Commerce made land offers to convince the executive council of the Modern Woodmen of America to build the facility in Colorado Springs.

==== Selection of the Ambler Ranch ====
In October 1907, they selected to build the sanatorium on a 1,000 to 1,380-acre property in northwestern Colorado Springs. The property was known as the 'Ambler Ranch'. In December 1907, the executive council of the Modern Woodmen of America paid $15,000 to purchase the ranch.

== Construction ==
=== Construction planning ===
A few days later after the ranch was purchased, an appeal to the members of the executive council was issued, asking 10 cents per capita to start construction. In June 1908, a national convention of the Modern Woodmen of America called the "Peoria Head Camp" was held in Peoria, Illinois. During the meeting, a construction plan for the tuberculosis sanatorium was adopted. Dr. John E. White, the president of the former Nordrach Ranch Sanitarium, was appointed as the Superintendent and Medical Director of the Modern Woodmen Sanatorium, and he instructed to immediately proceed the construction of the sanatorium. Preliminaries to building operations begun early in July 1908, following approved detail plans.

=== Start of construction ===
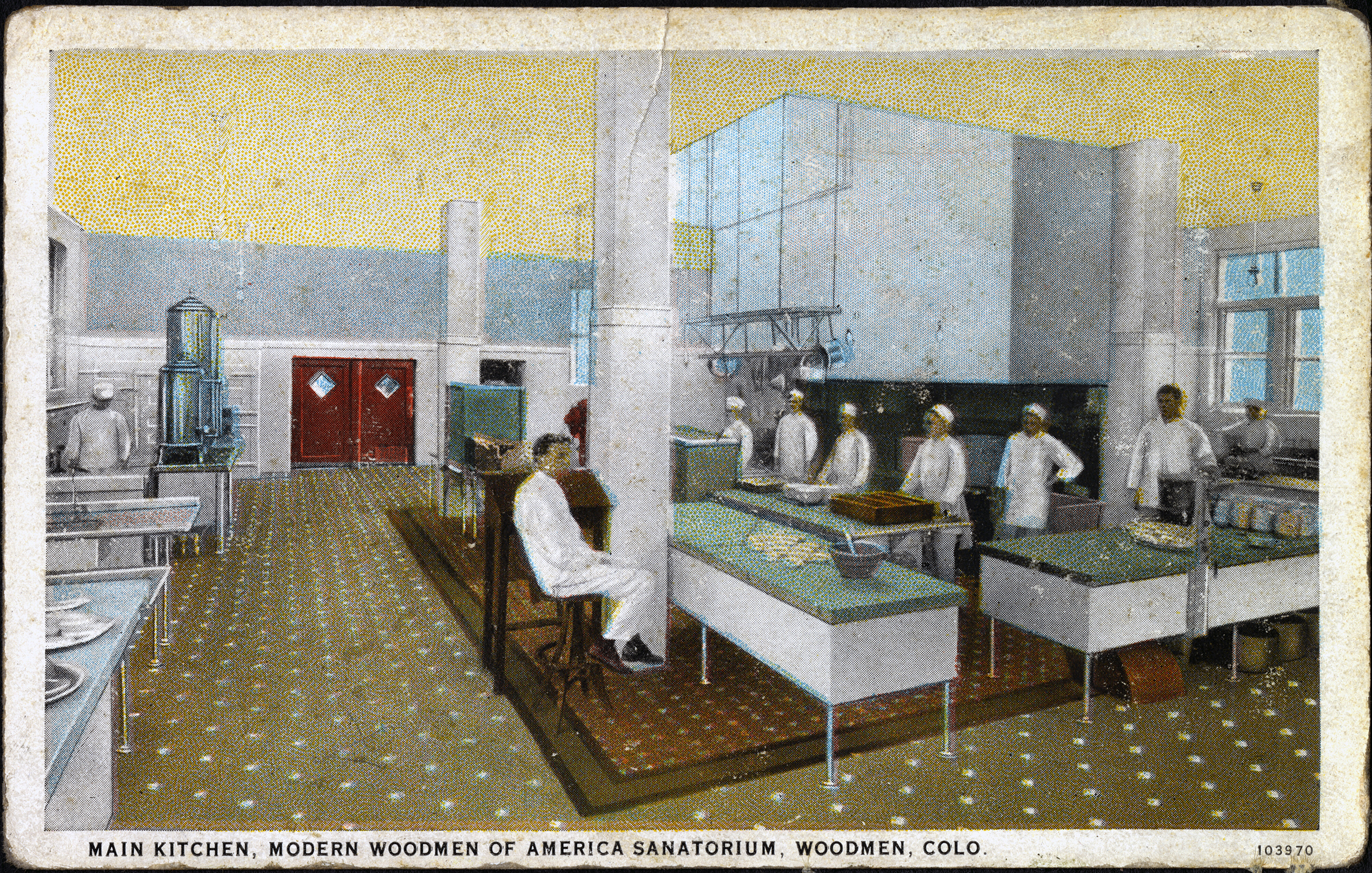
Food workers stand in a kitchen at the Modern Woodmen Sanatorium. (c. 1914)

Construction started, and the first sixty-tent cottages, a permanent utility building, kitchen, dining, and store rooms were ready to begin receiving patients.

=== Continued construction ===
On December 17, 1908, the sanatorium opened, but construction continued, with more tent-cottages, and buildings such as a second utility building were built. Construction finally stopped when there were about 200 to 245 tent-cottages, an administration building, hospital, auditorium, housing for staff members, laundry, a dairy farm, power plant, train station, reservoir, orchard, and post office. The sanatorium cost $1.5 million to construct.

=== Gardiner tent-cottages ===
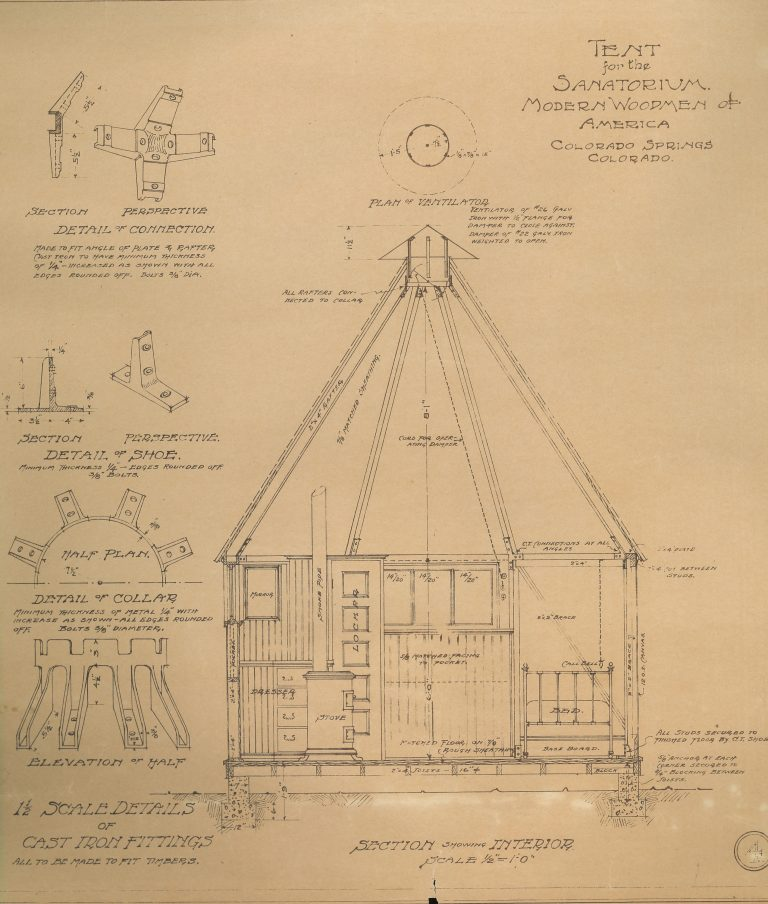
Drawing for Gardiner tent-cottages built at the Modern Woodmen Sanatorium. (c. 1909)

The tent-cottages at the Modern Woodmen Sanatorium were designed by Dr. Charles Fox Gardiner. They were inspired by Ute tepees. The tent-cottages were made of either wood or canvas. Their floors were circular. They were heated with steam, and included a bed, closet, chairs, washstand, and electric lights. The tent-cottages were octogonal, and painted red, white, and green to match the colors of the Modern Woodmen of America. They were open at the top, and had inlets for fresh air at the base. Each tent-cottage hosted one patient, and the purpose of them was to keep patients isolated, and from spreading tuberculosis.

== Opening ==
On December 17, 1908, the Modern Woodmen Sanatorium opened. Eric Lund, from Alexandria, Minnesota was the sanatoriums' first patient.

== Treatment methods ==
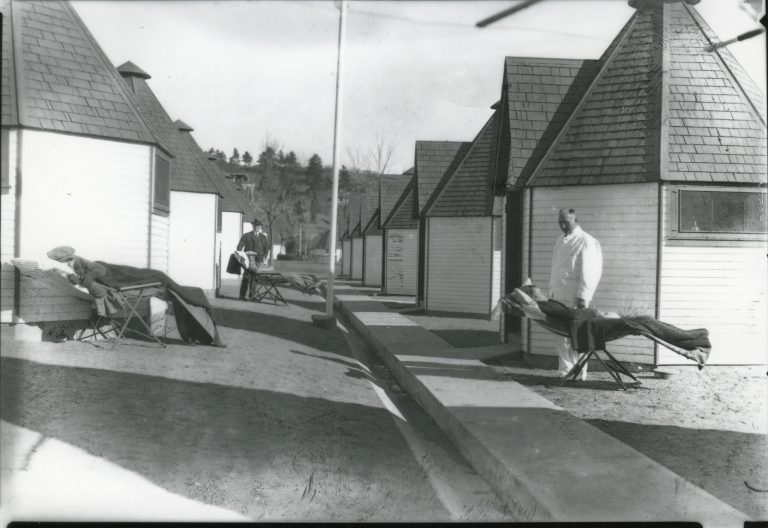
Patients at the Modern Woodmen Sanatorium partaking in Heliotherapy. (c. 1927)

=== Open-air treatment ===
At the Modern Woodmen Sanatorium, patients had to partake in multiple methods for treatment of tuberculosis. The treatment was free, but personal needs such as laundry, hostage, and barbering had a cost. For maximized access to fresh air, patients had to sit outside in steamer chairs six to eight hours a day for possibly weeks, months, or years. The temperatures, and pulse rates of patients were frequently monitored. The fresh air was cold at times, so patients were advised to bring warm clothing, such as a heavy overcoat, a cap with ear flaps, and mittens or gloves.

=== Heliotherapy ===
Patients at the sanatorium also partook in heliotherapy. They were instructed to lounge in the sun for long periods of time in order to "kill the tuberculosis".

=== Diet ===
Patients at the sanatorium had to eat rare meat, raw eggs, milk, and rye bread three times a day in order to boost their immune system. If they had suffered significant weight loss from tuberculosis, then this high-protein diet would help them fatten up.

== Closing ==
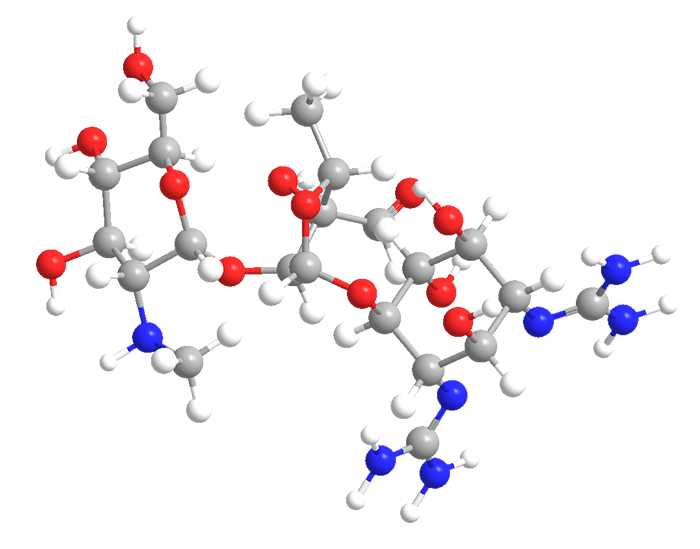
Streptomycin is used as an antibiotic medication to treat numerous diseases, including tuberculosis. It was proven to be more effective at curing tuberculosis than sanatoriums.

On April 25, 1947, physicians at the Modern Woodmen Sanatorium discharged the last nine patients. Biochemical discoveries during World War II led to new antibiotics and drugs being created. Antibiotics such as streptomycin could cure tuberculosis, and it was proven to be more effective than sanatoriums. This put sanatoria such as the Modern Woodmen Sanatorium out of business. The Modern Woodmen of America put the property up for sale.

== Subsequent use ==
=== Purchase by Blevins Davis ===
Three years after the sanatorium closed, millionaire Blevins Davis purchased the property for $1.5 million. He had no immediate plans what to do with the facility, but he hoped that "whatever it became would be a positive addition to the community". He sold the tent-cottages as low as $25 for each one, and some of them became backyard sheds and playhouses. One of them came to the Colorado Springs Pioneer Museum, where it now is an exhibit. Blevins Davis sold the property to the Sisters of St. Francis of Perpetual Adoration in 1954.

=== Sisters of St. Francis of Perpetual Adoration ===
After the Sisters of St. Francis of Perpetual Adoration claimed the property of the sanatorium in 1954, they renamed the site 'Mount St. Francis', and turned it into a retreat, conference, and nursing center, which are currently used. The site was also turned into the St. Francis of Assisi Parish in 1987.

== Fires and incidents ==
=== 1994 arson ===
In 1994, four teenagers burned the sanatorium's dairy farm complex in an arson, which left ruins that were bulldozed. Condominiums took their place.

=== Waldo Canyon fire ===
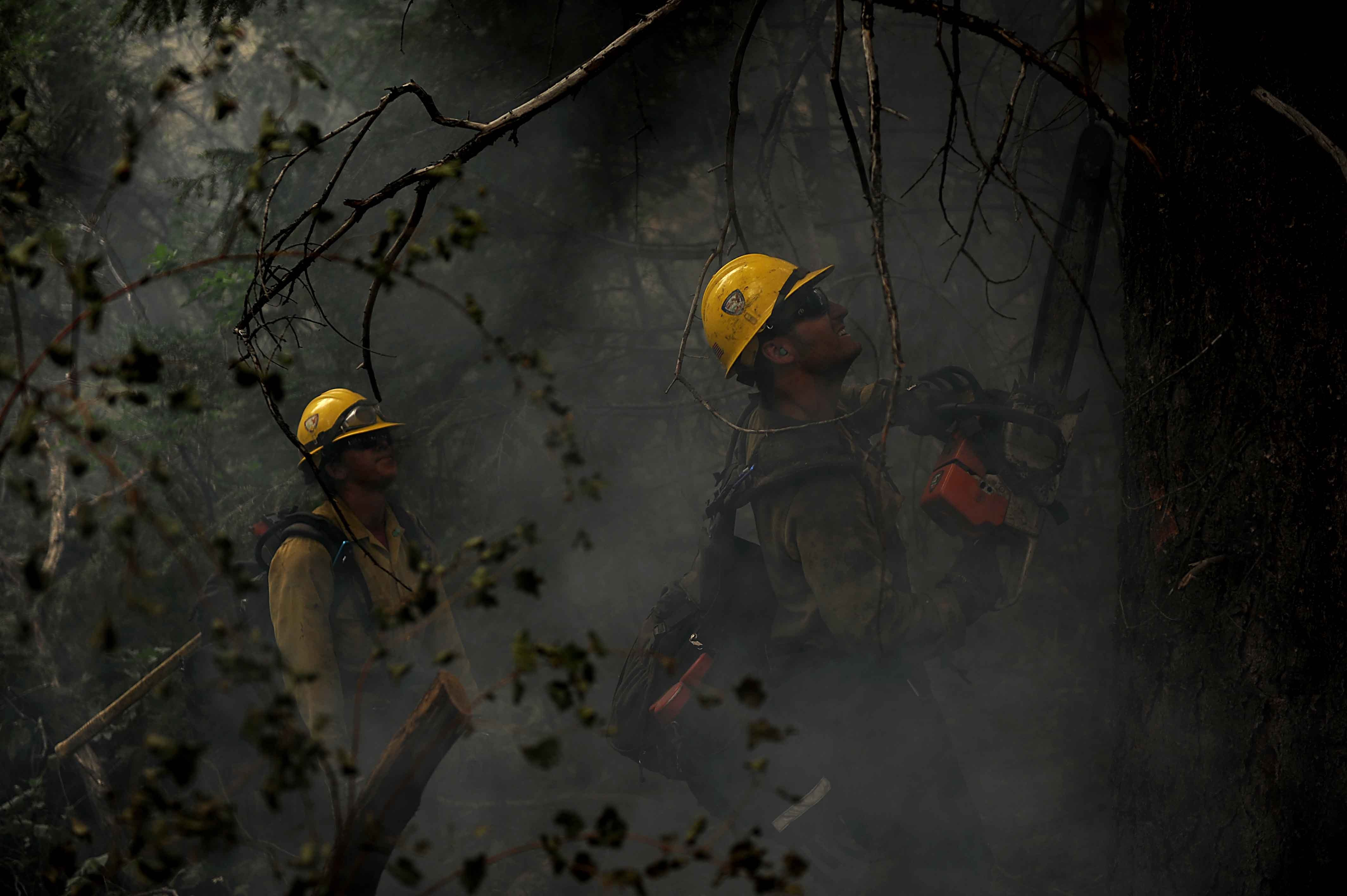
Brad Mabery, right, cuts a tree with his chainsaw with the help of Marissa Halbeisen while cutting and clearing a fire line in the Mount St. Francis area of Colorado Springs (c. June 28, 2012)

On June 26, 2012, because of the Waldo Canyon Fire, the Colorado Springs Police Department assigned five police officers to assist 17 American Medical Response ambulances to evacuate 104 patients from the Mount St. Francis Nursing Center. Two Colorado Springs Fire Department trucks also assisted. A charred field was found on the west side of the property of Mount St. Francis. A day later, a flame front that blew through the Peregrine neighborhood near Blodgett Peak was pushed by a thunderstorm into a residential area west of the Mount St. Francis Nursing Center. It was quickly contained by the Colorado Springs Fire Department, mutual-aid fire departments, and the United States Forest Service strike team. Several homes were affected by the firestorm, but it was extinguished by the crews there after it passed.

== Roads ==
=== Woodmen Road ===
Woodmen Road is a major east-west corridor in Colorado Springs. It is named after the former Modern Woodmen Sanatorium.

== See also ==
- Tuberculosis treatment in Colorado Springs
- Modern Woodmen of America
- Tuberculosis
- Blevins Davis
- Sisters of St. Francis of Perpetual Adoration
- Colorado Springs Pioneer Museum
- Waldo Canyon Fire
