= Cripple Creek District Museum =

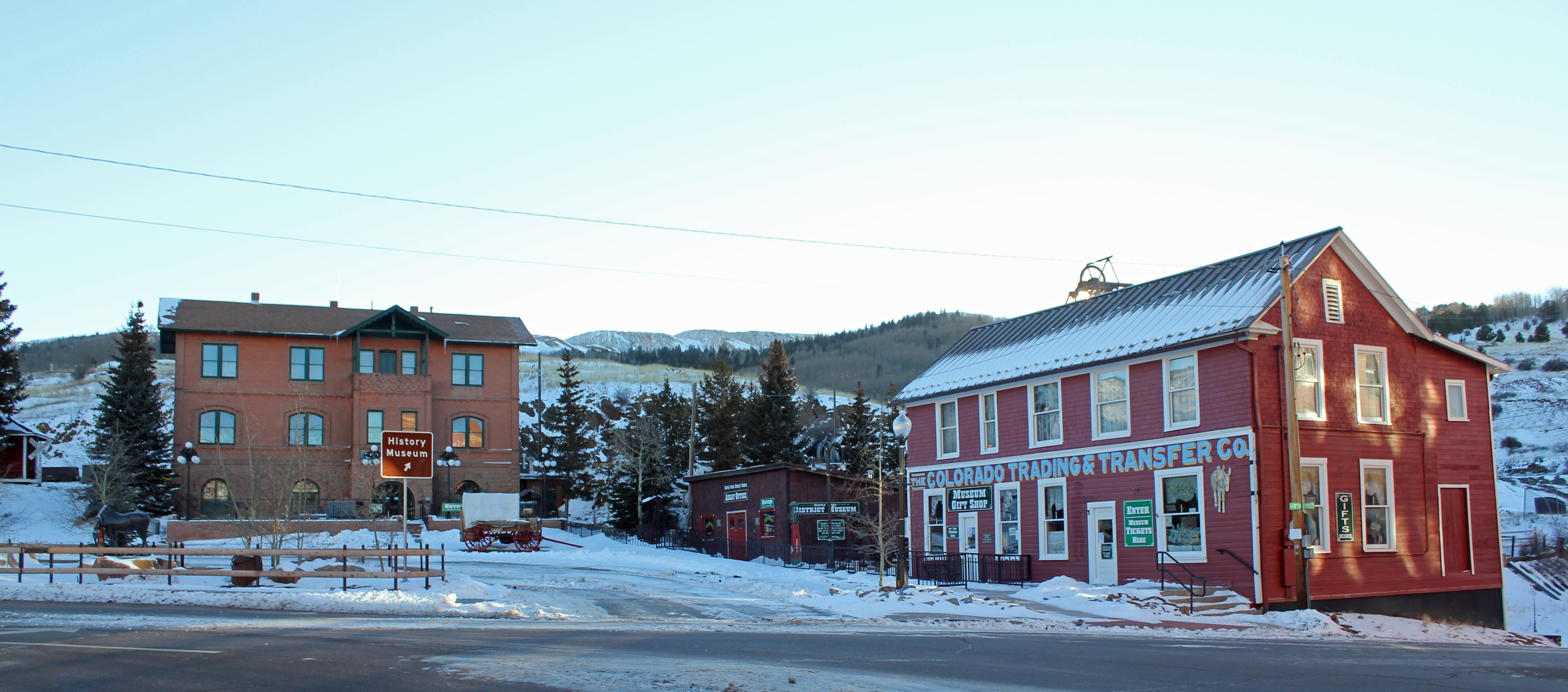
- Established: 1953
- Location: 5th & Bennett Ave. Cripple Creek, Colorado
- Coordinates: 38°44′49″N 105°10′20″W
- Type: History museum
- Website: cripplecreekmuseum.com

The Cripple Creek District Museum is a museum located in Cripple Creek, Colorado. Founded in 1953 by Blevins Davis and Richard Wayne Johnson, the Museum has five historic buildings: The 1894 Colorado Trading & Transfer Company building, the 1895 Midland Terminal Depot that was used as a depot until 1949; a turn-of-the-century Assay Office, the former one-room home of French Blanche LeCroix from the Cripple Creek District town of Midway, and a miner's cabin circa 1890–1930.

Today the Museum has four living areas illustrating life in the Victorian Era, an Art Gallery, a 15-minute video on the Assay Process, and numerous displays exhibiting photographs, maps, newspapers, books, wagons, minerals, mining equipment, the history of businesses, lodges, churches and schools, thousands of furnishings and personal items belonging to former pioneers to the District, information on towns and camps within the District and Teller County, and a Museum Gift Shop with hundreds of books and unusual items.
