= Flying W Ranch =

Coordinates: 38°55′39″N 104°52′14″W

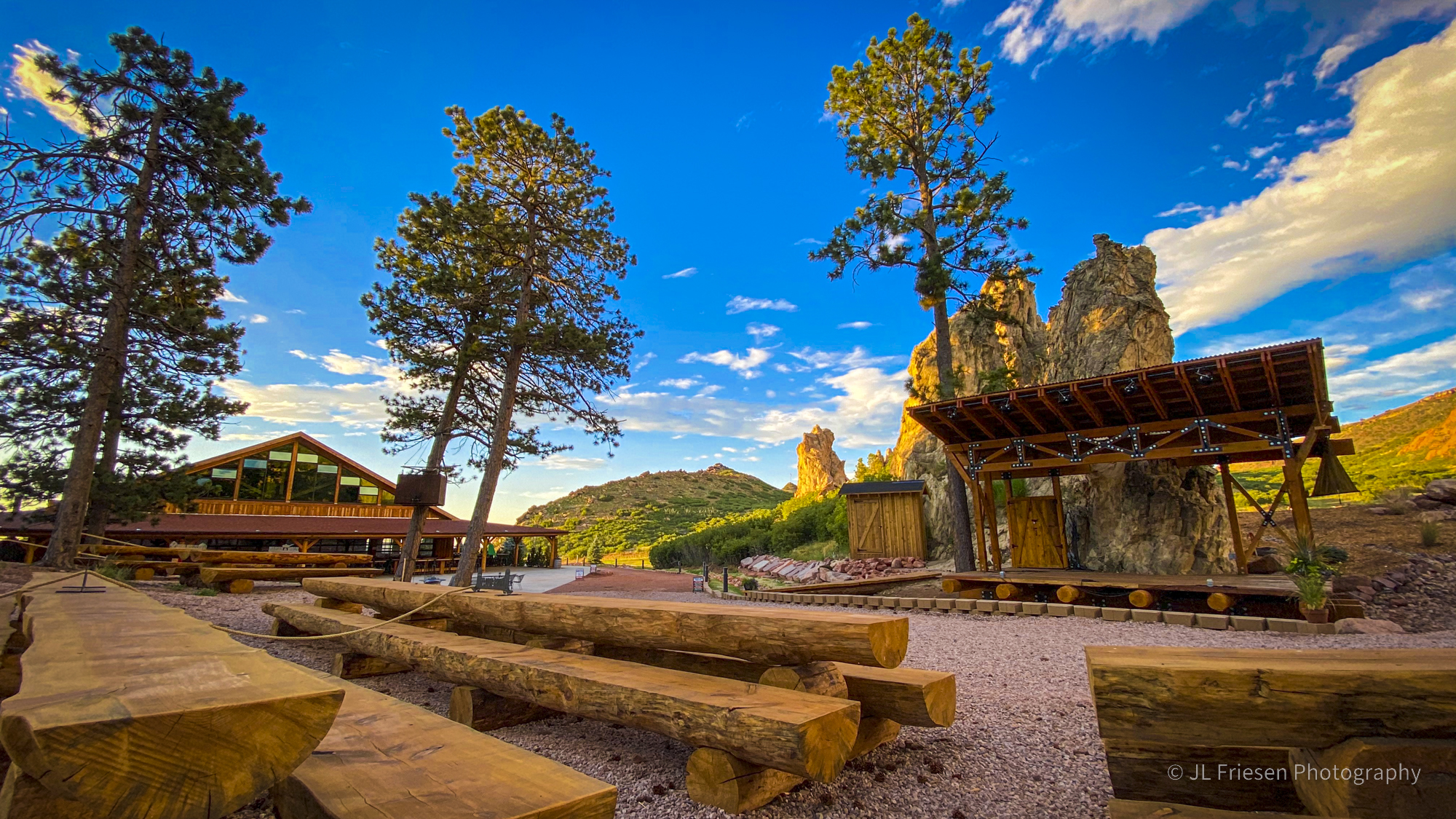
- Flying W Ranch, from the Outdoor Eating Area. On the right is the outdoor stage, to the left is the indoor Facility.
- Interactive map of the Flying W Ranch area

General information
- Status: Opened, partially under reconstruction
- Type: Restaurant, Working mountain cattle ranch
- Location: 3330 Chuckwagon Rd, Colorado Springs, CO 80919, Colorado Springs, Colorado, United States
- Inaugurated: 1953

The Flying W Ranch is a working mountain cattle ranch, and since 1953, a tourism and entertainment venue in the foothills of Colorado Springs, Colorado. From May to October, the ranch features outdoor chuckwagon suppers typical of those served on cattle drives, and western style living history areas. The ranch burned during the Waldo Canyon Fire in 2012, but its owners rebuilt and subsequently reopened.

== History ==
Russ and Marian Wolfe started the Flying W Chuckwagon in 1953. During the summer, people would come out from town to ride horses over the extensive ranch lands with Russ Wolfe ramrodding the outings. Some evenings, the group would be small enough for Marian to invite the riders to share in a "potluck." Russ and Marian decided to make the affair a regular event – a scenic horseback ride followed by a home-cooked meal under the stars around an open camp fire.

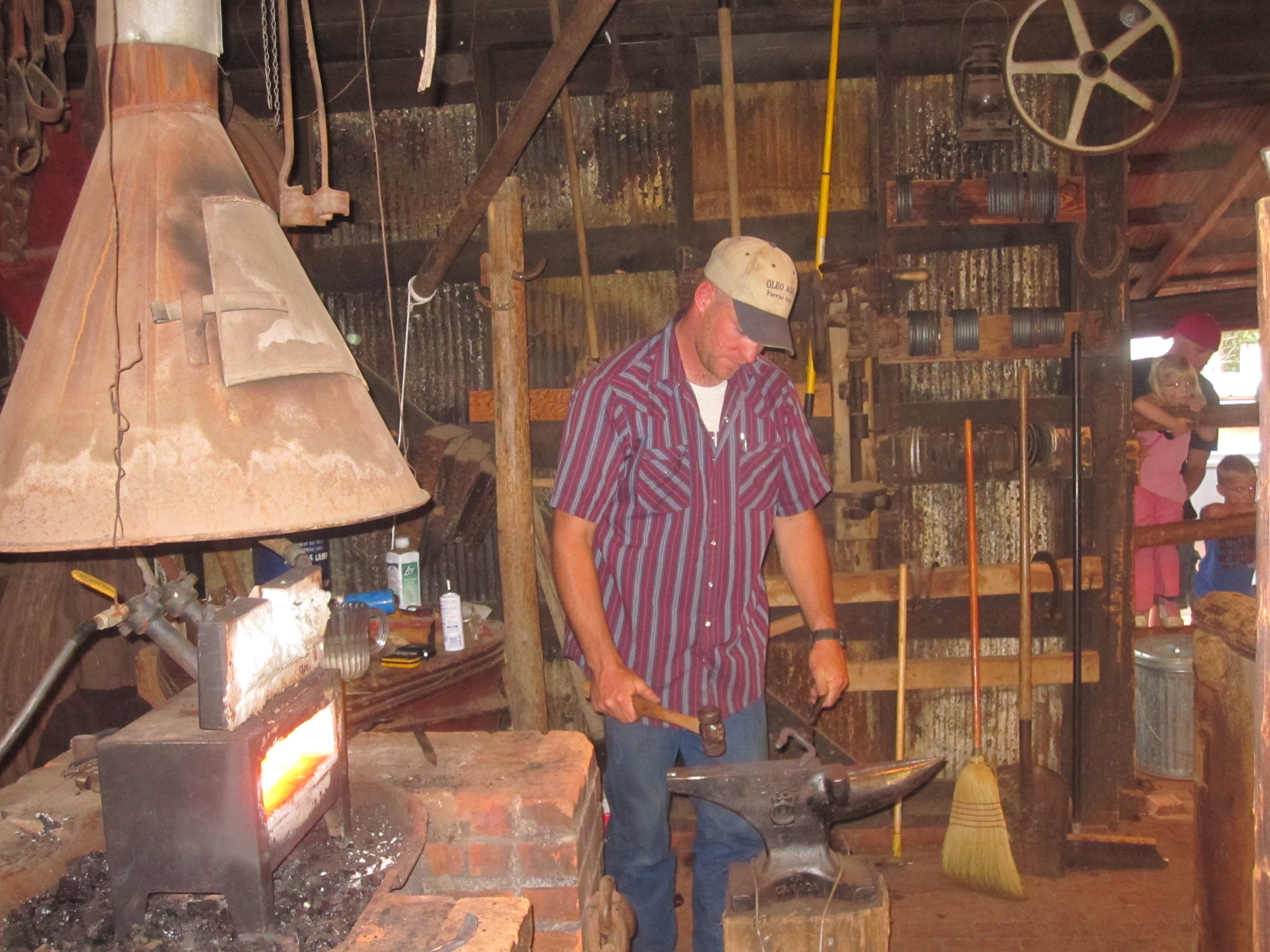
Working blacksmith at Flying W

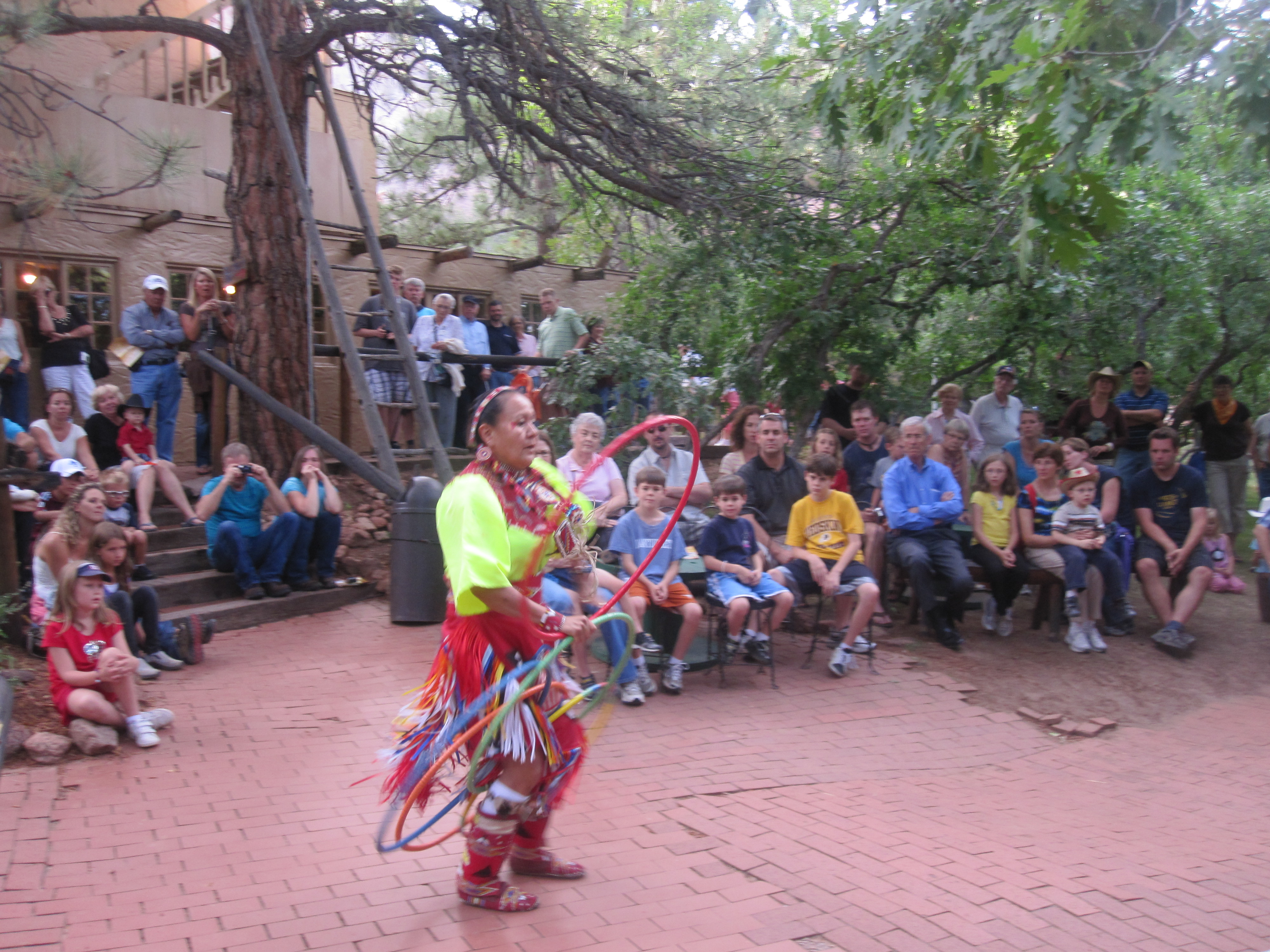
Indian dance show at the Flying W

Russ and Marian built the Western Village. Eventually consisting of 29 structures, including the Church, Jail, School House, Taos Pueblo, Printing Press, Kiva, Library, Drug Store, Homestead, Ute Theater, Train Depot, and more. All of these structures were built or transferred to the ranch.

Until the Waldo Canyon Fire in 2012, beginning the first weekend in October, meals and entertainment moved indoors to the Winter Steakhouse, which was originally the Ute Theatre in Colorado Springs. The building was dismantled after it closed in 1968 and moved to a new location at the Flying W where it was rebuilt as a steakhouse. Shows were performed in the Winter Steakhouse from October through the third weekend in December, and again from early March through mid May. The Picketwire Bar, named for the Purgatoire River was built in the 1880s and moved to the ranch in 1969.

The Flying W Chuckwagon (with the Flying W Wranglers) is part of the Chuckwagon Association of the West, which consists of five other member chuckwagons located in Wyoming, South Dakota, New Mexico, Missouri, and Colorado, all of which featured traditional chuck-wagon cooking, followed by professional-quality after-supper entertainment of comedy and western songs.

The Flying W Ranch was destroyed by the Waldo Canyon fire on June 26, 2012. The owners have committed to rebuilding it and portions the ranch reopened July 10, 2020. The General Manager at the time, Jay Chladek, had his wedding and reception June 22, 2012, and left for his honeymoon the morning of the evacuation. He was still on his honeymoon when the Flying W Ranch was destroyed by the fire. He worked for the Flying W Ranch for almost 27 years. The final event at the location was a wedding in the Old Chapel on Saturday June 23, 2012, the day the fire started. The wedding party and guests were evacuated by police immediately following the service as staff and employees rushed to save as many artifacts as possible. On June 29, 2019 ground was broken on a new 8000 square foot event facility with seating for 900. The facility reopened in 2020 with an expanded number of animals, a variety of activities and concerts by a western performance band the Flying W Wranglers.

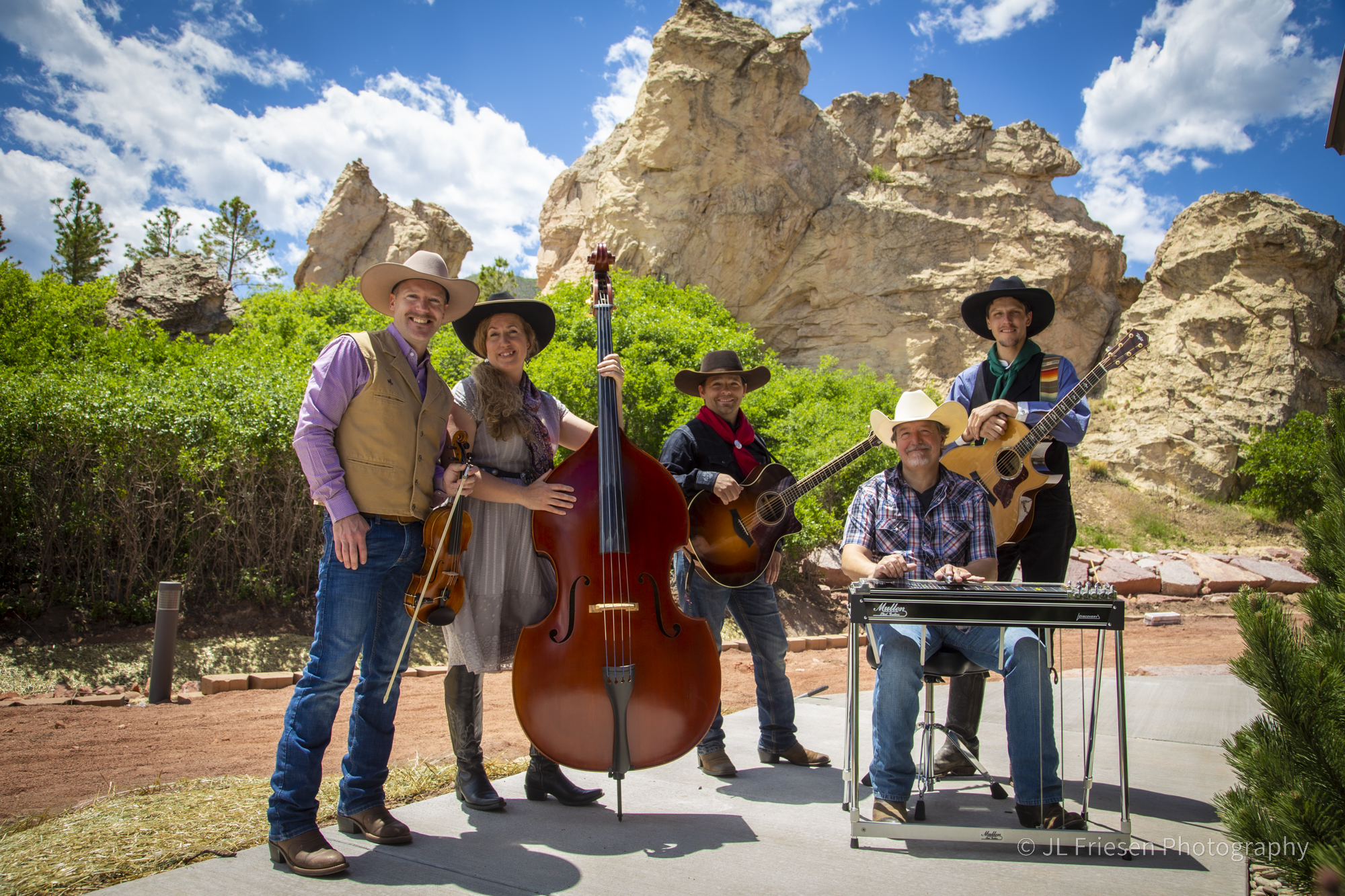
The Flying W Wranglers in 2020: Seth Weil, Cassy Weil, Aaron Weil, Ross Huskinson, & Jesse Friesen.

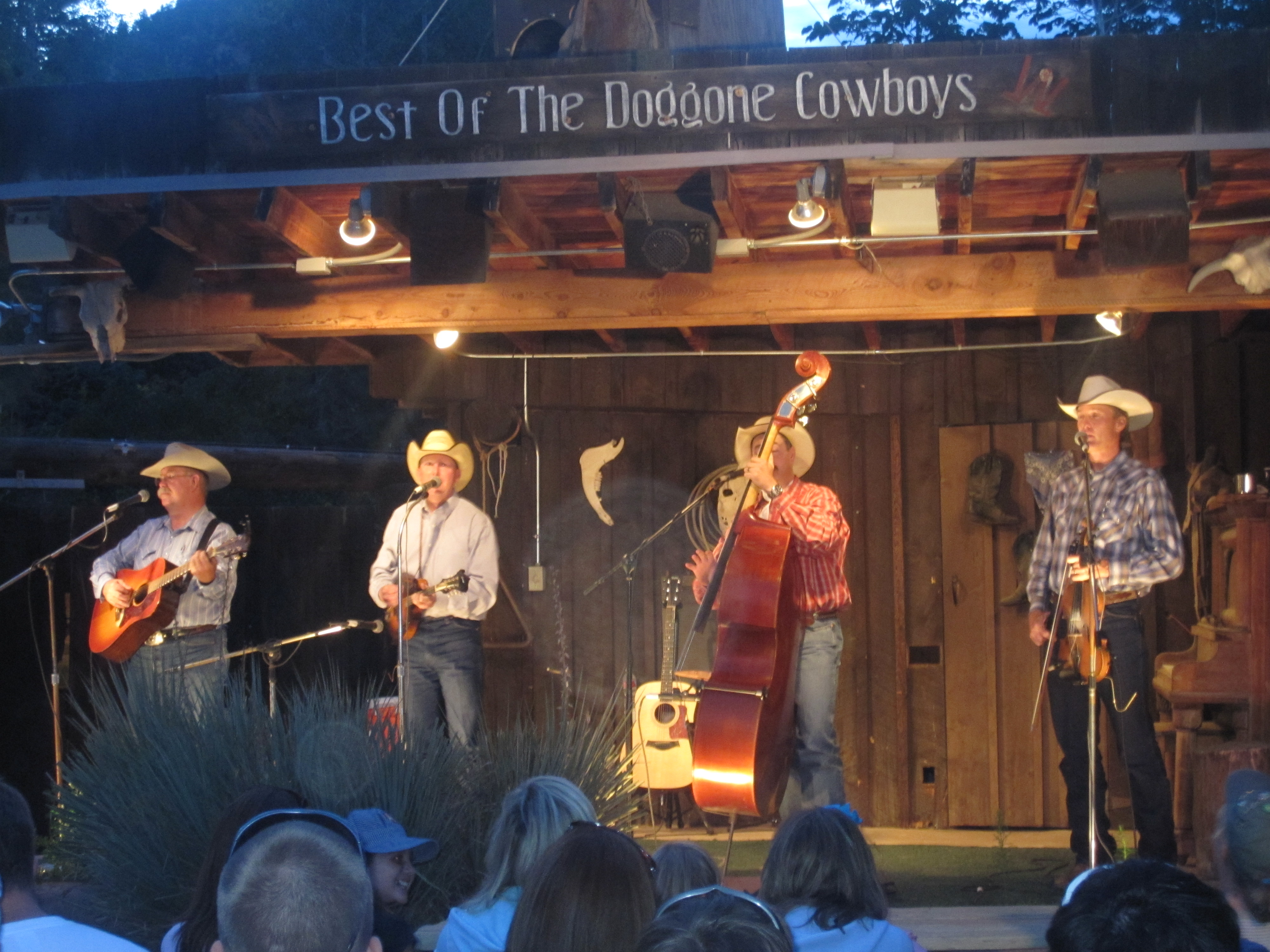
Flying W Wranglers, self-described as the "Best of the Doggone Cowboys," perform on July 28, 2010, in Colorado Springs.

== Flying W Foundation ==
Following the destruction of the Flying W Ranch and 346 homes within the neighboring community of Mountain Shadows, the Flying W Ranch Foundation was formed.

The Flying W Ranch Foundation is a non-profit 501(c)(3) organization based in Colorado Springs, Colorado. Their purpose and mission is to restore and mitigate the Waldo Canyon burn area, preserve the history of the Old West, and be a blessing to the community. The Foundation does work such as:

- Installing log erosion control structures to stabilize hill slopes and drainages prone to flood events
- Planting seed and spreading mulch over acres of burned terrain
- Planting saplings to jumpstart the restoration of the forest
- Removing noxious weeds
- Mastication of burned tree stands

== See also ==
- Movie ranch
- Flying J Wranglers of Alto, New Mexico
