= Blodgett Peak =

Mountain in the American state of Colorado

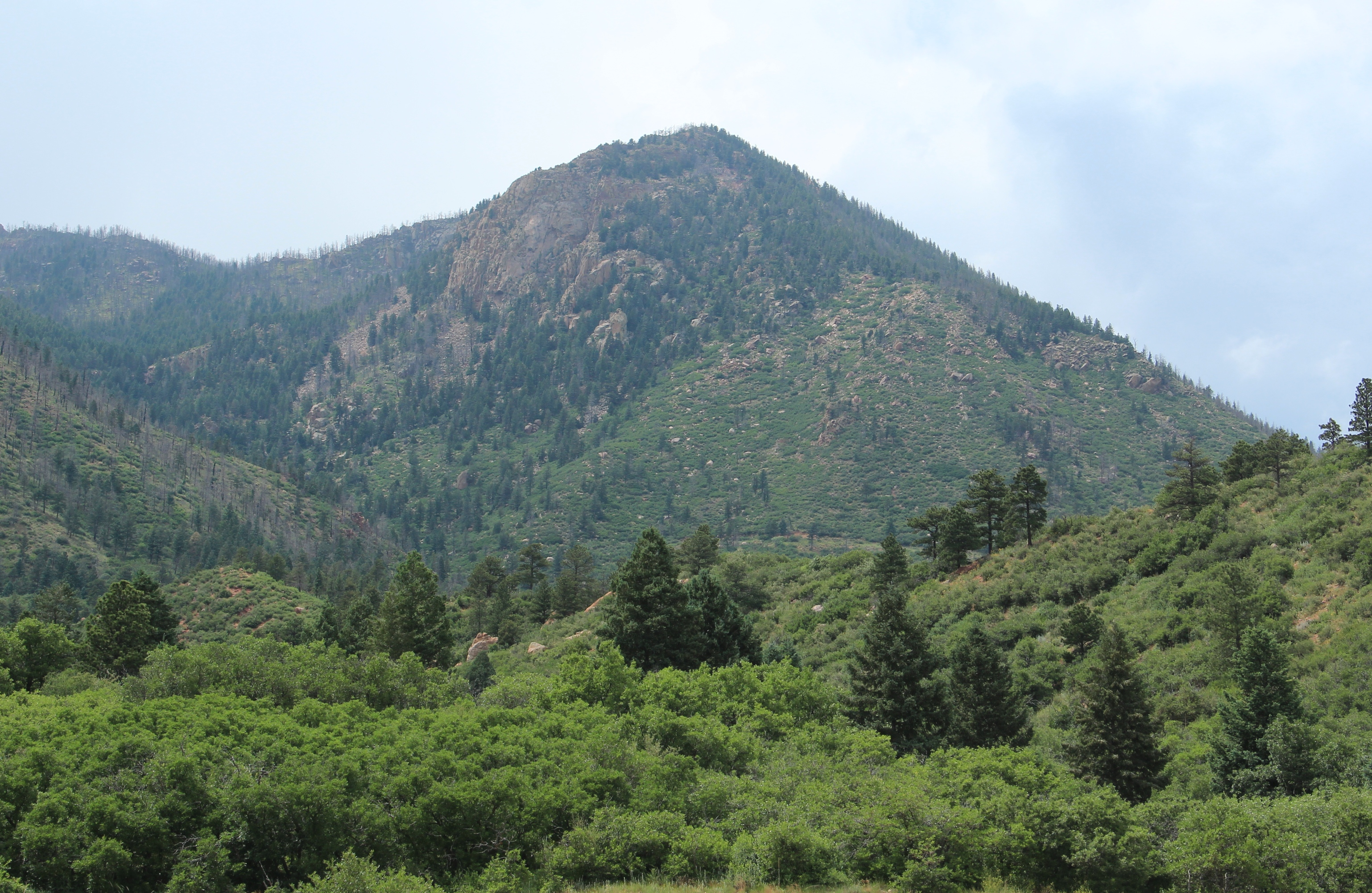
- Blodgett Peak seen from the Blodgett Peak Open Space

Highest point
- Elevation: 9,430 ft (2,870 m)
- Coordinates: 38°57′32″N 104°54′26″W

Geography
- Location within Colorado
- Location: 3898 W. Woodmen Road, Colorado Springs, El Paso County, Colorado, U.S.
- Parent range: Rampart Range
- Topo map(s): USGS 7.5' topographic map Cascade, Colorado

Blodgett Peak is located in El Paso County, Colorado. Blodgett Peak is located in Pike National Forest. and at its base is Blodgett Peak Open Space of Colorado Springs.

== Overview ==
The peak is located in the 167-acre Blodgett Peak Open Space along Rampart Range of the Rocky Mountains, which is a wildlife habitat, including the peregrine falcons, and trails for hiking. The terrain contains Pierre Shale, Fountain Formation, and Manitou Limestone. Flora includes scrub oak, Douglas fir, and ponderosa pine.

The peak is accessed from Woodmen Road in Colorado Springs. It is 10.1 miles (16.3 km) northwest by west (bearing 309°) of downtown Colorado Springs.

== Mountain ==
Blodgett Peak was named for a family that settled in an area now part of the Air Force Academy in the 19th century.

It was the 1959 runner-up site for the North American Aerospace Defense Command (NORAD) Hardened Combat Operations Center to the command center built in Cheyenne Mountain. NORAD was particularly interested in a Colorado Springs location, and the Corps of Engineers recommended the selection of Cheyenne Mountain in March 1959.

The Blodgett Peak was burned during the 2012 Waldo Canyon fire. After the fire, the Blodgett Peak Restoration Project was initiated to develop soil and erosion control measures, remove dead trees along trails, plant trees, and reseed vegetation. There was a combined effort of U.S. Forest Service crews, the Rocky Mountain Field Institute, Air Force Academy cadets, and the Mile High Youth Corp to restore the trails, remove hazardous trees, install log erosion barriers and other erosion minimization approaches, and plant trees and seeds. Funding was provided by Pikes Peak Community Foundation and Great Outdoors Colorado totaling $75,000 in addition to monies raised by McCloskey Motors. A tour of the open space, including the undamaged areas, was conducted by the City of Colorado Springs Parks, Recreation & Cultural Services on August 29, 2013, and the open space area was reopened. The open space was one of the first areas affected by the fire to reopen.

== Hiking ==
The main route, and the most accessible, starts in the Blodgett Peak Open Space and is approximately 5 mi (8 km) round trip. The hike gains 2,400 ft (730 m) in elevation, with the trailhead starting at 7,158 ft (2,182 m).

In March 2015, a man attempting to hike to the top of the peak was reported missing by relatives. After search teams were sent out, the man's body was found off of the trail among a boulder field. The trail is noted to be hard to navigate, especially since the Waldo Canyon Fire has changed the landscape and notable landmarks for hikers.

== See also ==
- List of Colorado mountain ranges
- List of Colorado mountain summits
  - List of Colorado fourteeners
  - List of Colorado 4000 meter prominent summits
  - List of the most prominent summits of Colorado
- List of Colorado county high points
