= Blevins Davis =

American dramatist

Charles Blevins Davis (May 26, 1903-July 16, 1971) was an American playwright and theatrical producer.

== Early life ==
Charles Blevins Davis, the only son of Charles A. Davis and his wife, was born on May 26, 1903 in Osceola, Missouri and grew up in Independence, Missouri. Davis grew up next to the Harry S. Truman family and was a lifelong friend and White House visitor of Harry, Bess and Margaret. He shortened his name to C. Blevins Davis.

== Education ==
Davis attended old Kansas City Junior College and, for a short time in the class of 1925 at Princeton University. He graduated from the University of Missouri in 1925. After teaching in Independence, Davis studied at Yale University..

== Career ==
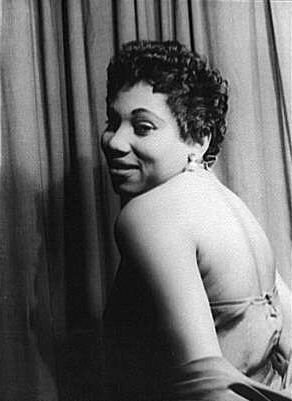
Leontyne Price as Bess

Davis returned to Independence and taught at the William Chrisman High School. He later worked at NBC in New York as the educational programs supervisor. By 1949, Davis was president of the Ballet Theater of New York. He was also a member of the American National Theater Association's board of directors. Davis produced Hamlet at the Elsinore Castle in Denmark. It was the first American production of the play in Denmark. He produced the 1952 touring revival of Porgy and Bess, which starred Cab Calloway, William Warfield, and Leontyne Price. The State Department sponsored the production in Madrid and Moscow.

Davis became owner of a weekly Cripple Creek, Colorado, newspaper in 1951. The Cripple Creek District Museum in Colorado was founded by Blevins Davis and Margaret Giddings in 1953. Due to financial obligations of more than $400,00, Davis sold his Glendale Farm in 1959.

== Personal life ==
In 1946, Davis married Marguerite Sawyer Hill, the widow of James N. Hill. Margaret was an art patron, socialite, and heiress to a railroad fortune. She owned Big Tree Farm in Glen Head, New York, on Long Island.

Margaret died at St. Luke's Hospital in Kansas City, Missouri, on March 18, 1948, of a heart attack. Davis received her nine-million-dollar fortune upon her death. He rebuilt and renovated his Glendale Farm in Independence. In 1949, Davis purchased the Claremont Estate in Colorado Springs, Colorado. The mansion, which he renamed Trianon, was sold to the Sisters of St. Francis Seraph in 1952. Woodmen Sanatorium, also in Colorado Springs, was purchased by Davis in July 1950. His wife, Marguerite Davis, a railroad heiress died in 1948 and wished to have her fortune used for charitable purposes. The Modern Woodmen Sanatorium property and Trianon were sold to the Poor Sisters of St. Francis (Sisters of St. Francis of Perpetual Adoration) for $1 in 1952. The combined fortune that they received was worth $2,325,000 (equivalent to $27,874,071 in 2025).

In the 1950s, Davis moved to Lima, Peru. While in London on a business trip, Davis died of a heart attack on July 16, 1971. He had no surviving children. His Princeton obituary stated that he lived a "colorful career" and spent $10 million during his "high-living days".
