= Bison Peak =

Mountain in the American state of Colorado

Bison Mountain
- Bison Peak
- Location within Colorado

Highest point
- Elevation: 12,432 ft (3,789 m)
- Prominence: 2,451 ft (747 m)
- Isolation: 18.23 mi (29.34 km)
- Listing: Colorado prominent summits Colorado range high points
- Coordinates: 39°14′18″N 105°29′52″W

Geography
- Location: Park County, Colorado, U.S.
- Parent range: Front Range, Highest summit of the Tarryall Mountains
- Topo map(s): USGS 7.5' topographic map McCurdy Mountain, Colorado

Bison Peak is the highest summit of the Tarryall Mountains range in the Rocky Mountains of North America. Officially designated Bison Mountain, the prominent 12,432-foot (3,789 m) peak is located in the Lost Creek Wilderness of Pike National Forest, 8.1 miles (13.1 km) north by west (bearing 352°) of the community of Tarryall in Park County, Colorado, United States. The summit is the highest point in the Lost Creek Wilderness.

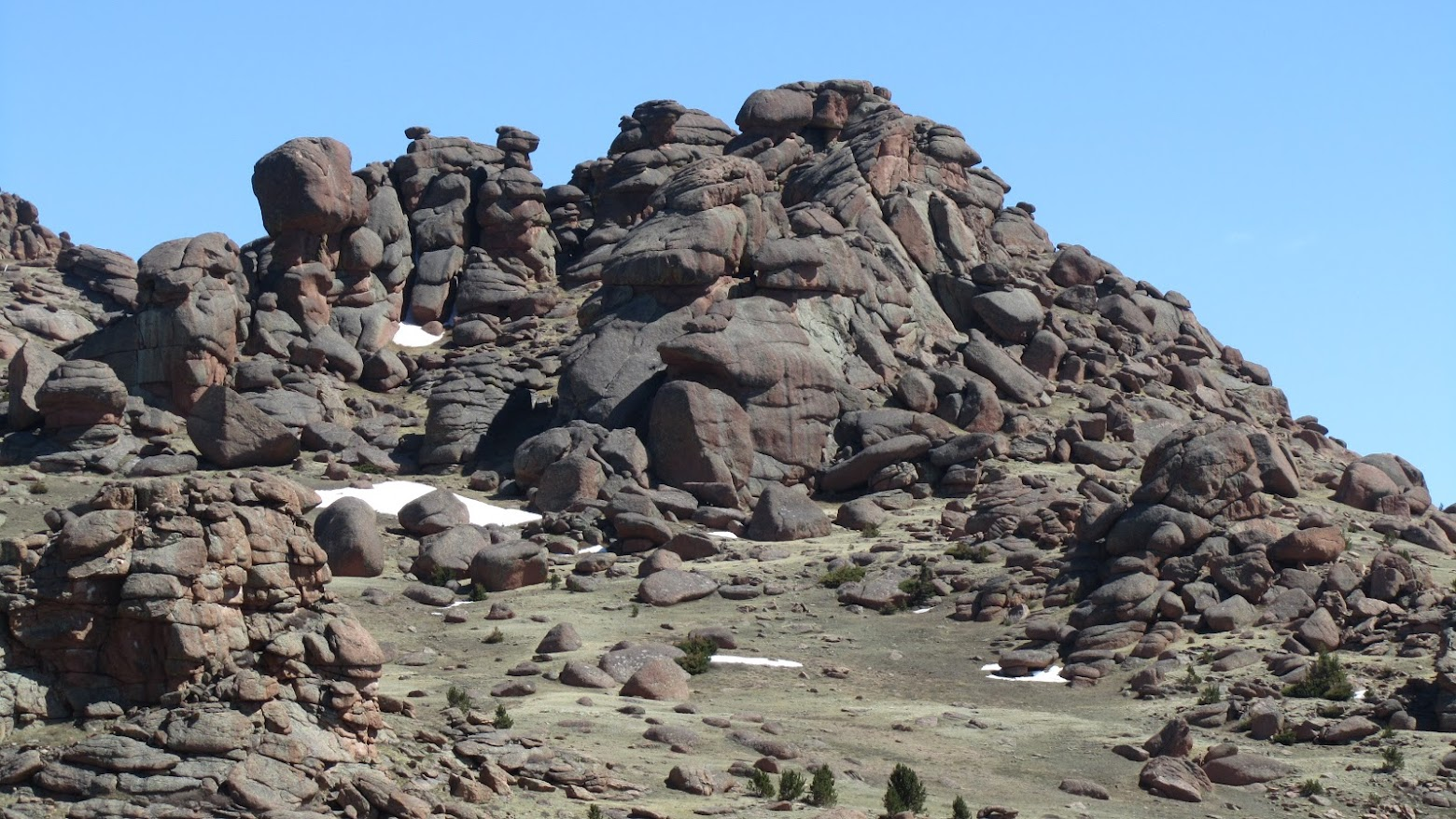
Rock Formations Near Summit of Bison Peak in Colorado

== Mountain ==
Bison Peak was so named because rock formations near the summit were said to resemble American bison.

== Historical names ==
- Bison Mountain
- Bison Peak

== See also ==
- List of Colorado mountain ranges
- List of Colorado mountain summits
  - List of Colorado fourteeners
  - List of Colorado 4000 meter prominent summits
  - List of the most prominent summits of Colorado
- List of Colorado county high points
