= Rampart Reservoir =

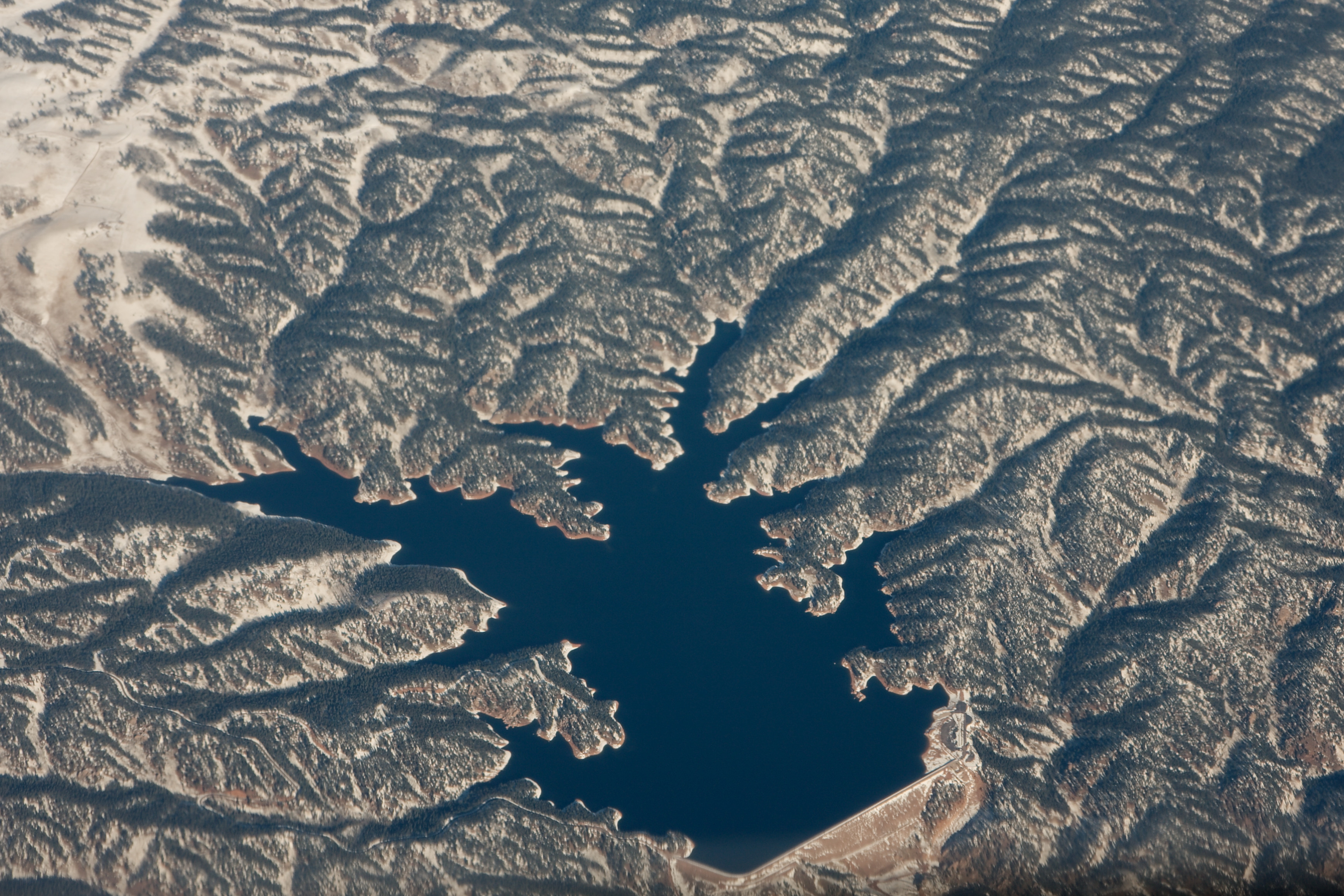
- Aerial view

- Location within Colorado Location within the United States
- Location: Pike National Forest, El Paso County, Colorado, United States
- Coordinates: 38°58′50.79″N 104°58′11.99″W
- Type: reservoir
- Primary inflows: West Monument Creek
- Primary outflows: West Monument Creek
- Basin countries: United States
- Surface area: 300 acres (120 hectares)
- Water volume: 41,000 acre-feet (51,000,000 cubic meters)
- Surface elevation: 9,006 feet (2,745 meters)
- Website: www.fs.usda.gov/r02/psicc/recreation

Rampart Reservoir is a reservoir 12 miles (19 kilometers) northwest of the city of Colorado Springs, Colorado in the Pike National Forest. The reservoir supplies the domestic drinking water for the city of Colorado Springs and serves as a recreation area for boaters, mountain bikers, and hikers.

The reservoir has been stocked with fish by Colorado Parks and Wildlife.

== Dam ==
The reservoir's construction began in the 1960s in response to the growing population of south-central Colorado and its increasing need for drinking water. The city of Colorado Springs voted in 1967 that the reservoir should be opened for public recreation after necessary facilities were built. The reservoir's earthen dam (NID no. CO00434) is 3,400 feet (1,000 meters) long and 230 feet (70 meters) high and was completed in 1970. The dam impounds West Monument Creek.

== History ==
Built by the City of Colorado Springs, the reservoir inundated an older one called Reservoir Number 5. Rampart Reservoir access was briefly limited after the September 11 attacks on the United States to protect drinking water supplies. The reservoir area was closed June 23, 2012 due to the Waldo Canyon fire; it was reopened for limited access on Friday, May 24, 2013.

== Hydroelectric power ==
The reservoir supplies water to the Tesla Hydroelectric Facility. Colorado Springs Utilities built and operates this hydroelectric power plant, which opened in 1997. Water from the reservoir flows down a shaft called the Stanley Tunnel and then into the turbines in a powerhouse located in the foothills west of the United States Air Force Academy. Given the reservoir's high altitude, the water arrives at the power plant at a high pressure.
