= Waldo Canyon Fire =

2012 forest fire in Colorado, US

- Part of the 2012 Colorado wildfires
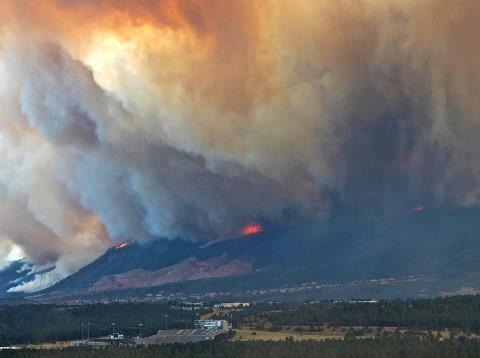
- The fire moving towards the Mountain Shadows area of Colorado Springs
- Date: June 23, 2012 – July 10, 2012
- Location: San Isabel National Forest, Colorado Springs, Colorado
- Coordinates: 38.89°N 104.872°W

Statistics
- Burned area: 18,247 acres (74 km^{2})

Impacts
- Deaths: 2
- Structures destroyed: 346

Map
- Location within Colorado

5 Day Timelapse - Waldo Canyon Fire - June 23–28, 2012

The Waldo Canyon fire was a forest fire that started approximately 4 miles (6.4 km) northwest of Colorado Springs, Colorado on June 23, 2012, and was declared 100 percent contained on July 10, 2012, after no smoke plumes were visible on a small portion of the containment line on Blodgett Peak. The fire was active in the Pike National Forest and adjoining areas, covering a total of 18,247 acres (29 sq mi; 74 km^{2}). The fire had caused the evacuation of over 32,000 residents of Colorado Springs, Manitou Springs and Woodland Park, several small mountain communities along the southwestern side of U.S. Highway 24, and partial evacuation of the United States Air Force Academy. There were 346 homes destroyed by the fire. U.S. Highway 24, a major east–west road, was closed in both directions. The Waldo Canyon Fire resulted in insurance claims totaling more than US $453.7 million. It was the most destructive fire in Colorado state history, as measured by the number of homes destroyed, until the Black Forest Fire surpassed it almost a year later when it consumed 486 homes and damaged 28 others.

== The fire ==
=== Beginning ===
The Waldo Canyon fire was first spotted noon on June 23, 2012 in a valley of Rampart Range in the Pike National Forest, about 3 miles (4.8 km) west of Colorado Springs and north of U.S. Highway 24, the major east-west highway from Colorado Springs. It likely started in the afternoon of June 22, 2012 when a report of the smell of smoke in the area was received by local agencies. Firefighters from the Pike National Forest as well as local agencies responded immediately but were unable to locate the source in very steep terrain before nightfall. The ground search resumed in early morning the following day. The initial smoke column was first spotted and caught on video by cyclists on the range, as the fire began to spread quickly, soon reaching one of the ridges. Air support was requested at 12:24 p.m. by the Colorado Springs Fire Department. Helicopters began dropping water on the fire within hours. Erratic winds caused the fire to spread rapidly in the northwest and south directions. By 3 p.m., the fire grew to 600 acres spreading towards the towns of Chipita Park, Green Mountain Falls, and Cascade, Colorado. It also spread towards the western and northwestern areas of the Colorado Springs area and Manitou Springs. Residents began to evacuate as the fire intensified. Planes dropped retardant slurry on what they believed was the Pyramid Mountain Fire, which was a less than 20 acre fire in the same area the night before. As the fire intensified, flames seemed to reach 150 feet above the treetops.

Numerous fire resources, including multiple ground crews, helicopters, and seventy fire trucks were called in, a staging area for firefighters was established, and the CSFD mobile command unit was activated. The city's emergency operations center was opened. The city also asked fire departments from Stratmoor Hills, Cheyenne Mountain Air Force Station, Cimarron Hills and Peterson Air Force Base to fill four city stations. Three more were left empty. Ground crews, including Colorado Springs Utilities' Catamount Wildland Fire Team and multiple other agencies, began to cut a firebreak above Cedar Heights, an effort that would continue in the following days.

US Highway 24 was closed at 31st Street and through Ute Pass on June 24. By that day, eleven thousand people had evacuated their homes and shelters were set up for evacuees in Colorado Springs and Woodland Park. The Norris-Penrose Equestrian Center provided shelter for evacuated horses including those from the Academy Riding Stables in Garden of the Gods, Flying W Ranch, Dreamcatchers Equine Rescue, and Rock Ledge Ranch.

=== Intensification ===
The fire crossed Rampart Range Road on June 25 when a flaming deer leaped across the road. The fire spread quickly into Queens Canyon due to the dry terrain, hot conditions, and steep topography, which made it difficult for fire fighters to manage the fire. Around noon, two C-130 aircraft from the 302d Airlift Wing at nearby Peterson Air Force Base and two from the 153d Airlift Wing in Wyoming were made available for their first air dump of retardant near the Queens Canyon area.

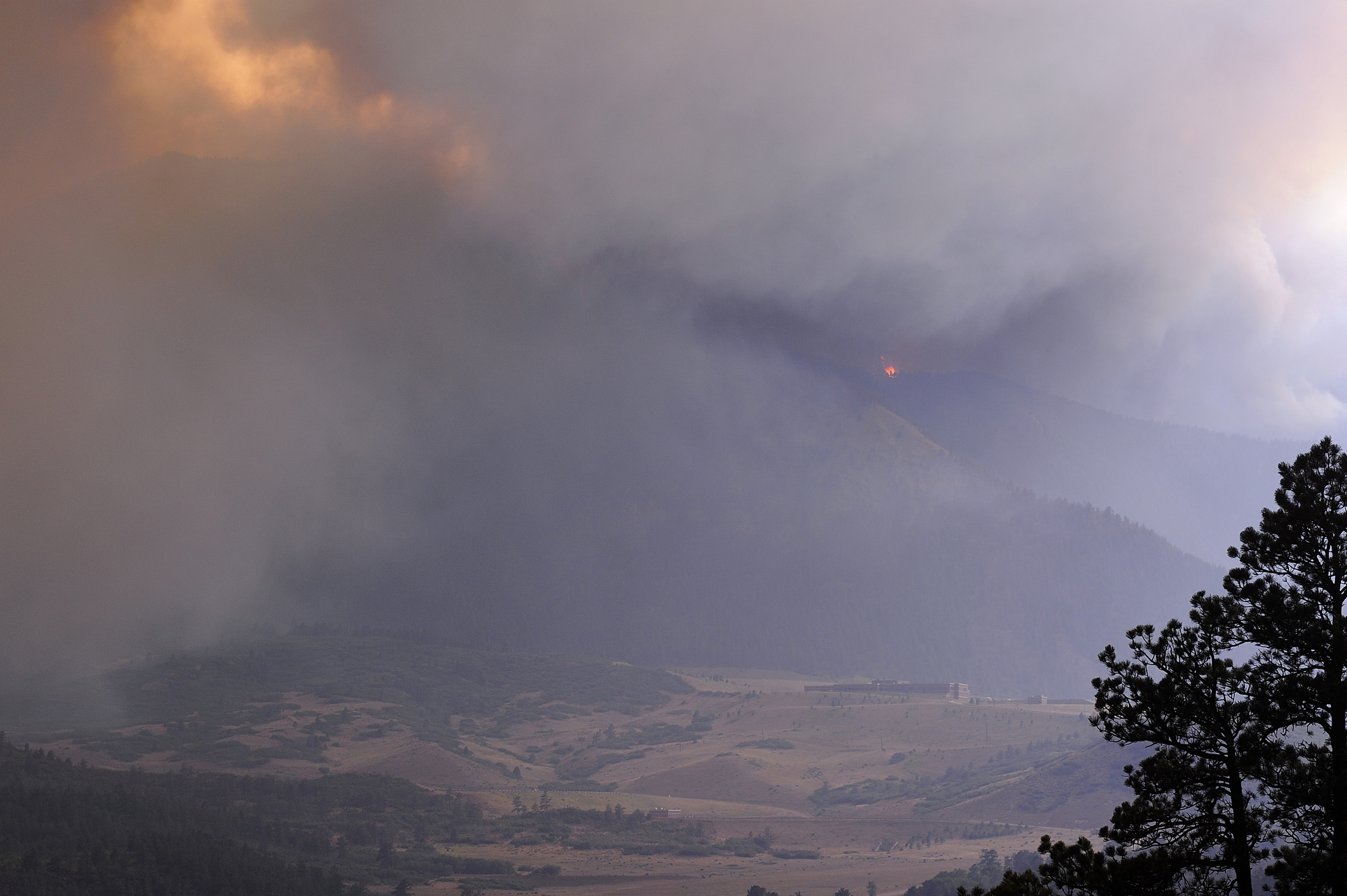
Smoke cloud from the Waldo Canyon fire on June 26, 2012

On June 26, 2012, Colorado Springs experienced a record high temperature of 101 °F (38 °C), which aided the fire's rapid expansion through Queen's Canyon and creating significant smoke. The fire crested Queen's Canyon and winds from the west nearing 65 mph gusts (the cyclonic winds of the collapsing pyrocumulus cloud from the fire storm) pushed the fire down the slope and into the Mountain Shadows, Oak Valley Ranch, and Peregrine neighborhoods. The fire moved about 2 miles per hour towards the city. Embers were carried by the wind to a distance of up to a quarter mile away and caused multiple small spot fires of brush and low vegetation. Once the fire crossed into neighborhoods, the fuel for the fire was houses, and the fire spread house-to-house.

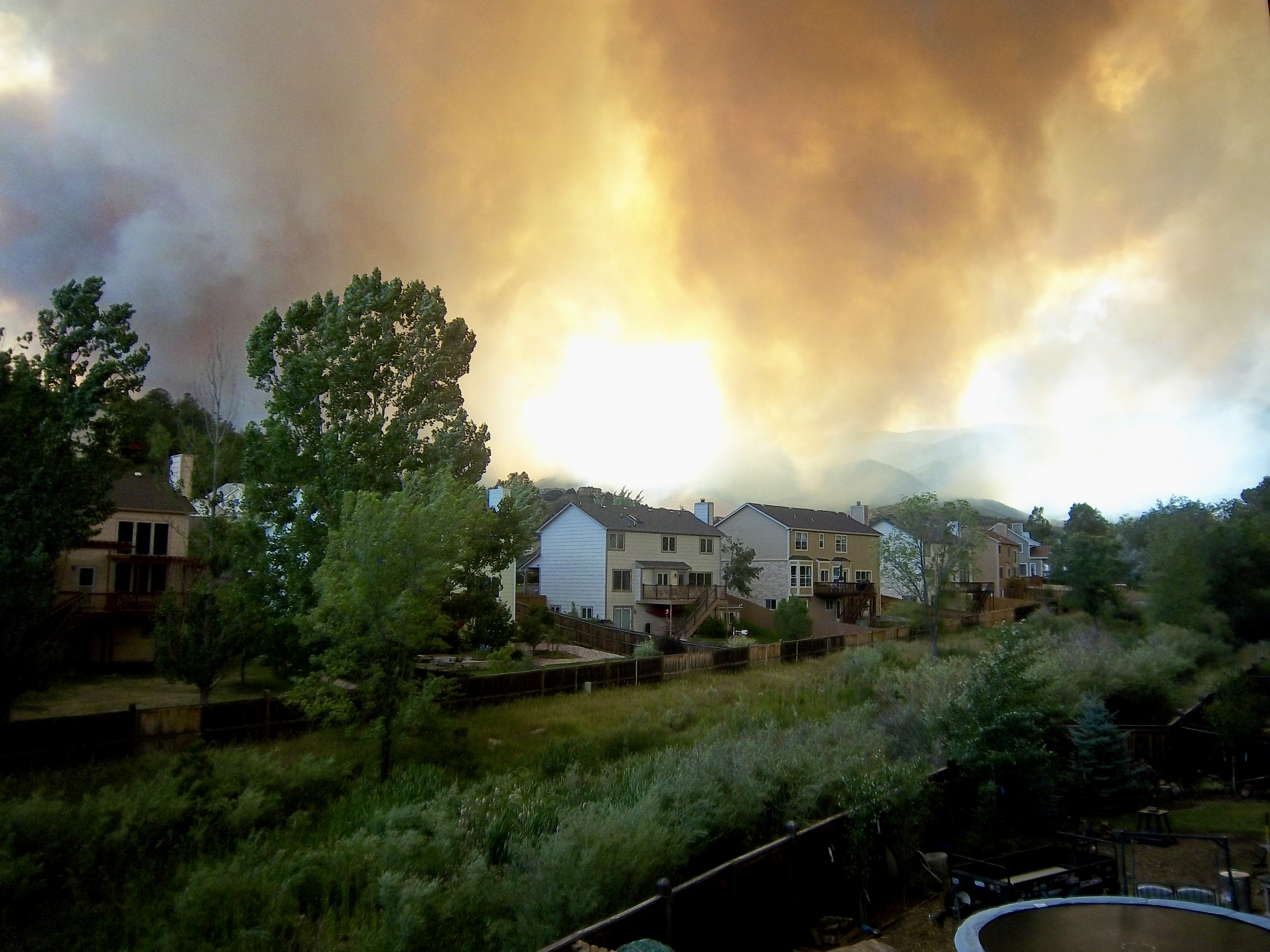
Smoke rising from the Waldo Canyon Fire on June 26, 2012, as viewed from the Rockrimmon neighborhood, at the moment mandatory evacuations were ordered for all of northwestern Colorado Springs.

By late afternoon and evening, multiple structures were burned including the Flying W Ranch, a Colorado Springs landmark built in 1953. Within the time span of twelve hours, 346 homes in western Colorado Springs had burned to the ground, and hundreds more were reported as damaged by fire and smoke. (Note: In March, 2013, the Flying W Ranch announced that it would have a grand reopening by late June after a temporary outdoor pavilion was built. It planned to operate on a limited basis, 3 days a week, and resume operating on a normal basis in the summer of 2014, when the lost buildings were rebuilt.) The fire, though, generally went out where fire-mitigation efforts had been implemented, such as homes in the Cedar Heights area. In 2001, fire mitigation efforts were implemented by the city's fire department and area residents for houses with the highest risk of fire damage.

By June 27, businesses—such as call centers, data centers, and data research centers—and 30,000 or more people had been evacuated. The Colorado Veterinary Medical Reserve Corps tended to animals that were affected by the evacuated, subject to smoke-related symptoms, or anxiety due to the natural flight reflex to get away from the smoke.

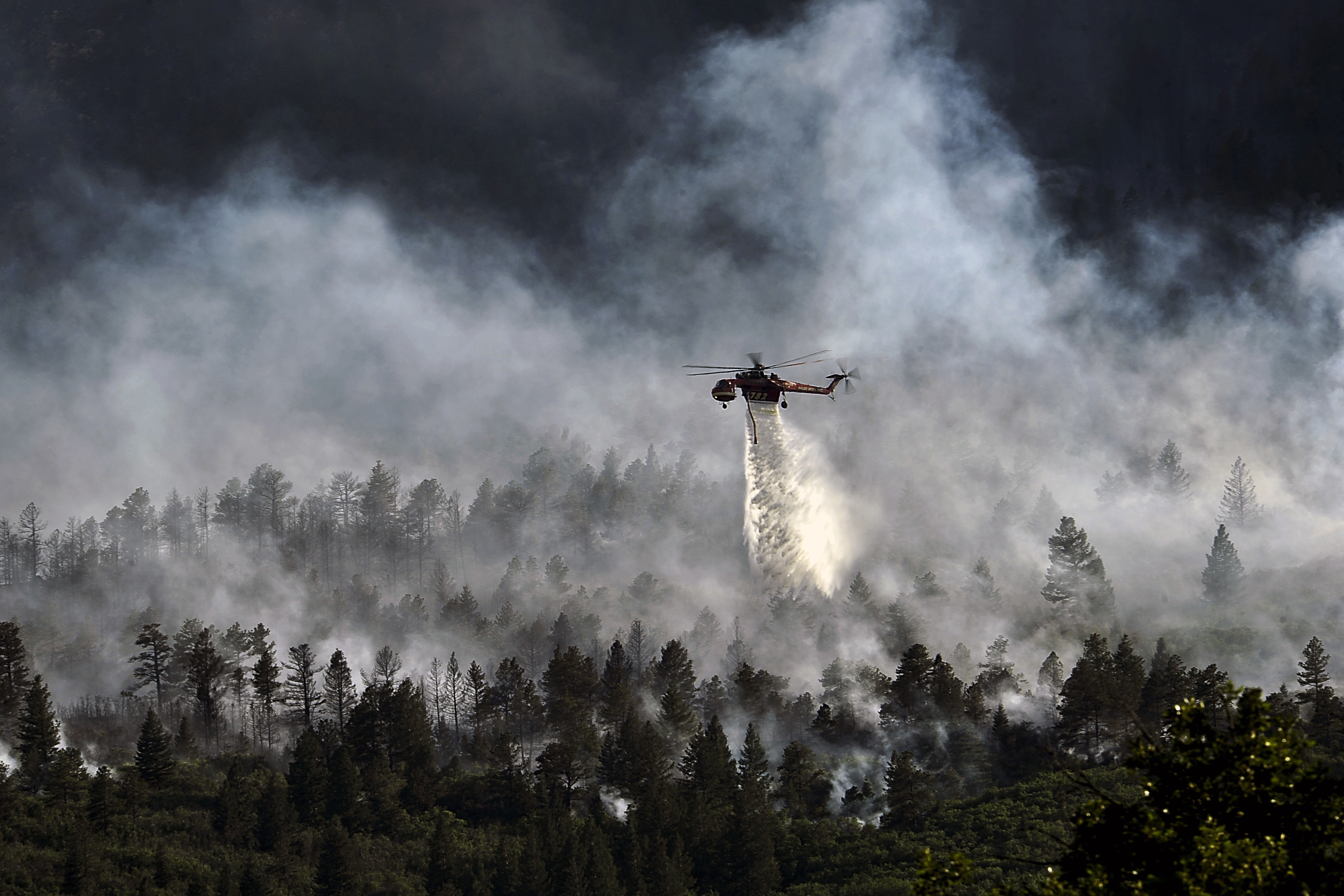
Helicopter dropping water on the fire

A firefighter with the Denver Fire Department and a US Geological Survey (USGS) aerial survey team estimated by photographic topography that 300 or more homes had burned to the ground on June 27. The fire threatened to spread to Crystola and parts of Woodland Park in Teller County.

The specialized Vandenberg Air Force Base Hot Shots team arrived in Colorado Springs and helped limit what could have been significant eastward movement of the fire. Fire fighters were affected by fatigue and injuries. One Company Officer expressed "safety concerns" after he worked a 36-hour shift. Six firefighters suffered minor injuries, and 52 firefighters were sent home due to fatigue. At the height of the fire, 1,500 firefighters stayed at the Holmes Middle School campus. Some days, more than 300 grateful people lined up to welcome them back after their shifts.

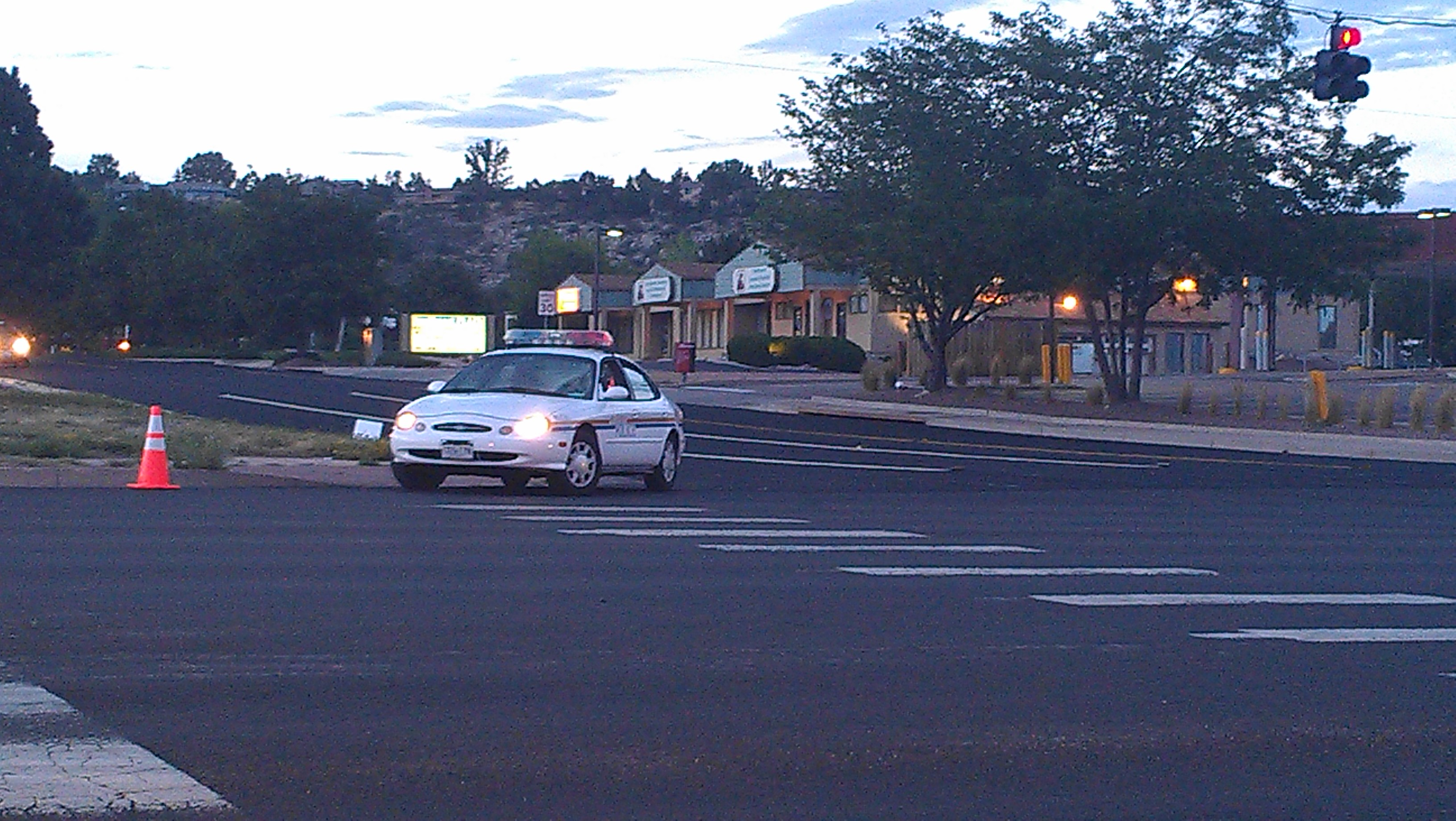
Aurora (Colorado) Police Department helping CSPD evacuation lines in Colorado Springs on June 28, 2012

The Pikes Peak Community Foundation created The Waldo Canyon Fire Fighter's Fund on June 28 to support the efforts of public and volunteer fire departments in El Paso and Teller Counties. This fund provided financial resources for the fire departments for food, cots, firefighting equipment, or future wildfire mitigation efforts in the Pikes Peak region.

During a two-and-a-half hour visit on June 29, President Barack Obama toured the Mountain Shadows neighborhood, thanked Fire Station 9 firefighters, and visited the American Red Cross evacuation shelter at Southeast YMCA Family Center.

Memorial Health System (MHS) emergency room physicians and nurses treated adults and children with breathing problems from the heavy smoke in the area. University of Colorado Health (UCHealth) and Children's Hospital Colorado in Aurora offered donations, supplies and medical staff to assist in treating patients. Volunteers also assisted in the City of Colorado Springs’ emergency command center. William Everett, a 74-year-old Vietnam veteran, and his wife, 73-year-old Barbara, died from "thermal injuries and smoke inhalation" as they were in the process of evacuating their house when the home caught fire.

On Sunday, July 1, firefighters were able to contain 55 percent of the fire, but the city still remained under a red flag warning throughout the day. Most of the 35,000 people displaced by the Waldo Canyon fire were allowed to return to their homes, despite continued risk of fire damage to their homes, theft of their homes' contents, or bears. About 3,000 residents remained under evacuation orders.

Mandatory evacuations in some areas of Northwestern Colorado Springs were expected to be lifted by evening. More than $85,000 was raised at the televised "A Community Rises" benefit concert was held July 4 at the Colorado Springs World Arena from attendees, the World Arena, and Colorado Springs Philharmonic. Online donations through Pikes Peak United Way increased the total to $288,807.00. Other grants, including $125,000 from El Pomar Foundation, brought the final number to well over $500,000. The benefit was organized by the Philharmonic, World Arena, Colorado Springs Independent, Focus on the Family, Pikes Peak United Way and other media.

=== Containment ===
As of Thursday, July 5, the fire was at 90 percent containment, with 776 personnel working the fire (fewer people than the day before). Thirty-seven homes that were evacuated were by now reported to have been burglarized, and authorities were offering up to $50,000 for information on the culprits. In addition, 28 vehicles, many packed with evacuee's belongings, also were broken into after residents fled the fire. The National Guard was summoned to secure and help protect properties within the evacuated areas. On July 10, 2012, the fire was 100 percent contained.

=== Damage ===
The Waldo Canyon Fire left two people dead, destroyed some 346 homes and burned 18,247 acres (28.511 sq mi) in the Pike National Forest and in Colorado Springs. Of the total acres burned in the fire, 14,422 acres (22.534 sq mi) were National Forest land, 3,678 acres (5.747 sq mi) were private land, and 147 acres (0.230 sq mi) were Department of Defense land. These lands spanned five major watersheds within the Pike National Forest, including those of Headwater Fountain Creek, Cascade Creek-Fountain Creek, Garden of the Gods, West Monument Creek, and Lower Monument Creek. The fire spread through Ute Pass, parts of Teller County, and came within 1.5 miles (2.4 km) of Woodland Park's city limit.

The Burned Area Emergency Response (BAER) assessment team say that 3,375 acres (13,660,000 m^{2}) were burned so severely that the vegetation and roots below a depth of about four inches were gone. The team said that the landscape looked like that of the moon. The team was concerned that increased flooding in the area of the fire scar could lead to mudslides along roads and into neighborhoods. "What ends up happening is big boulders, trees, all these burnt trees can fall over, get in these drainages, move downhill very quickly and then cause debris dams and then cause roads to fail and perhaps failures onto Highway 24 or into neighborhoods... this will continue to impact this area absolutely for at least 10 years. Those who live near the burn area need to stay alert and be prepared."

El Paso County published a "Relief and Recovery Assistance Guide" to connect residents with disaster assistance and information.

=== Investigation ===
The United States Forest Service was responsible for the investigation, but the Federal Bureau of Investigation (FBI) also became involved to determine the cause of the fire. The origin of the fire was located on July 5, 2012, and as of June 2014, the cause was determined to be caused by a human, but the true nature of the cause remains unknown.

== Erosion and flood control remediation ==
The burn area is in greater danger of flooding when flood waters travel down the six waterways, picking up sediment and other debris that have the potential to cause massive damage to homes, bridges, culverts and streets in Colorado Springs, Manitou Springs, Ute Pass — and even farther downstream. To mitigate possible damage, the Forest Service cleaned culverts, removed sediment, installed warning signs and more, at a cost of about $5 million. Colorado Springs Utilities spent about $8.2 million to fix a damaged pipeline and access road near West Monument Creek, add sediment catchment basins at Flying W Ranch and at Glen Eyrie, and planned to construct a debris fence, temporary floodwall and auxiliary spillway at the Alpine Autism Center. About $6 million in projects for the city include build sediment ponds built by Air Force Academy cadets and volunteers along the slopes of Blodgett Peak Open Space. Aerial mulching for emergency stabilization via helicopters treated 3,038 acres with AgStraw and over 8,000 tons of Woodshred mulch by September. CDOT and El Paso County have focused on the Highway 24 area, working to secure slopes along the route and improve drainage. CDOT's long-term improvements, which began in 2013, included a concrete retaining wall to manage debris flow and replacing 18-inch drainage pipes with pipes at least twice as large. The county plans to add a basin to catch sediment and debris upstream of Rainbow Falls, with work beginning late 2013. Manitou Springs doubled the size of two storm drains to handle the flow from Williams Canyon Creek, purchased three early-warning sirens, and removed trees from Fountain Creek that were catching debris.

== Rebuilding ==
=== Communities ===
The Rocky Mountain Insurance Information Association estimated the cost of insured losses in the Waldo Canyon Fire at $453.7 million in June 2012. (Note: The Rocky Mountain Insurance Information Association estimated the cost of insured losses in the Waldo Canyon Fire at $352.6 million on July 17, 2012.) In August 2012, the city of Colorado Springs published the Recovery Resource Guide to assist residents in rebuilding the community, which occurred slowly and began with removal of debris. A nonprofit organization, Colorado Springs Together, was formed to help remove debris and rebuild homes.

As of early June 2013, 347 debris removal/wrecking permits had been issued and that work had been completed on 332 structures. Some 185 new home permits had been issued and 63 of those were completed. As people returned to their homes and began rebuilding, some found that copper hardware or other items had been stolen from their homes. (Note: In mid-April Colorado Springs police arrested a man suspected of stealing more than $200,000 in copper hardware from seven homes under construction, including several homes being rebuilt in the Mountain Shadows subdivision after they were destroyed during the Waldo Canyon wildfire. He was caught after having been under surveillance. The man and a woman were also convicted in mid-May 2013 of methamphetamine possession and identity theft, among other charges. They received sentences of 48 and 72 years in prison, respectively under Colorado’s "habitual offender" laws.) In June 2014, almost 250 houses had been built to replace the 347 houses that had been destroyed by the fire. In the Mountain Shadows neighborhood, 77% of the houses were rebuilt, on average 13.8% larger than their original homes. Many of the residents have implemented fire mitigation plans, although building larger homes makes more fuel for fires. Those that didn't rebuild have put up their lots for sale.

Over 450 houses that survived the actual fire demonstrated in the following months hidden damage due to exposure to high temperatures (up to 2,000 degrees F), ash or embers, and corrosive particulate infiltration. Disgruntled about the fire and unable to get insurance company to pay their claims, nearly 50 families from the Mountain Shadows, Peregrine and Rockrimmon neighborhoods formed the Waldo Canyon Fire Victims Association, the later group was renamed the Catastrophic Insurance Complaints in Colorado Association. They met with elected officials, including Mayor Steve Bach in early January, 2013 to reduce the bureaucratic processes. Some of the homeowners said they wouldn't get full payment from their insurance companies until they have rebuilt their homes or replaced damaged property, which they must do by June 26, 2013, one year after the fire.

The Waldo Canyon Fire Assistance Fund of $940,299.93 was given to twenty local non-profit groups by January 2013. The funds were given out in the form of grants approved by an advisory committee made up of people with emergency response experience and a victim of the fire. The fund was established with a seed grant of $125,000 from El Pomar Foundation and donations from the community.

The Colorado Springs Pioneers Museum staff recognized the historical significance of the fire and asked for residents to tell their stories and collected artifacts from the fire. The exhibit called From the Ashes: The Waldo Canyon Fire debuted on June 22, 2013. Officials from all the impacted districts said returning to a consistent and predictable schedule and school activities would help staff and students alike find normalcy and move on. (Note: School District 11 officials have contacted families whose homes were destroyed and to let them know that they can contact the Title 1 office for schooling changes for their children, including transportation, choosing another school in the district. At least five families at Air Academy High School lost their home, and the school was working to replace school-related items.)

Businesses that rely on tourism were affected by the 2012 fire, losing up to 50% of their revenue for that year. Low interest loans through the Colorado Enterprise Fund were offered to small businesses who lost business due to the fire. Businesses could receive loans up to $10,000 with a zero percent interest rate for twelve months and then 12 percent interest after that. There were also opportunities for support for organizations that were members of the Colorado Springs Business Alliance.

=== National Forest Service ===
In May 2013, the U.S. Forest Service reopened about a third of the forest land affected by the fire, including Rampart Reservoir, neighboring campgrounds and trails, and some other areas hit by last year's Waldo Canyon fire. Rampart Reservoir is also used for fishing and boating. Closed areas include areas south of the reservoir; Waldo Canyon, Williams Canyon and Blodgett Peak trails, the trail to Nichols Reservoir, and other trails that enter steeper, more severely burned areas.

The United States Forest Service and Colorado Parks and Wildlife reported in February 2015 that there does not seem to be a lasting negative effect of wildlife in the area of the Waldo Canyon fire. Big horn sheep appear to have gotten out of the way of the fire to not have a loss in life and are thriving in the bigger open spaces left by the fire. Within days of the fire, animals began to return to the area. Within a month of the fire, aspens began to sprout in the burn scar area.

== Assessment ==
The city released a 34-page self-assessment Initial After Action Report on October 23, 2012. It includes some information about the hot weather, dry fuel, and erratic nature of the fire. By this time, the International Association of Fire Fighters Local 5 had presented the Colorado Springs Fire Department (CSFD) Chief with a list of 15 concerns and recommendations for future events. The Colorado Springs Independent released results of its own five-month investigation on December 12, 2012, in part based on duty reports filed by Colorado Springs Fire Department firefighters who worked this fire. It found that there were times when firefighters were unclear of what they should be doing and unable to reach someone via command; that there was poor planning, notification, and staffing for the northwest Colorado Springs neighborhoods evacuation and firefighting resources; and that the city's damage would have been much more significant without the firefighting equipment and crews.

On February 7, 2013, the city of Woodland Park issued its own After Action Report, with an analysis of the city's strengths and recommendations. There were three top logistical recommendations, including mapping during evacuation notification phases, and evacuation validation marking system, and provisions to increase staffing at the City Hall to manage incoming calls.

A two-year study of the Waldo Canyon Fire burn site began February 2013 with engineers and scientists from the National Institute of Standards and Technology (NIST) at the request of U.S. Senators Michael Bennett and Mark Udall. The NIST is being aided by input from the U.S. Forest Service, Colorado Springs firefighters, and use of the city's existing three-dimensional imaging of the Mountain Shadows area. Colorado Springs was partially chosen for the city's programs and building codes to manage fire risk.

On March 27, the Fire Adapted Communities Coalition released a 48-page report about the success of the areas that had been a part of a ten-year ongoing fire mitigation program. (Note: Officials from Germany, Australia, New Zealand and California have contacted the city in years past for its wildland program. And nine officials from a Russian fire agency came to observe the city's mitigation efforts—arriving, ironically, just as Waldo broke out.) On April 3, 2013, the City of Colorado Springs released its 111-page Final After Action Report to evaluate the effectiveness of the response to the fire and determine any actionable items for the future. Recommendations included training and improvement in real-time documentation, logistics, incident management, and internal and partner agency communications. On April 19, the El Paso County Sheriff's Office released its 26-page After Action Report. (Note: On June 23, 2012, a dispatcher failed to forward original witness information to the sheriff's fire center and was later reprimanded for her violation. Her mistake remains a good lesson in the perils of complacency, as noted by Sheriff Terry Maketa.)

The state Forest Service and Colorado State University completed a study in 2013 that found that about 20% of Colorado's population and 25% of Colorado homes are in a "red zone", or a place with high likelihood of fires. El Paso County is one of the top three counties for fire danger with 45% of its residents within a red zone. (Note: Approximately 45 percent of the population of El Paso County, or about 278,000 people, live in a fire danger zone. About 20,000 people and about 7,000 homes are located in the Black Forest Fire evacuation zone. Census data shows that half of those homes were built in the last decade. The Colorado Springs Briargate subdivision, just south of Black Forest, is certain to be exposed to fire in the future. Houses built in the forests are particularly in danger of fires.) Colorado has seen a 300 percent increase in wildfires between 2003 and 2013.

== See also ==
- 2012 Colorado wildfires
  - High Park fire, a concurrent wildfire west of Fort Collins, Colorado
  - Flagstaff fire, a concurrent wildfire southwest of Boulder, Colorado
- The Hayman Fire, of 2002
- Black Forest Fire of 2013 (Note: Waldo Canyon fire evacuees hosted a free lunch picnic for Black Forest fire evacuees on June 17 at Woodstone Park in Rockrimmon. Area businesses including Salsa Brava, Old Chicago, TGI Friday's, Outback Steakhouse, Starbucks, Whole Foods and Oliver's Deli - some of which had to evacuate during last summer's wildfire - donated a banquet of Italian, Mexican and American food.)
