= Lost Creek Wilderness =

Protected wilderness area in the U.S. state of Colorado

- IUCN category Ib (wilderness area)
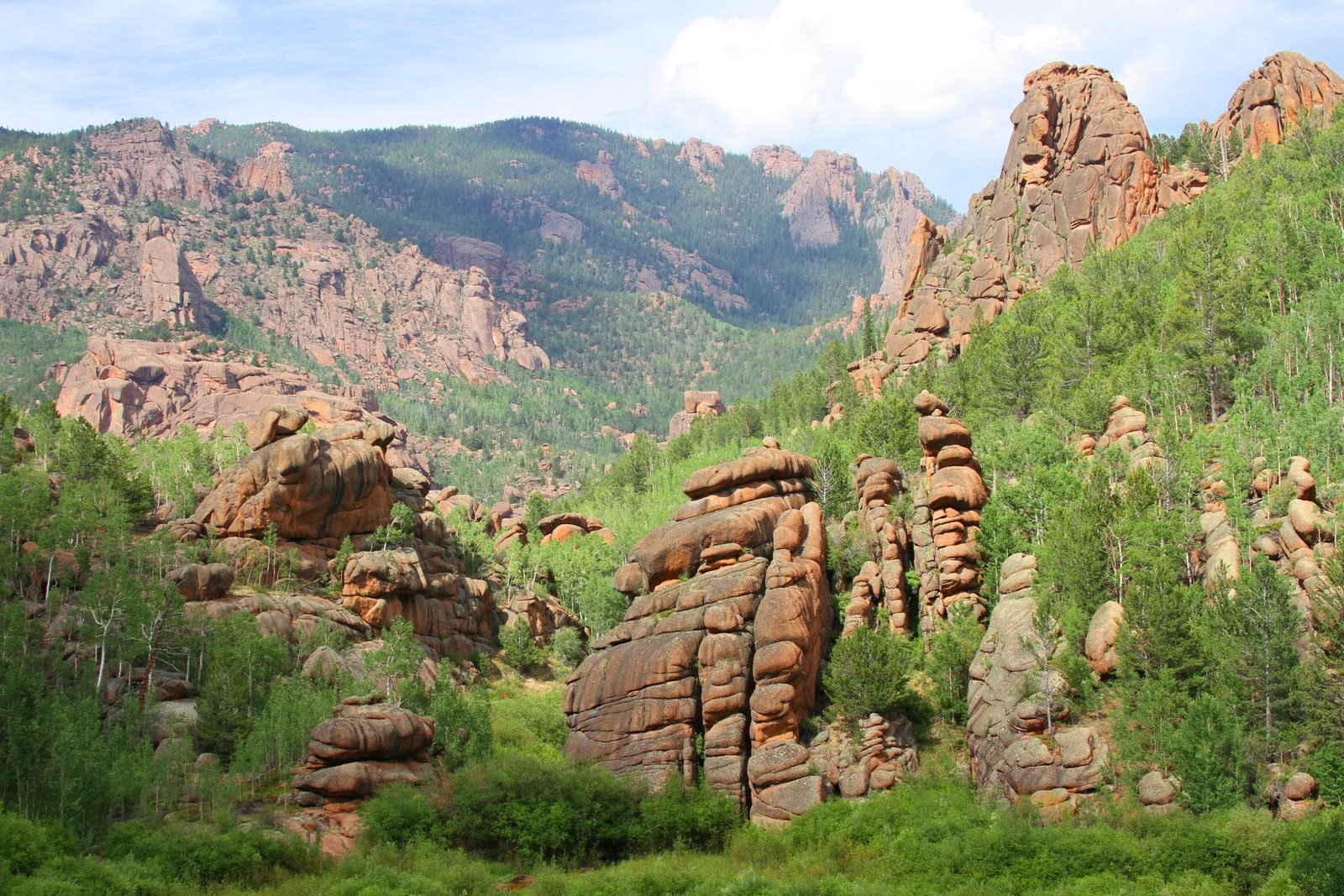
- Lost Creek Wilderness

- Location within the United States
- Location: Park / Jefferson counties, Colorado, USA
- Nearest city: Denver, Colorado
- Coordinates: 39°16′7″N 105°28′5″W
- Area: 119,790 acres (484.8 km^{2})
- Established: January 1, 1980
- Governing body: U.S. Forest Service

The Lost Creek Wilderness is a 119,790-acre (485 km^{2}) wilderness area located in central Colorado in Jefferson and Park counties, south of the town of Bailey. The area is situated entirely within the boundaries of the Pike National Forest.

The Lost Creek Scenic Area is a 16,798-acre National Natural Landmark within the Wilderness.

== Wilderness ==
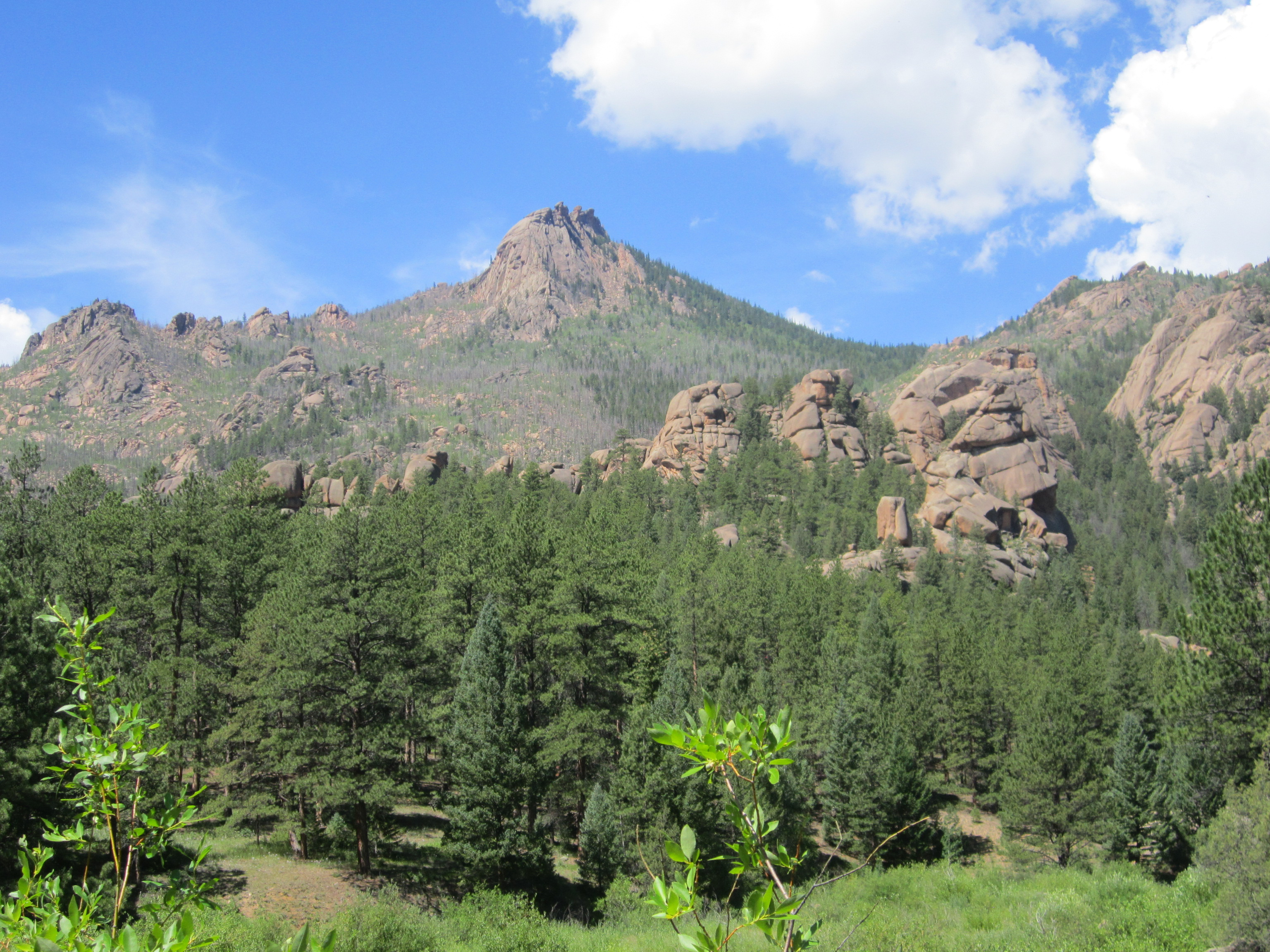
Granite rock formations define the wilderness

The area is named for Lost Creek, a perennial stream that disappears and reappears before finally joining Goose Creek, which empties into the South Platte River at Cheesman Reservoir just east of the Wilderness area. The entire water system of the area forms a watershed for the Platte River Basin. The area is notable for its many rock formations, natural arches, and rounded granite domes and knobs. These are contained in two ranges of low alpine foothills of the Rocky Mountains: the Kenosha Mountains and the Tarryall Mountains. 12,431-foot (3,789 m) Bison Peak is the highest peak in the wilderness.

Because of its proximity to Denver, the area is quite popular for outdoor recreation in both the summer and winter months. Common activities in the area include hiking, backpacking, and rock climbing, as well as cross-country skiing, snowshoeing, and winter camping. There are 130 miles (210 km) of trails in the wilderness, including a section of the Colorado Trail that crosses Lost Creek then parallels the northeast boundary toward Kenosha Pass.

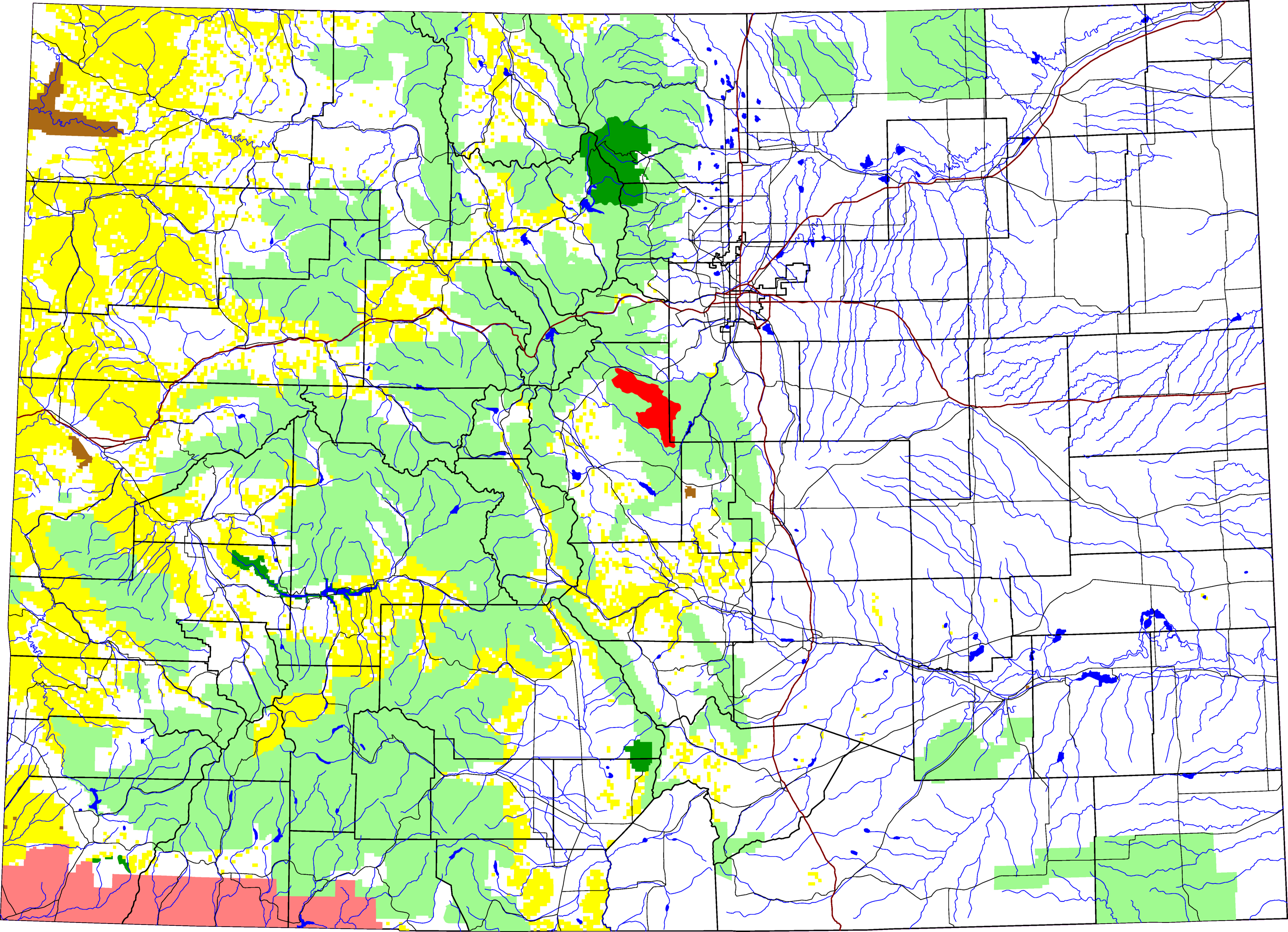
Colorado with Lost Creek Wilderness in red

Lost Park, as the area is sometimes called, was one of the last refuges of the American bison in the United States.

== Scenic area ==
The Lost Creek Scenic Area is a 16,798-acre (67.98 km^{2}) (Note: Wilderness.net says that the scenic area is 15,120 acres.) site within the Lost Creek Wilderness that was created in 1963 under the 1939 "U-Regulations", which was the precursor of the Wilderness Act. The area was designated a National Natural Landmark in 1966. It is located in the Pike National Forest and is in both Park and Jefferson counties. Rock formations with pinnacles and spires are located in narrow gorges and on ridges. An underground stream "disappears and reappears" nine times or more at the site.

== In popular culture ==
Episode 2 of Season 1 of the television series Supernatural takes place within the Lost Creek Wilderness area, specifically at the fictitious Blackwater Ridge.
