= Pike National Forest =

Forest in Colorado, United States

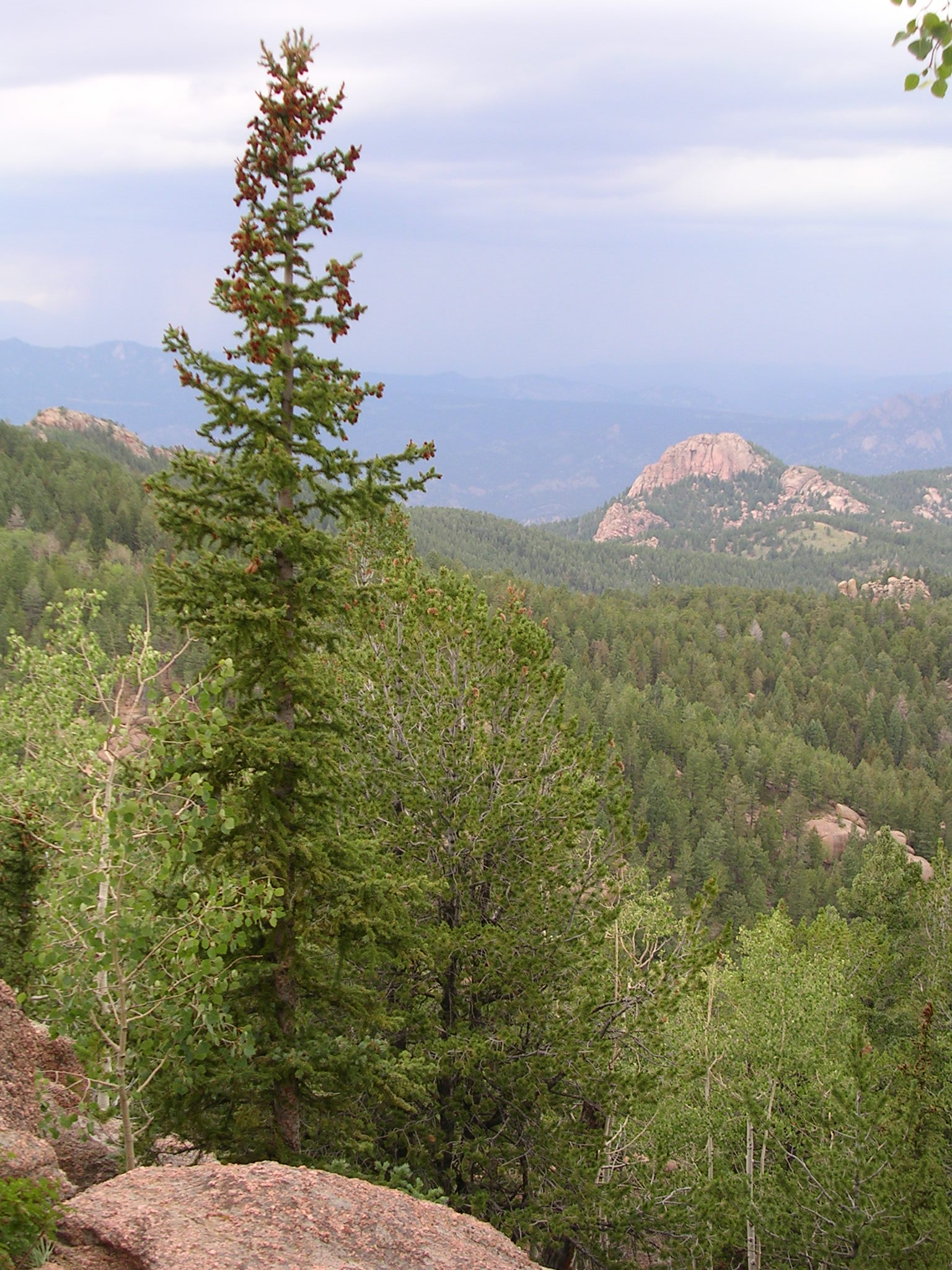
- Near Devil's Head Lookout

- Location within the United States
- Location: Clear Creek, Douglas, El Paso, Jefferson, Park, and Teller counties, Colorado, United States
- Nearest city: Colorado Springs, Colorado
- Coordinates: 39°11′N 105°19′W
- Area: 1,106,604 acres (4,478.27 km^{2})
- Established: February 1892
- Governing body: U.S. Forest Service
- Website: Pike and San Isabel National Forests & Cimarron and Comanche National Grasslands

The Pike National Forest is located in the Front Range of Colorado, United States, west of Colorado Springs including Pikes Peak. The forest encompasses 1,106,604 acres (4,478 km^{2}) within Clear Creek, Teller, Park, Jefferson, Douglas and El Paso counties. The major rivers draining the forest are the South Platte and Fountain Creek. Rampart Reservoir is a large artificial body of water located within the forest.

The forest is named after American explorer Zebulon Pike.

Much of the bedrock within Pike National Forest is made up of the coarse, pink to orange Pikes Peak granite.

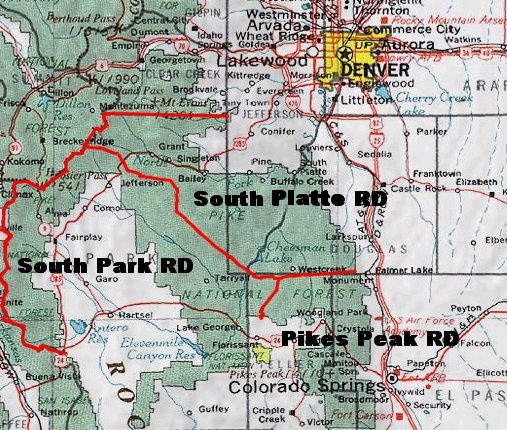
Pike National Forest map

== Administration ==
Pike National Forest is managed in association with San Isabel National Forest and Comanche National Grassland in Colorado, as well as Cimarron National Grassland in Kansas and is headquartered in Pueblo, Colorado. There are local ranger district offices located in Colorado Springs, Fairplay and Morrison.

== Forest fires ==
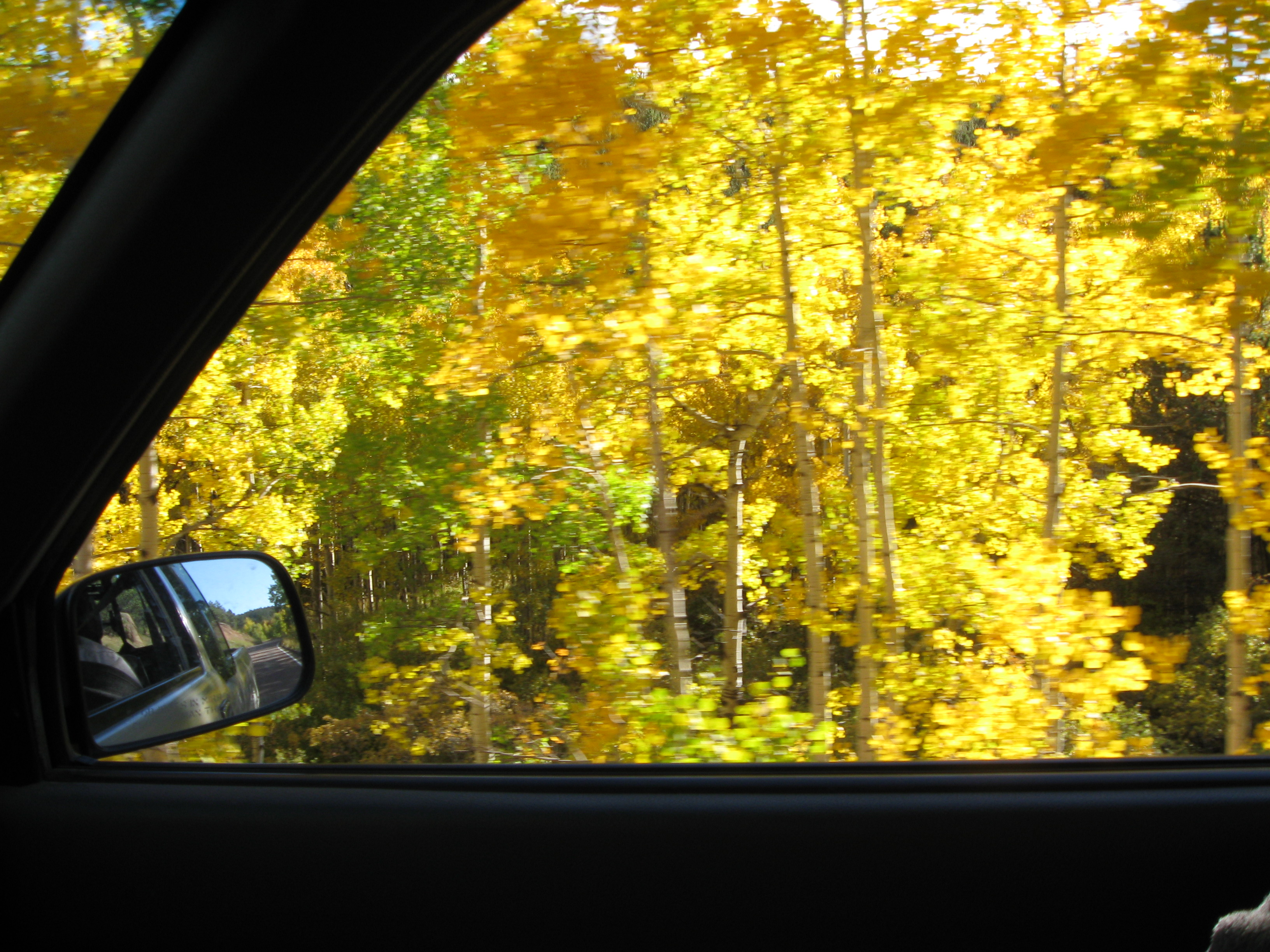
Pike National Forest in the fall.

The dry climate of Pike National Forest makes it prime wildfire territory. The first recorded fires occurred in the 19th century. The forest was recently the location of the Hayman Fire in 2002 and the Waldo Canyon Fire in 2012. The former burned 138,114-acre (558.93 km^{2}) and 133 homes while the latter burned 18,247-acre (73.84 km^{2}) and 346 homes.

The Pike and San Isabel National Forest was recently awarded a major reclamation project to fix the damage from the Hayman wildfire. The project was sponsored by The National Arbor Day Foundation, in conjunction with several university bookstores. Pike and San Isabel was voted the winner from a group of three separate forests. The vote took place at www.buildaforest.com. The school that placed the most votes for Pike and San Isabel National Forest was the University of Central Florida; the Pike and San Isabel National Forest will be a given a name honoring the effort by UCF students, alumni, and supporters.

== Wilderness areas ==
There are three officially designated wilderness areas lying within Pike National Forest that are part of the National Wilderness Preservation System. Two of them extend into neighboring National Forests (as indicated).

- Buffalo Peaks Wilderness, 67.83 square miles (partly in San Isabel NF)
- Lost Creek Wilderness, 187 square miles
- Mount Evans Wilderness, 116.3 square miles (mostly in Arapaho NF)

== Climate ==
Most of the forest experiences a Highland climate with warm summers and cold winters. Even in the summer, nights are cool due to the forest's high elevation. Temperatures and precipitation vary widely throughout the forest, depending on elevation. Most of the forest receives more than 100 inches of snow a year.

Climate data for Ruxton Park, Colorado, 1991–2020 normals, extremes 1959–present
Month	Jan	Feb	Mar	Apr	May	Jun	Jul	Aug	Sep	Oct	Nov	Dec	Year
Record high °F (°C)	62 (17)	60 (16)	66 (19)	72 (22)	81 (27)	88 (31)	89 (32)	86 (30)	84 (29)	76 (24)	69 (21)	64 (18)	89 (32)
Mean maximum °F (°C)	51.5 (10.8)	51.6 (10.9)	57.2 (14.0)	62.6 (17.0)	72.0 (22.2)	80.3 (26.8)	81.2 (27.3)	77.6 (25.3)	74.6 (23.7)	68.5 (20.3)	57.5 (14.2)	52.2 (11.2)	82.4 (28.0)
Mean daily maximum °F (°C)	38.7 (3.7)	39.4 (4.1)	45.1 (7.3)	50.5 (10.3)	59.4 (15.2)	70.5 (21.4)	74.0 (23.3)	71.5 (21.9)	65.9 (18.8)	55.7 (13.2)	46.0 (7.8)	38.9 (3.8)	54.6 (12.6)
Daily mean °F (°C)	25.7 (−3.5)	26.5 (−3.1)	32.5 (0.3)	38.0 (3.3)	46.2 (7.9)	56.3 (13.5)	60.3 (15.7)	58.1 (14.5)	52.5 (11.4)	42.7 (5.9)	32.8 (0.4)	26.0 (−3.3)	41.5 (5.3)
Mean daily minimum °F (°C)	12.6 (−10.8)	13.6 (−10.2)	19.9 (−6.7)	25.6 (−3.6)	32.9 (0.5)	42.1 (5.6)	46.5 (8.1)	44.6 (7.0)	39.1 (3.9)	29.8 (−1.2)	19.5 (−6.9)	13.0 (−10.6)	28.3 (−2.1)
Mean minimum °F (°C)	−9.3 (−22.9)	−9.4 (−23.0)	−2.7 (−19.3)	4.2 (−15.4)	16.0 (−8.9)	27.6 (−2.4)	34.2 (1.2)	33.7 (0.9)	22.4 (−5.3)	8.2 (−13.2)	−4.0 (−20.0)	−10.6 (−23.7)	−15.1 (−26.2)
Record low °F (°C)	−35 (−37)	−33 (−36)	−21 (−29)	−18 (−28)	3 (−16)	14 (−10)	24 (−4)	23 (−5)	4 (−16)	−10 (−23)	−25 (−32)	−28 (−33)	−35 (−37)
Average precipitation inches (mm)	0.74 (19)	0.97 (25)	1.88 (48)	3.13 (80)	2.55 (65)	2.11 (54)	3.89 (99)	3.94 (100)	1.93 (49)	1.19 (30)	0.85 (22)	0.76 (19)	23.94 (610)
Average snowfall inches (cm)	12.5 (32)	13.6 (35)	26.2 (67)	32.3 (82)	9.6 (24)	0.4 (1.0)	0.0 (0.0)	0.0 (0.0)	1.8 (4.6)	10.4 (26)	12.6 (32)	14.1 (36)	133.5 (339.6)
Average precipitation days (≥ 0.01 in)	4.8	5.5	6.7	8.5	10.3	10.6	16.2	16.8	8.8	5.8	5.3	5.2	104.5
Average snowy days (≥ 0.1 in)	5.1	5.5	7.1	7.1	3.1	0.3	0.0	0.0	0.6	3.1	4.6	5.4	41.9
Source 1: NOAA
Source 2: National Weather Service

Climate data for Lake Moraine Weather Station (Elevation 10,240ft)
Month	Jan	Feb	Mar	Apr	May	Jun	Jul	Aug	Sep	Oct	Nov	Dec	Year
Record high °F (°C)	56 (13)	57 (14)	61 (16)	65 (18)	73 (23)	85 (29)	82 (28)	82 (28)	75 (24)	71 (22)	60 (16)	62 (17)	85 (29)
Mean daily maximum °F (°C)	31.2 (−0.4)	32.0 (0.0)	35.2 (1.8)	41.9 (5.5)	50.5 (10.3)	61.6 (16.4)	65.9 (18.8)	64.3 (17.9)	59.5 (15.3)	49.9 (9.9)	39.9 (4.4)	33.1 (0.6)	47.1 (8.4)
Mean daily minimum °F (°C)	9.6 (−12.4)	9.8 (−12.3)	13.2 (−10.4)	20.6 (−6.3)	28.8 (−1.8)	37.6 (3.1)	41.8 (5.4)	40.9 (4.9)	35.6 (2.0)	26.3 (−3.2)	16.9 (−8.4)	10.8 (−11.8)	24.3 (−4.3)
Record low °F (°C)	−34 (−37)	−37 (−38)	−30 (−34)	−12 (−24)	−3 (−19)	14 (−10)	25 (−4)	24 (−4)	8 (−13)	−10 (−23)	−19 (−28)	−24 (−31)	−34 (−37)
Average precipitation inches (mm)	0.68 (17)	0.91 (23)	1.63 (41)	2.92 (74)	2.86 (73)	2.44 (62)	4.29 (109)	3.80 (97)	1.67 (42)	1.42 (36)	0.80 (20)	0.73 (19)	24.16 (614)
Average snowfall inches (cm)	11.7 (30)	15.8 (40)	25.4 (65)	37.6 (96)	19.6 (50)	1.8 (4.6)	0 (0)	0 (0)	2.2 (5.6)	12.4 (31)	14.1 (36)	12.0 (30)	152.7 (388)

== See also ==
- List of national forests of the United States
- United States Army Pike’s Peak Research Laboratory
- Devil's Head Lookout
- Culturally modified trees
- Barr Trail
