= List of Wyoming Wildlife Habitat Management Areas =

Wyoming Wildlife Habitat Management Areas are protected conservation areas within the U.S. State of Wyoming.

== Hunting and permits ==
The state has a convoluted and complex system for recreational hunting that is more straightforward concerning fishing. There are:

- 119 Public Access Areas (PAAs). Permanent or long-term easements, or owned by the Department for fishing, boating and limited hunting,
- 45 Wildlife Habitat Management Areas (WHMAs). Commission-administered lands to protecting seasonal wildlife ranges, especially winter range preservation and hunting.
- 72 Hunter Management Areas (HMAs). Private ranches sometimes intermixed with public tracts, that are enrolled in the Access Yes program for big game and bird hunting.

== List of Wildlife Habitat Management Areas ==
Wildlife Habitat Management Areas (WHMA) and Hunter Management Areas (HMA):

Name	Area (acres)	Type	Notes
Absaroka Front	111,998 acres (45,324 ha)	HMA	Turkey, antelope, deer and elk. Permission slip and vehicle pass required.
Amsden Creek	4,100 acres (1,700 ha) protected area	WHMA	Elk, mule deer, small game, and bird species. Permission is generally not required unless hunting in overlapping Hunter Management Areas (HMAs), early-season shed antler hunting, or special management zones.
Bear Creek	723 acres (293 ha)	HMA	Antlerless elk. Permission slip and vehicle pass required.
Bear River Divide	230,346 acres (93,218 ha)	HMA	Fishing, hunting and camping. Permission slip is required.
Beer Mug	11,781 acres (4,768 ha)	HMA	Elk. Permission slip and vehicle pass required.
Bell Otte	9,803 acres (3,967 ha)	HMA	Elk. Permission slip and vehicle pass required.
Black Butte	520 acres (210 ha)	WHMA	Strict seasonal access closures between December and April. Upward of 500 elk winter on the WHMA and surrounding BLM land.
Broom Creek	72,183 acres (29,211 ha)	HMA	Waterfowl, doves, turkey, rabbit, antelope, deer and elk. Permission slip and vehicle pass required.
Bud Love	7,900 acres (3,200 ha)	WHMA	Established in 1970. Located on the eastern side of the Bighorn Mountains in Johnson County. Winter range for up to 500 elk and 200 mule deer.
Camp Creek	150 acres (61 ha)	WHMA	Nearest town: Jackson. Protected property. Fauna: elk, moose, bighorn sheep, deer, pronghorn, bears, mountain lions, and 35 species of birds. Around 2,000 wintering elk.
Carter Mountain	80,364 acres (32,522 ha)	HMA	Between 10 and 15 miles south of Cody. The west side borders Wyoming State Highway 120. Bighorn sheep, pronghorn and elk. Hunters are required to hold the specific valid permission slip, license and obey published bag limits.
Casper Creek	640 acres (260 ha)	HMA	Deer, sandhill crane. Permission slip and vehicle pass required.
Chain Lakes	62,386.6 acres	WHMA	Nearest town: Wamsutter. Winter habitat for pronghorn but open all year.
Chalk Hill	2,407 acres (974 ha)	HMA	Waterfowl, doves, antelope, deer, elk and predators. Permission slip and vehicle pass required.
Cherokee Park	3,611 acres (1,461 ha)	HMA	
Cheyenne River	3,578 acres (1,448 ha)	HMA	Elk. Permission slip and vehicle pass required.
Chimney Butte	9,970 acres (4,030 ha)	HMA	Antlerless elk. Permission slip required.
Como Bluffs	62,008 acres (25,094 ha)	HMA	
Cottonwood Draw	699.8 acres (283.2 ha)	WHMA	Platte County.
Coyote Creek	5,566 acres (2,252 ha)	HMA	Waterfowl, rabbits, antelope, deer, elk, moose and mountain lion. Permission slip and vehicle pass required.
Deep Creek	2,000 acres (810 ha)	HMA	Antelope, deer and elk. Permission slip and vehicle pass required.
Deer Creek	30,680 acres (12,420 ha)	HMA	Cow/calf elk ONLY. Permission slip and vehicle pass required.
Diamond Lake	166,632 acres (67,434 ha)	HMA	Antelope. Near the Diamond Lake Public Access Area (PAA). Permission slip and vehicle pass required.
Duncan Ranch	7,277 acres (2,945 ha)	HMA	Blue grouse, partridge, turkey, rabbit, antelope, deer, elk, mountain lion and black bear. Permission slip and vehicle pass required.
East Division	41,870 acres (16,940 ha)	HMA	Permission slip and vehicle pass required.
Ed O. Taylor	10,215 acres (4,134 ha)	WHMA	Clossed January 1 - May 14.
Elk Mountain	5,476 acres (2,216 ha)	HMA	Antlerless elk. Permission slip and vehicle pass required.
Ellis	3,835.62 acres (1,552.22 ha)	WHMA	Protected land established in 2022. Closed to human presence from January 1 through May 31, for big game wintering protection.
Fall Creek	600 acres (240 ha)+	WHMA	Closed December 1 through April 30.
FE Warren	Approximately 6,000 acres (2,400 ha)	HMA	Antelope. Valid Military or Department of Defense (DoD) ID, or have a personal sponsorship with valid base security clearance
Forbes/Sheep Mountain	950 acres (380 ha)	WHMA	Protected land and winter feeding area for 500 deer and 300 elk.
Fort Phil Kearny Hunter Management Area	547 acres (221 ha)	HMA	Fort Phil Kearny State Historic Site partnered with the Wyoming Game and Fish Department.
Greybull River	17,427 acres (7,052 ha)	HMA	Permission slip and vehicle pass required.
Greys River	3,041.6 acres (1,230.9 ha)	WHMA	Closed May 1 through December 1 for winter elk feedground. Allows access to the Salt River Range in the Bridger-Teton National Forest.
Half Moon	3,741 acres (1,514 ha)	WHMA	Nearest town: Pinedale
Hanna Draw	43,643 acres (17,662 ha)	HMA	Permission slip and vehicle pass required.
Hanna Draw West		HMA	Carbon County. Permission slip and vehicle pass required.
Harrison Creek	6,969 acres (2,820 ha)	HMA	Antlerless elk. Permission slip and vehicle pass required.
Hat Six	1,309 acres (530 ha)	HMA	Antelope. Permission slip and vehicle pass required.
Heart Mountain	9,924 acres (4,016 ha)	HMA	Elk. Permission slip and vehicle pass required.
Hermit Rock	11,405 acres (4,615 ha)	HMA	Antelope, white-tailed deer and elk. Permission slip and vehicle pass required.
Horse Creek	338 acres (137 ha)	WHMA	Winter feeding range for 2,000 elk
Inberg/Roy	17,280.4 acres (6,993.1 ha)	WHMA	Formally: East Fork WHMA. Closed to human presence January 1 - May 15
Jelm	1,525.71 acres (617.43 ha)	WHMA	Nearest town: Laramie. Big game winter range open all year
Junction	319 acres (129 ha)	HMA	Waterfowl, game birds, rabbits, antelope, deer. Permission slip and vehicle pass required.
Kerns	4,995 acres (2,021 ha)	WHMA	Closed Nov. 1 through May 31, foot traffic allowed Nov. 1 through Nov. 15.
Kirby Creek	11,503 acres (4,655 ha)	HMA	Partridge, antelope, deer, elk. Printed permission slip and vehicle pass needed
Knight Ridge West	25,720 acres (10,410 ha)	HMA	Printed permission slip and vehicle pass needed
La Barge Creek	898 acres (363 ha)	HMA	Moose hunting only. Permission slip and vehicle pass required
Laramie Peak	37,096 acres (15,012 ha)	WHMA	Open all year except Hay Canyon, Tony Ridge, and Duck Creek Canyon from February 1 through April 30.
Laramie River	40,349 acres (16,329 ha)	HMA	Antelope. Permission slip and vehicle pass required
Lewis Ranch	11,570 acres (4,680 ha)	HMA	Permission slip and vehicle pass required
Lone Tree Creek	15,312 acres (6,197 ha)	HMA	Rabbit, antelope, deer (archery only) and elk. Permission slip and vehicle pass required
Lower Nowood	606 acres (245 ha)	HMA	Deer. Permission slip and vehicle pass required
Luke Lynch	364 acres (147 ha)	WHMA	Closed Dec. 1 - May 1 at 6am.
Marshall	5,260 acres (2,130 ha)	HMA	Permission slip and vehicle pass required
McFarlane	16,629 acres (6,730 ha)	HMA	Antlerless elk. Permission slip and vehicle pass required
Medicine Bow River	23,094 acres (9,346 ha)	HMA	Permission slip and vehicle pass required. Can hunt Medicine Bow River HMA or Simpson Ridge HMA but not both.
Medicine Lodge	12,700 acres (5,100 ha)	WHMA	Protected area. Established 1972
Menter Knob	9,645 acres (3,903 ha)	HMA	Permission slip and vehicle pass required
Missouri John	13,363 acres (5,408 ha)	HMA	Permission slip and vehicle pass required
Hart Monolith Ranch	13,499 acres (5,463 ha)	HMA	Hart Monolith or a Spiegelberg Ranch Pastures HMA permission slip, NOT BOTH
Morton Pass	5,666 acres (2,293 ha)	HMA	Antelope. Permission slip and vehicle pass required
Muddy Mountain	43,979 acres (17,798 ha)	HMA	Antelope, elk. Permission slip and vehicle pass required
Mule Creek	4,312 acres (1,745 ha)	HMA	Elk. Permission slip and vehicle pass required
National Elk Refuge	24,700 acres (10,000 ha)	HMA	Elk, Bison, Antelope, and White-tailed deer. Permission slip and vehicle pass required
Newell Springs	5,780 acres (2,340 ha)	HMA	Antelope, deer. Permission slip and vehicle pass required
Nimmo	22,265 acres (9,010 ha)	HMA	Rabbit, antelope. Permission slip and vehicle pass required on HMA land
North Crow	5,857 acres (2,370 ha)	HMA	Antelope, Deer, and Elk. Permission slip and vehicle pass required on HMA land
North Glendo	2,562 acres (1,037 ha)	WHMA	Bureau of Reclamation land,
Ocean Lake	11,505 acres (4,656 ha)	WHMA	Nearest town: Riverton
Patrol Cabin	160 acres (65 ha)	WHMA	Nearest town: Jackson
Pennock Mountain	9,860 acres (3,990 ha)	WHMA	Nearest town: Saratoga
Peterson Draw	682 acres (276 ha)	HMA	Waterfowl, doves, antelope, and deer. Permission slip and vehicle pass required
Pilot Hill	4,010 acres (1,620 ha) (HMA), 3,076 acres (1,245 ha) (WHMA)	HMA - WHMA	Antelope, deer, elk, Black bear, spring and fall turkey, game birds, mountain lion, and moose. -Permission slip and vehicle pass required on HMA land.
Pine Draw	11,579 acres (4,686 ha)	HMA	Permission slip and vehicle pass required
Pinto Creek	9,282 acres (3,756 ha)	HMA	Elk. Permission slip and vehicle pass required
Pitchfork	54,566 acres (22,082 ha)	HMA	Antelope, deer, and elk. Permission slip and vehicle pass required
PK Lane	1,747 acres (707 ha)	HMA	Antlerless elk. Permission slip and vehicle pass required
Rattlesnake Mountain	71,639 acres (28,991 ha)	HMA	Elk and mountain lion. Permission slip and vehicle pass required
Rawhide	967 acres (391 ha)	HMA	Nearest town: Meeteetse. Antelope, anterless white-tailed deer. Permission slip and vehicle pass required.
Rawhide	816.5 acres (330.4 ha)	WHMA	Nearest town: Lingle.
Red Canyon	1,976 acres (800 ha)	WHMA	Nearest town: Lander
Red Rim-Daley	11,100 acres (4,500 ha)	WHMA	Nearest town: Rawlins
Red Rim-Grizzly	38,218 acres (15,466 ha)	WHMA	Nearest town: Rawlins, Wyoming
Renner	15,725 acres (6,364 ha)	WHMA	Nearest town: Hyattville
Sand Creek	284 acres (115 ha)	WHMA	Nearest town: Beulah in Crook County
Sand Mesa	19,357 acres (7,833 ha)	WHMA	Nearest town: Riverton in Fremont County
Shirley Basin	36,673 acres (14,841 ha)	HMA	Elk, antlerless elk. Permission slip and vehicle pass required.
Simpson Ridge	23,094 acres (9,346 ha)	HMA	Checkerboard pattern of public and private land that includes Anadarko Land Corp, Hi-Allen Ranch, and Bowen Ranch. Simpson Ridge HMA or the Medicine Bow River HMA permission slip, but not both. Vehicle pass required.
Soda Lake	3,750 acres (1,520 ha)	WHMA	
Soldier Creek	3,991 acres (1,615 ha)	HMA	Fauna: waterfowl, pheasant, Sharp-tailed grouse, doves, partridge, turkey, rabbit, antelope, deer, elk, mountain lion, prairie dog. Requires obtaining unlimited free permission slips and signing in each day before hunt and vehicle pass required.
South Park	832 acres (337 ha)	WHMA	Established 1939.
Spanish Point	5,489 acres (2,221 ha)	HMA	Antlerless elk. Permission slip and vehicle pass required.
Spence & Moriarity	35,871.9 acres (14,516.8 ha)	WHMA	Nearest town: Dubois. No human presence January 1 - May 15.
Spiegelberg	7,272 acres (2,943 ha)	HMA	Antelope. Hart Monolith or a Spiegelberg Ranch Pastures HMA permission slip, NOT BOTH. Permission slip and vehicle pass required.
Spriggs	180 acres (73 ha)	HMA	Elk. Heavily restricted. Follow rules.
Springer/Bump Sullivan	3,420 acres (1,380 ha)	WHMA	Nearest town: Torrington
Stone Creek	14,844 acres (6,007 ha)	HMA	Elk. Permission slip and vehicle pass required.
Strouss Hill	15,518 acres (6,280 ha)	HMA	Antelope or antlerless elk during the specific species season. Permission slip and vehicle pass required.
Sunlight	1,414 acres (572 ha)	WHMA	Protected area. Nearest town Cody
Table Mountain	1,716 acres (694 ha)	WHMA	Nearest town: Torrington, Goshen County. Protected area.
Tipton	58,470 acres (23,660 ha)	HMA	Antelope. Private and/or leased lands of PH Livestock Co. Permission slip and vehicle pass required.
Tom Thorne/Beth Williams	2,961 acres (1,198 ha)	WHMA	Nearest town Laramie
Turtle Hill	793 acres (321 ha)	HMA	Antelope. Permission slip and vehicle pass required.
Upper Nowood	3,983 acres (1,612 ha)	HMA	Sage grouse, doves, partridge, antelope, deer, and elk. Private lands, BLM, State, and Forest Service parcels.
Whiskey Basin	12,782 acres (5,173 ha)	WHMA	Four miles east of Dubois. A winter grazing area for the world's largest bighorn sheep herd. The Absaroka herd has an estimated number of 4000. A 1,930 square mile range from the Montana border south to Dubois, through the Absaroka Range and major wilderness areas like North Absaroka Wilderness, Washakie Wilderness and Teton Wilderness.
Wick Brothers/Beumee	23,407.7 acres (9,472.8 ha)	WMA	Fishing, hunting and trapping.
X-Bar Ranch	18,748 acres (7,587 ha)	HMA	Waterfowl, doves, rabbits, antelope, elk, predators
Yellowtail Wildlife Habitat Management Area	19,214 acres (7,776 ha)	WHMA	Fauna includes bighorn sheep, bald eagles and wild horses. The area is a habitat for over 200 species of birds. There are over 35 miles (56 km)of roads and trails. Fishing for trout, walleye, catfish and perch in Bighorn Lake.

== Wilderness areas ==
There are 15 federally designated Official U.S. Forest Service designated wilderness zones. Wyoming law mandates that nonresident big game (deer, elk, moose, bighorn sheep, mountain goat) or trophy game (black bear, mountain lion, wolf) hunters must use either a professional outfitter or resident guide.

List of Wilderness Areas:

- Absaroka–Beartooth Wilderness: 23,694 acres (9,589 ha) of the 937,032 acres (379,203 ha) are in Wyoming.
- Bridger Wilderness
- Cloud Peak Wilderness
- Encampment River Wilderness
- Fitzpatrick Wilderness
- Gros Ventre Wilderness
- Huston Park Wilderness
- Jedediah Smith Wilderness
- North Absaroka Wilderness
- Platte River Wilderness
- Popo Agie Wilderness
- Savage Run Wilderness
- Teton Wilderness
- Washakie Wilderness
- Winegar Hole Wilderness
