= Troublesome Creek =

Troublesome Creek could mean:

- Troublesome Creek (Hess Creek), a creek in Yukon–Koyukuk Census Area, Alaska
- Troublesome Creek (Colorado River), a stream in Colorado
- Troublesome Creek (Long Creek tributary), a stream in Georgia
- Troublesome Creek (Towaliga River tributary), a stream in Georgia
- Troublesome Creek (North Fork Kentucky River), a creek in Kentucky
- Troublesome Creek (Missouri), a creek in Missouri
- Troublesome Creek (Haw River tributary), a stream in North Carolina
- Troublesome Creek (Clinch River), a creek in Virginia
- Troublesome Creek: A Midwestern, a 1995 documentary film
