= Troublesome =

Troublesome may refer to:

- Troublesome, Colorado, a community in the United States
- Troublesome, Kansas, United States
- Troublesome Valley, a valley in West Virginia
- "Troublesome", a 2022 song by No Money Enterprise and Section 60
- "Troublesome", a 2023 song by Indo-Canadian rapper Sukha

== See also ==
- Troublesome Creek (disambiguation)
