= Sierra Madre Range (Wyoming) =

Mountain in Colorado and Wyoming, United States

- Sierra Madre Mountains
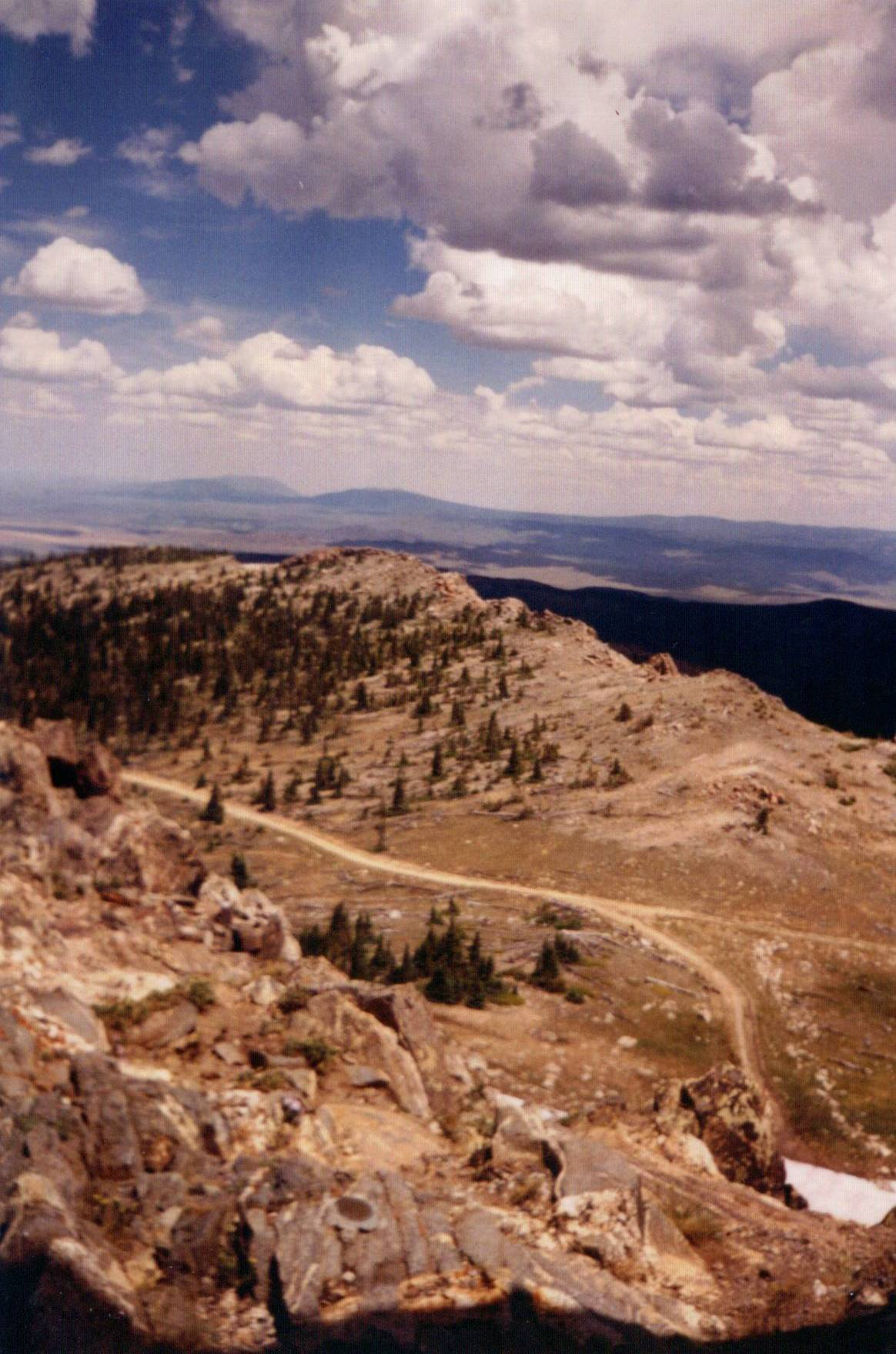
- A backcountry road in the Sierra Madre Range near Bridger Peak

Highest point
- Peak: Bridger Peak
- Elevation: 3,354 m (11,004 ft)
- Coordinates: 41°11′21″N 107°02′50″W

Geography
- Location within Wyoming
- Country: United States
- State: Wyoming and Colorado
- Parent range: Rocky Mountains

The Sierra Madre Range is a mountain range in the western United States, located in south-central Wyoming and north-central Colorado. Geologically, it may be considered an extension of the Park Range of Colorado. South of the Great Divide Basin, the US Continental Divide runs along the Sierra Madre high points. Its western basins drain into the Colorado River and its eastern into the North Platte River. Buck Mountain, elevation 11,396 feet (3,474 meters), is the highest peak in the range and lies within Colorado. Bridger Peak, elevation 11,004 feet (3,354 meters), is the range's highest elevation in Wyoming.

Copper resources within the range were extracted during the late 19th and early 20th centuries by the Ferris-Haggarty Mine which lies about two miles west of Bridger Peak. Its operations were centered near Encampment 15 miles to the east. Gold findings in the range during the 1890s sparked a short-lived gold rush that attracted thousands of prospectors. The possibility of further discoveries renewed interest during the late 20th and early 21st centuries.

Much of the range lies within the Medicine Bow – Routt National Forest. Protected areas include the Encampment River Wilderness, the Huston Park Wilderness, and parts of the Mount Zirkel Wilderness. The range is traversed by Wyoming Highway 70, which (except in winter when the road is closed) crosses the Continental Divide at an elevation of 9,915 feet (3,022 m) at Battle Pass near the old Battle mining site.

The range supports a number of popular game species, including elk, mule deer, and grouse, along with other species mentioned in the state's Comprehensive Wildlife Conservation Strategy Report. In 2009 the state's Game and Fish Department, describing its wildlife as "world class", issued a report recommending that the area's natural values be analyzed and that energy development leases in the area be withdrawn.

== Climate ==
Climate data for Bridger Peak 41.1896 N, 107.0493 W, Elevation: 10,814 ft (3,296 m) (1991–2020 normals)
Month	Jan	Feb	Mar	Apr	May	Jun	Jul	Aug	Sep	Oct	Nov	Dec	Year
Mean daily maximum °F (°C)	25.1 (−3.8)	25.7 (−3.5)	32.4 (0.2)	38.0 (3.3)	47.4 (8.6)	59.2 (15.1)	67.1 (19.5)	65.2 (18.4)	56.5 (13.6)	43.3 (6.3)	31.8 (−0.1)	24.7 (−4.1)	43.0 (6.1)
Daily mean °F (°C)	15.4 (−9.2)	15.3 (−9.3)	21.2 (−6.0)	26.5 (−3.1)	35.8 (2.1)	46.7 (8.2)	54.4 (12.4)	52.7 (11.5)	44.8 (7.1)	32.8 (0.4)	22.3 (−5.4)	15.3 (−9.3)	31.9 (−0.1)
Mean daily minimum °F (°C)	5.8 (−14.6)	5.0 (−15.0)	9.9 (−12.3)	15.0 (−9.4)	24.1 (−4.4)	34.2 (1.2)	41.7 (5.4)	40.3 (4.6)	33.1 (0.6)	22.3 (−5.4)	12.8 (−10.7)	5.9 (−14.5)	20.8 (−6.2)
Average precipitation inches (mm)	7.89 (200)	6.28 (160)	6.15 (156)	6.43 (163)	4.75 (121)	2.30 (58)	1.72 (44)	1.77 (45)	3.08 (78)	4.97 (126)	6.54 (166)	7.32 (186)	59.2 (1,503)
Source: PRISM Climate Group

== See also ==
- List of mountain ranges in Wyoming
