= East Troublesome Fire =

2020 wildfire in Colorado

- Part of the 2020 Colorado wildfires
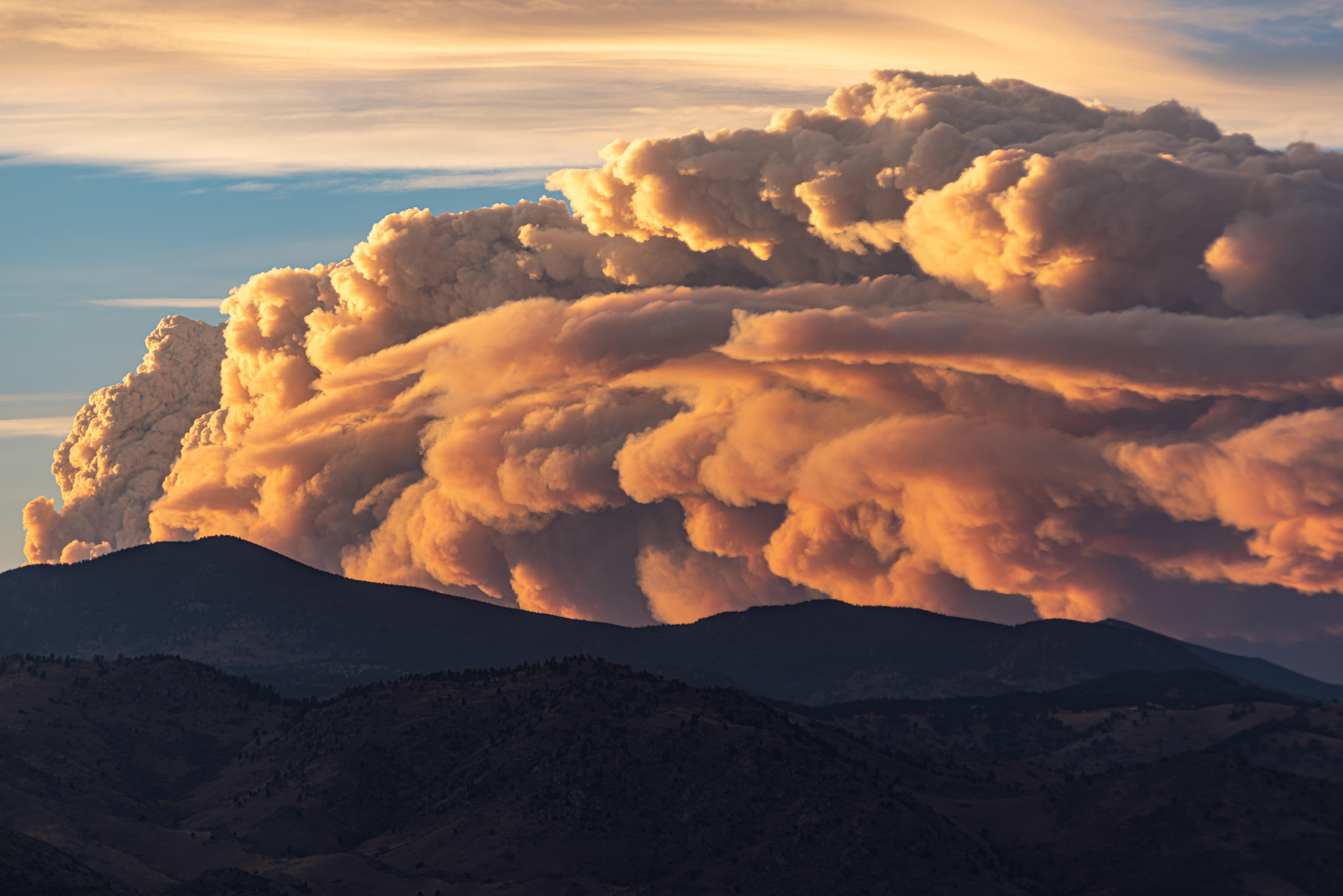
- The East Troublesome Fire producing a huge column of smoke during sunset on October 21
- Date: October 14 –; November 30, 2020; (48 days)
- Location: Grand County and; Larimer County, Colorado, United States
- Coordinates: 40.201°N 106.234°W

Statistics
- Burned area: 193,812 acres (78,433 ha; 303 sq mi; 784 km^{2})

Impacts
- Deaths: 2
- Structures destroyed: 555
- Cost: $558.7 million; (equivalent to about $683.8 million in 2025)

Ignition
- Cause: Human-caused

Map
- Location of the East Troublesome Fire in Colorado

The 2020 East Troublesome Fire was a massive and destructive wildfire, and the second-largest in the history of the U.S. state of Colorado. Named for the East Fork of Troublesome Creek, close to the fire's point of origin in the Arapaho National Forest, the fire burned 193,812 acres (78,433 ha) between its ignition on October 14, 2020, and its containment on November 30. The fire destroyed 555 structures and killed two people, devastating portions of the community of Grand Lake. The majority of the fire's burned acreage and structural losses accrued on October 21, when the fire burned more than 100,000 acres (40,000 ha) in a single day.

== Background ==
The period between July 1, 2020, and the East Troublesome Fire's ignition was the driest recorded such period in history at the Grand Lake climate station, where records dated back over a century. The fire also burned through large stands of lodgepole pine affected by bark beetles. Estimates of the proportion of trees killed by bark beetles in the area the fire made its unprecedented run through were as high as 70 to 90 percent.

The number of wildfires that have burned areas ≥10,000 acres (4,000 ha) in Colorado has increased dramatically in the 21st century, but the most active months of the year for wildfire activity in the state are typically June and July. The East Troublesome Fire was the third-latest ≥10,000-acre (4,000 ha) fire ever recorded in the state: only the Junkins Fire in 2016 and the Calwood Fire in 2020 ignited later.

== Cause ==
The East Troublesome Fire's precise cause is not known. It was first detected when an elk hunter noticed a plume of smoke shortly after 12:00 p.m. MDT on Wednesday, October 14, in the wilderness north of Kremmling and reported it to 911. Based on evidence gathered at the fire's origin, U.S. Forest Service investigators determined it was of human origin. Based on the location and time of year of the ignition, "it may have been caused by a hunter or a backcountry camper, and possibly by accident," according to a Forest Service press release issued June 3, 2022. Investigators said they would continue to try to identify the person responsible.

== Progression ==
During the fire's first week, only 90 or so homes lay under evacuation orders. On October 20, the National Weather Service office for Denver and Boulder issued a red flag warning for the following day, forecasting winds of 10 to 20 mph with gusts to 35 mph and relative humidity levels as low as 12%.

On October 21, the fire underwent an unprecedented expansion. The fire crossed Colorado State Highway 125 sometime after 4:00 p.m. on October 21, as firefighters reported a large increase in fire activity. Firefighters arrived at Trail Creek Estates, a rural subdivision in between Highway 125 and Grand Lake, between 5:30 and 6:30 p.m. but found fire activity already too extreme to engage, with crown fires moving through stands of lodgepole pine. They abandoned structure protection efforts and focused on evacuations. By this point, at about 6:00 p.m., the fire had already doubled in size to about 40,000 acres (16,000 ha). The National Weather Service office in Denver/Boulder began to issue civil emergency messages as the fire neared more populated areas. By 5:33 a.m. on October 22 the fire had burned 125,678 acres (50,860 ha).

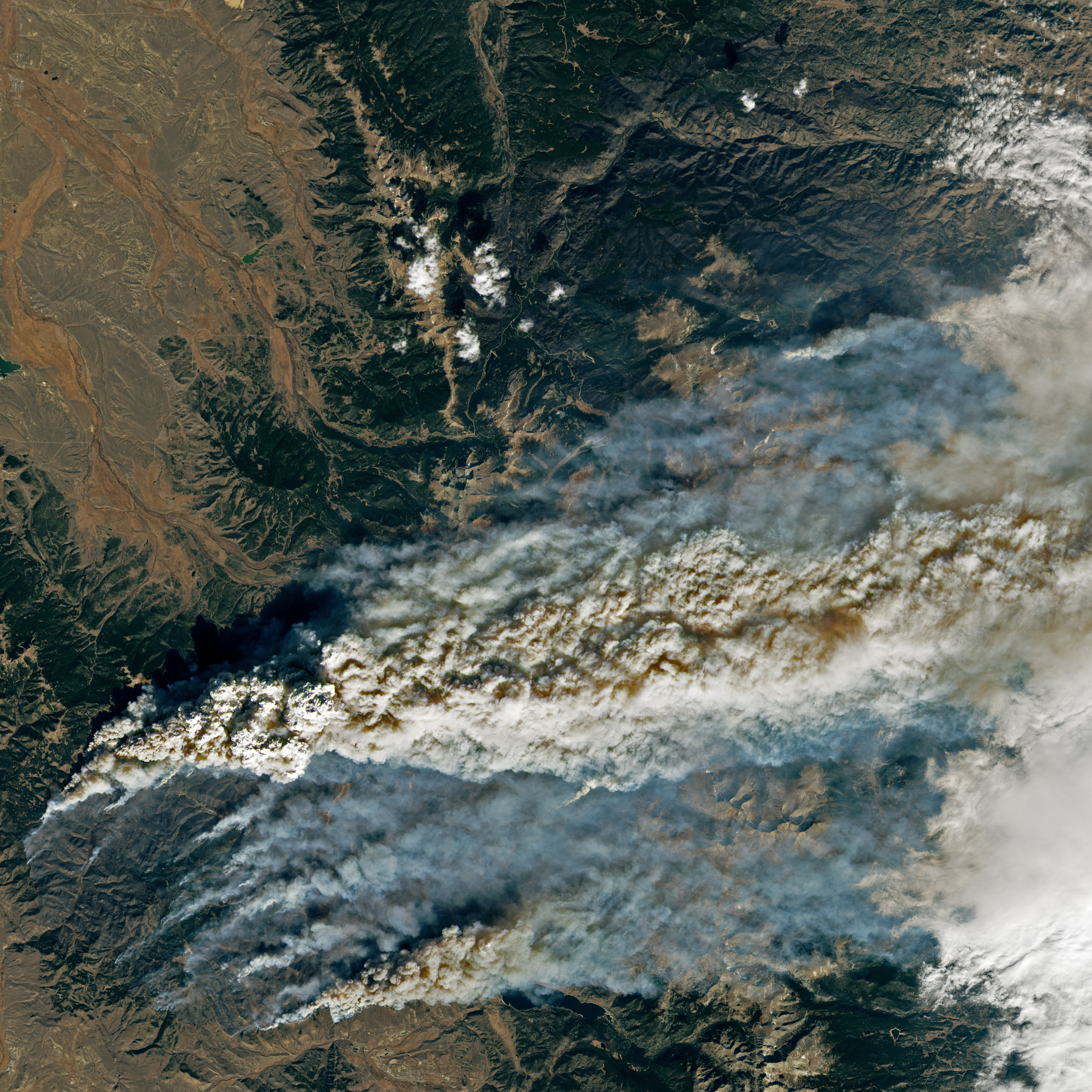
The East Troublesome Fire producing a pyrocumulus cloud on October 22

Between mid-day on October 21 and the evening of October 22, the fire pushed 25 miles (40 km) east, growing from 19,000 acres (7,700 ha) to more than 170,000 acres (69,000 ha). During this period it generated massive pyrocumulonimbus clouds, which rose to around 45,000 feet (14,000 m) in altitude and generated lightning. In this time the fire grew by more than 6,000 acres (2,400 ha) per hour: the equivalent of 75 standard American football fields every minute. The incident commander, Noel Livingston, described the fire's expansion as "unheard of for a fire in this part of the world in timber". The fire jumped over the Continental Divide, well above tree line, when embers spotted 1.5 miles (2.4 km) from the head of Tonahutu Creek on the west side of the Front Range and ignited a spot fire in the head of Spruce Creek on the east side. The spot fire, which established itself on the northwest side of Mount Wuh, quickly grew and threatened Estes Park. Trail Ridge Road through Rocky Mountain National Park became impassable as burned trees fell on the roadway.

Late in the afternoon on Thursday, October 22, a cold frontal passage sharply improved weather conditions on the eastern side of the Continental Divide, subduing the portion of the fire that had led to evacuations in Estes Park earlier in the day. Fuel treatments like thinning and prescribed burns also aided firefighters in their efforts to stop the fire's progression towards Estes Park, in concert with the better weather conditions.

The East Troublesome Fire was declared 100 percent contained on November 30, 2020. The effort to contain the fire cost $15.7 million, according to the National Interagency Coordination Center.

== Effects ==
The fire caused two fatalities. Lyle Hileman, 86, and Marylin Hileman, 84, lived outside Grand Lake and chose not to evacuate. They were killed when their property burned during the fire's major expansion on October 21.

The fire destroyed 555 structures, including 366 residences. The Rocky Mountain Insurance Information Association estimated that insured losses from the fire reached $543 million, stemming from approximately 1,600 homeowner and auto insurance claims. This made the East Troublesome Fire the most expensive wildfire in Colorado history until the Marshall Fire in Boulder County surpassed it just over a year later.

The East Troublesome Fire was the largest fire in Rocky Mountain National Park's 107-year-long history, burning more than 22,000 acres (8,900 ha) inside the park's boundaries. The fire destroyed multiple buildings and facilities in the park, including 18 historic buildings at a seasonal housing complex for park employees and three RV sites.

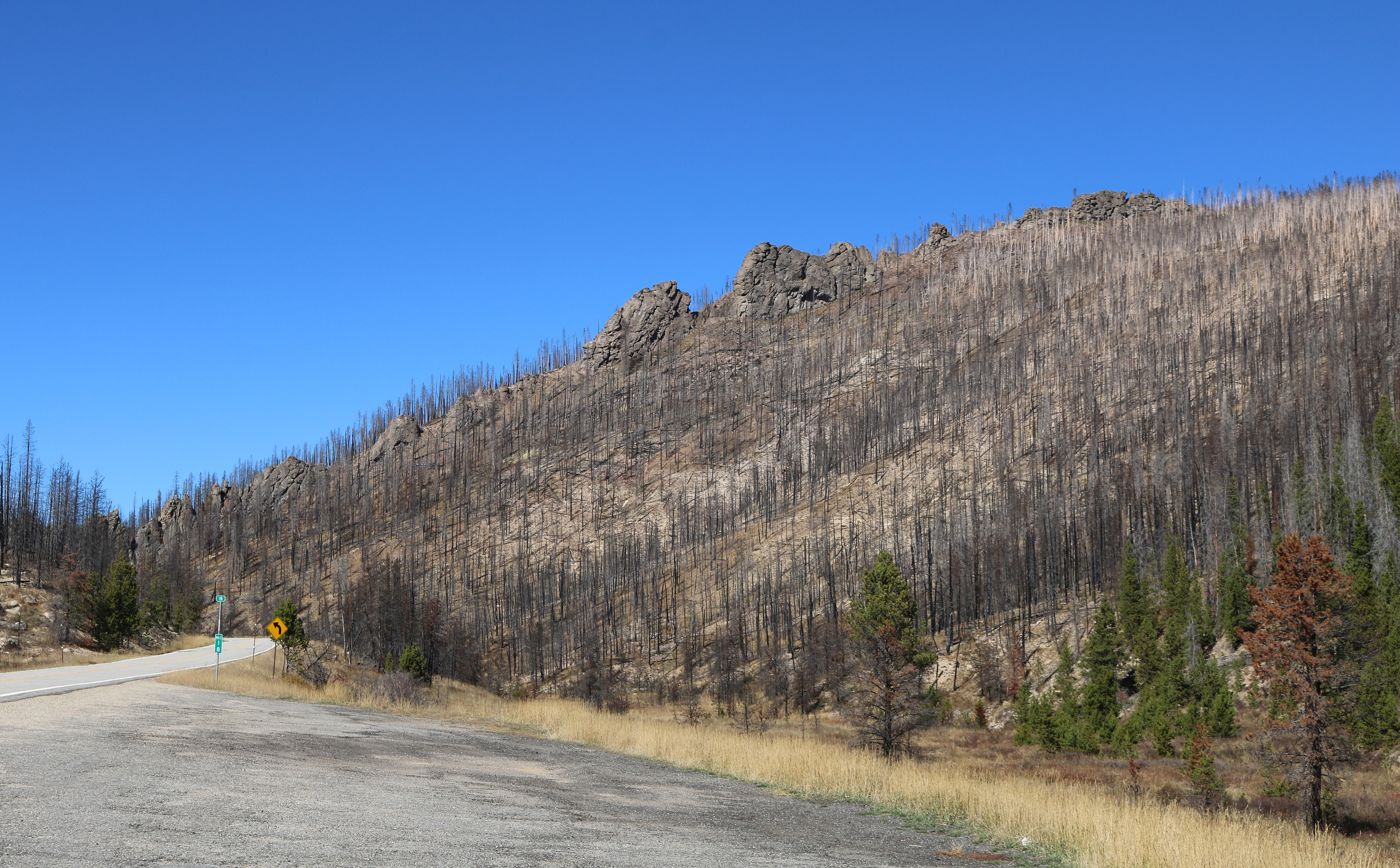
A high-severity area of the burn scar, south of Willow Creek Pass on Colorado State Highway 125

=== Wildfire spread modeling ===
The East Troublesome Fire led to advancements in wildfire spread prediction. The fire's dramatic expansion on October 21 vastly exceeded the predicted spread that computer models used by meteorologists and fire personnel had forecast. A National Center for Atmospheric Research (NCAR) report in 2022 showed that a government dataset called LANDFIRE, which provides much of the data on fuels for fire simulations, contained an outdated model of fuels in the fire area. Between 2016, when the data for LANDFIRE was collected, and the fire four years later, forests in the path of the East Troublesome Fire had experienced widespread tree mortality from bark beetles. The discovery of the mismatch led NCAR scientists to develop a program using a machine learning model and satellite imagery to generate quicker and more accurate fuel models, and correspondingly more accurate fire spread predictions.

== See also ==
- List of Colorado wildfires
- Mullen Fire
- Cameron Peak Fire
- Grizzly Creek Fire
- Pine Gulch Fire
