= Troublesome, Colorado =

Unincorporated community in Grand County, Colorado, United States

Troublesome
- Unincorporated community
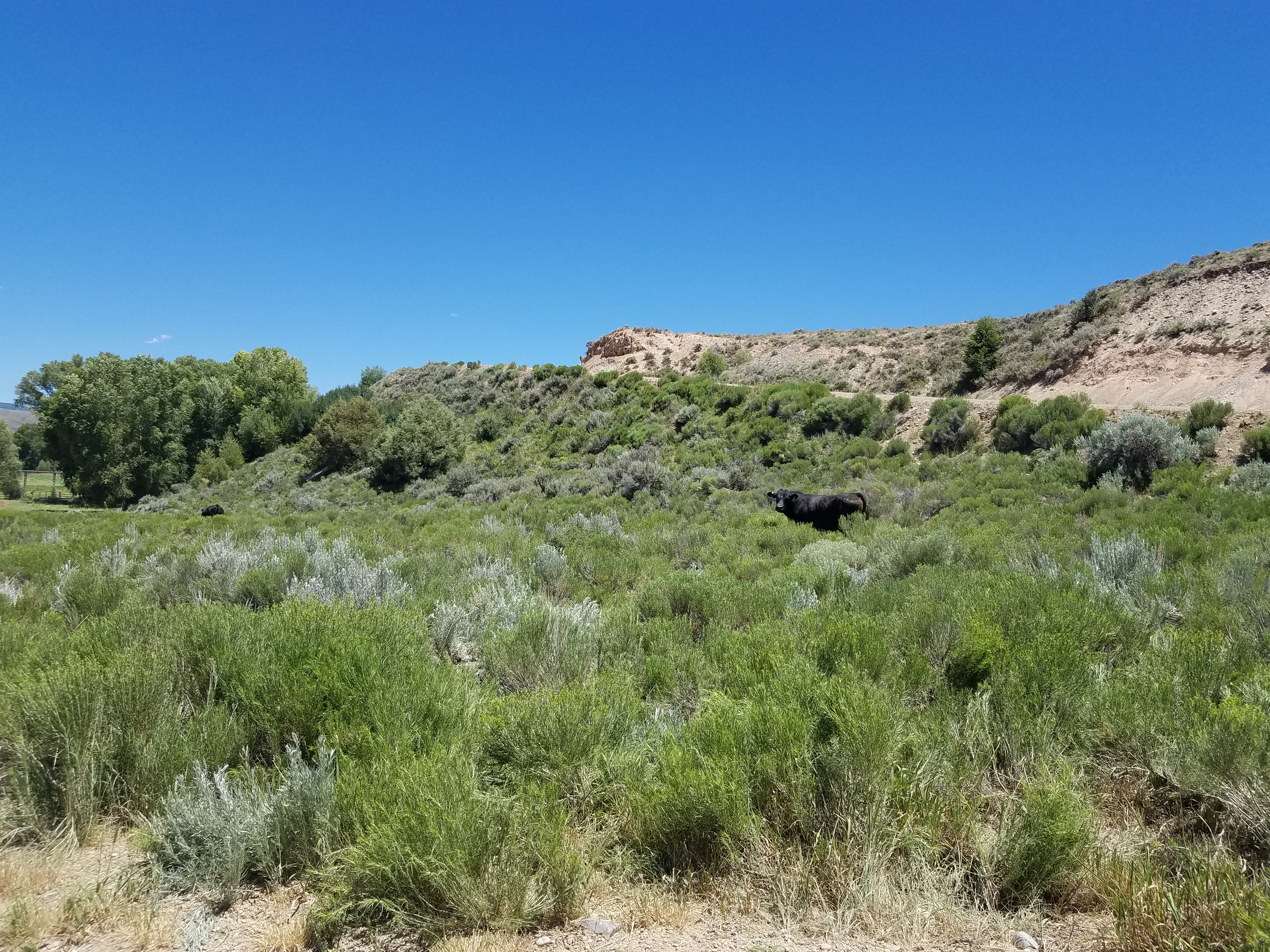
- Cattle near County Road 39 in Troublesome, Colorado
- Interactive map of Troublesome
- Coordinates: 40°03′39″N 106°17′30″W
- Country: United States
- State: Colorado
- County: Grand County
- Post office opened: 1878
- Post office closed: 1935

Troublesome is an unincorporated community in Grand County, east of Kremmling in the U.S. state of Colorado.

== History ==
A post office called Troublesome was established in 1878, and remained in operation until 1935. The community takes its name from nearby Troublesome Creek.

On May 15, 1956, there was a side collision between two freight trains on the Denver and Rio Grande Western Railroad at the Troublesome siding, 375 feet west of the US Highway 40 bridge over the rail line. This resulted in the injury of four train-service employees, of the ten aboard both trains. The eastbound engines were put off the track, as were numerous freight cars, but the track was cleared for use two days later. It was determined that the engineer and brakeman of the eastbound train were distracted by conversation, and didn't notice signals warning them to slow and allow a westbound train to clear the switch at the east end of the siding. A safety film, Some Trouble at Troublesome, was produced by the D&RG to detail the cause and aftermath of the collision.

On October 1, 2020 the second largest fire in Colorado history took place in East Troublesome. The East Troublesome Fire burned more than 120,000 acres in less than a day, making it the most rapid-fire expansion recorded in state history.
