= Comanche Reservoir =

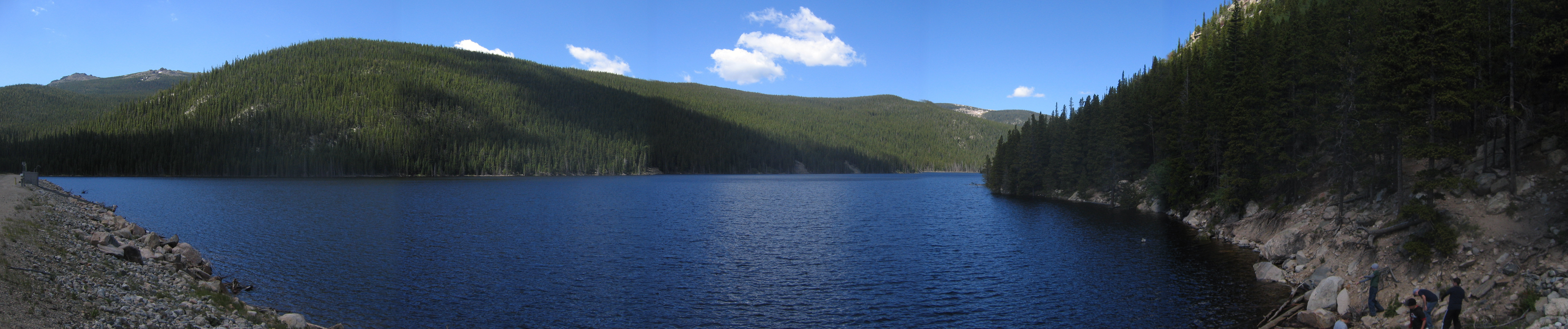
- Panoramic photo of Comanche Reservoir in July 2005.

- Location within Colorado Location within the United States
- Coordinates: 40°35′N 105°39′W
- Lake type: Reservoir
- Basin countries: United States
- Surface elevation: 9,399 feet (2,865 m)
- References: U.S. Geological Survey Geographic Names Information System: Comanche Reservoir

Comanche Reservoir is a large reservoir in the Comanche Peak Wilderness in the Roosevelt National Forest within Colorado, United States. It lies on several hiking trails and is close to the Pingree Park wilderness campus of Colorado State University.

This body of water is not to be confused with Comanche Lake, which is shortly to the reservoir's west.
