= Sarvis Creek Wilderness =

Wilderness area in Colorado, United States

- IUCN category Ib (wilderness area)
- Location within the United States
- Location: Grand / Routt counties, Colorado, USA
- Nearest city: Steamboat Springs, CO
- Coordinates: 40°14′00″N 106°41′00″W
- Area: 47,140 acres (190.8 km^{2})
- Established: 1993
- Governing body: U.S. Forest Service

The Sarvis Creek Wilderness is a U.S. Wilderness Area located south of Steamboat Springs, Colorado in the Routt National Forest. The area is named after the Sarvis Timber Company, which once logged the area. The area contains no alpine tundra, in contrast to most wilderness areas in Colorado. There are over 20 miles (32 km) of trails in the wilderness. On March 20, 2024 U.S. Senators John Hickenlooper and Michael Bennet, along with Representative Joe Neguse, introduced the Sarvis Creek Wilderness Completion Act, new legislation that would expand the Sarvis Creek Wilderness Area in Routt National Forest by 6,817 acres, protecting sub-alpine wilderness habitats and wildlife while providing increased access to outdoor recreation.
