= Rawah Wilderness =

Wilderness preserve in Colorado, US

- IUCN category Ib (wilderness area)
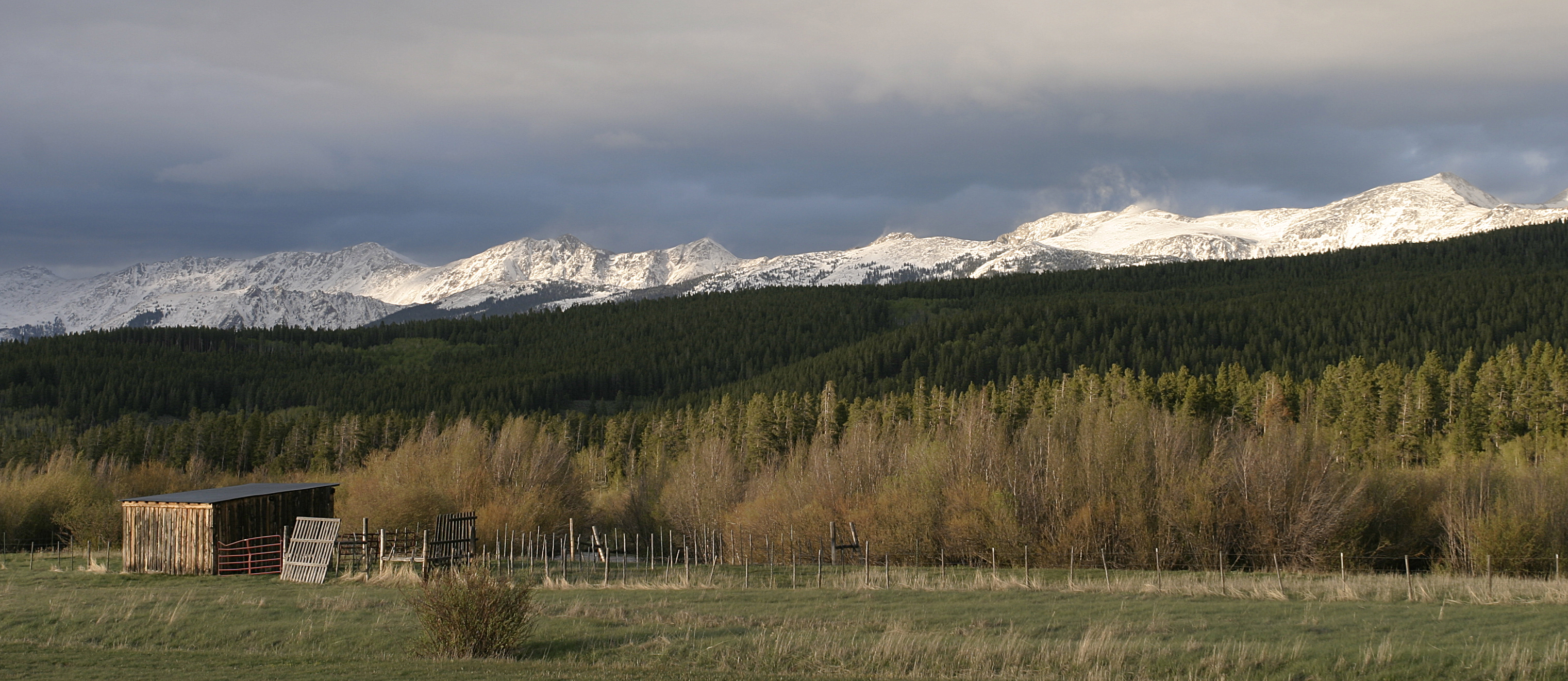
- Rawah Wilderness

- Location within the United States
- Location: Larimer County, Colorado, USA
- Nearest city: Fort Collins, CO
- Coordinates: 40°46′10″N 105°59′22″W
- Area: 76,394 acres (309.16 km^{2})
- Established: 1964
- Governing body: U.S. Forest Service

The Rawah Wilderness is administered by the USDA Forest Service. It is located on the Canyon Lakes Ranger District of the Roosevelt National Forest in Colorado, near the Wyoming border, and also in the Routt National Forest to its south. A wilderness area is defined by law as "an area of undeveloped Federal land retaining its primeval character and influence, without permanent improvements or human habitation, which is protected and managed so as to preserve its natural conditions". All mechanized equipment, including drones, is prohibited in wilderness areas.

The Rawah Wilderness encompasses 76,394 acres (309.16 km^{2}) and includes 25 named lakes ranging in size from five to 39 acres (20,000 to 160,000 m^{2}). There are 85 miles (137 km) of trails in the area and elevation ranges from 8,400 feet (2,600 m) to 13,000 feet (4,000 m). Much of the area is traversed by the Medicine Bow Mountains and the Rawah Range for which it is named. The temperature in the Rawah Wilderness ranges from a low of 5 °F (−15 °C) during the winter and a high of 77 °F (25 °C) during the summer.
