= Mullen Fire =

2020 wildfire in Wyoming and Colorado, United States

- Part of the 2020 Colorado wildfires
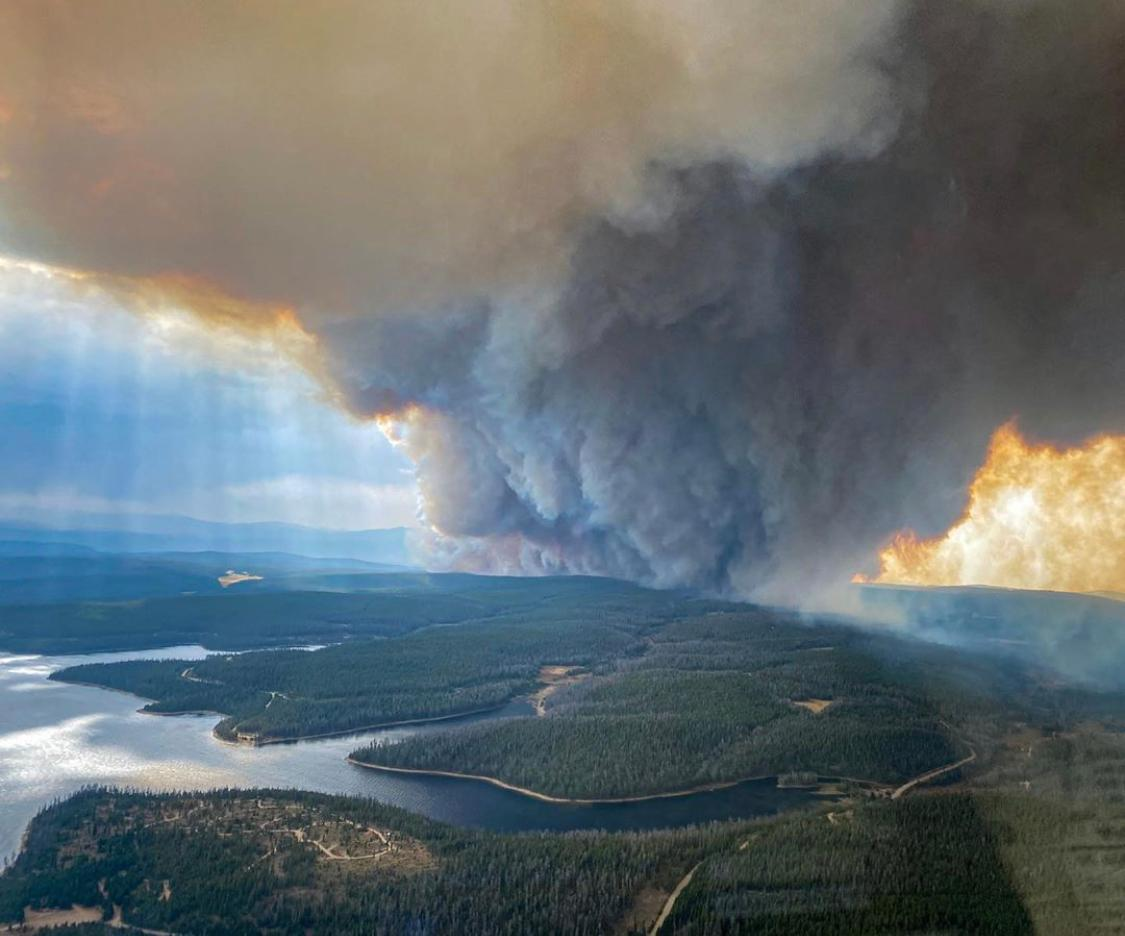
- Date: September 17, 2020 — October 20, 2020
- Location: Carbon, Albany, and Jackson counties

Statistics
- Total area: 176,878 acres (71,580 hectares)

Impacts
- Structures lost: 60

Ignition
- Cause: Under investigation

Map
- Map

Location of Mullen Fire

The Mullen Fire was a wildfire that burned over 176,878 acres (71,580 ha), 28 miles (45 km) west of Laramie, Wyoming. The fire started on September 17, 2020, in the Savage Run Wilderness of Carbon County, and spread to Albany County. On September 30, it spread into Jackson County, Colorado. The cause is still under investigation. It burned close to the Rob Roy Reservoir and Platte River Wilderness.

On October 15, 2020, the fire was estimated to span 25 miles north to south, and 23 miles east to west.

== Gallery ==
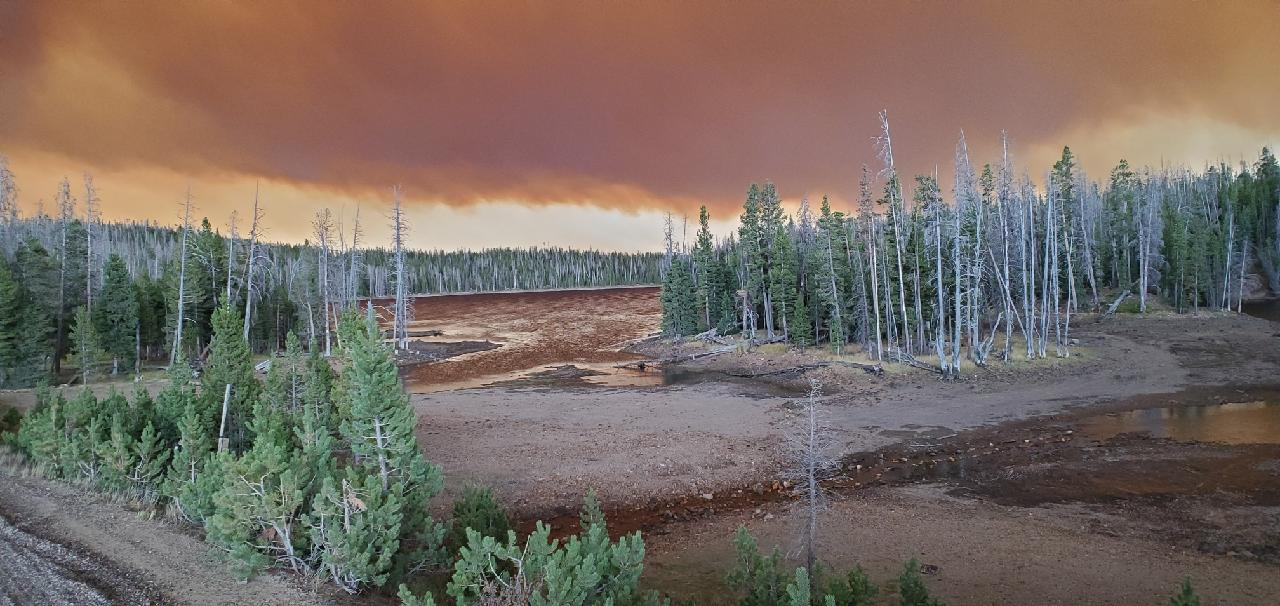
Smoke from the fire.

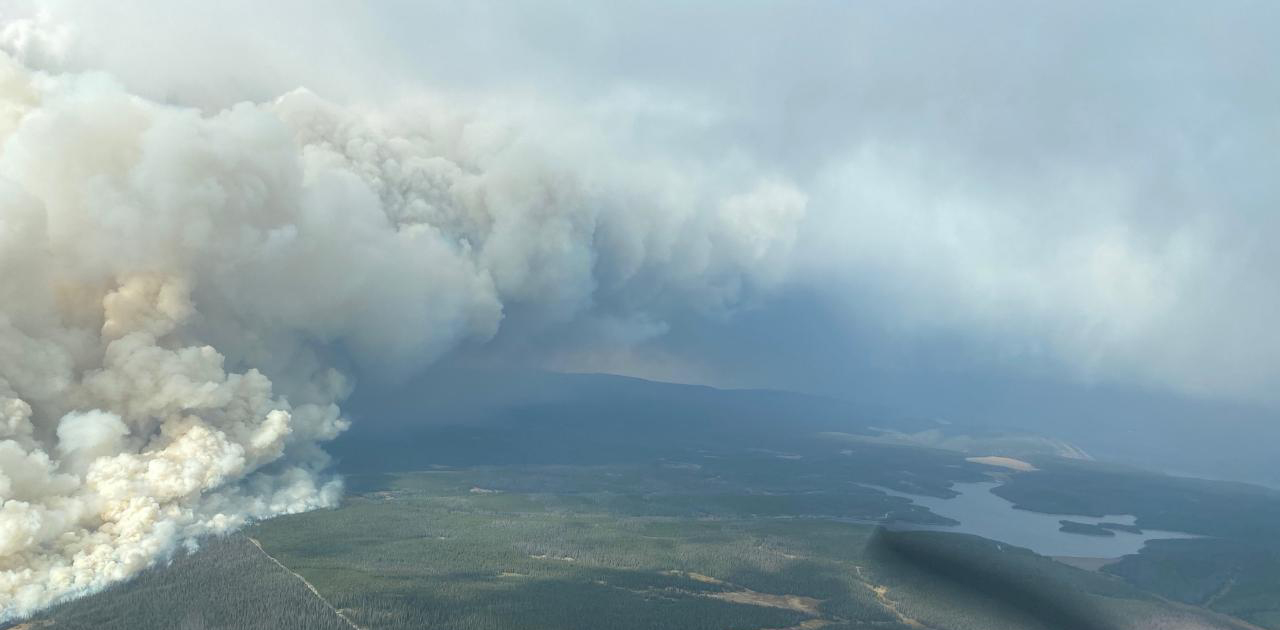
Aerial view of the fire.

== Status ==
The fire jumped into Colorado on September 30. At that time the fire was initially believed to be human-caused, however details remained limited as it was early into the investigation. On January 4, 2021, the fire was 97 percent contained. Cooler temperatures and precipitation were able to slow the fire's growth. 22 structures had been lost.
