= Poudre Wilderness Volunteers =

Group assisting the Canyon Lakes Ranger District

- Formation: 1996; 30 years ago
- Founder: Charles "Chuck" Bell
- Type: Nonprofit
- Tax ID no.: 84-1333391
- Legal status: 501(c)(3)
- Headquarters: Fort Collins, Colorado
- Region served: Arapaho National Forest, Roosevelt National Forest, Pawnee National Grassland
- Board Chair: Sean Orner (2024 – Three Year Term)
- Staff: 0
- Volunteers: 250 to 320
- Website: Official website

Poudre Wilderness Volunteers (PWV) is a nonprofit organization based in Fort Collins, Colorado. Poudre Wilderness Volunteers was founded to assist the to assist the United States Forest Service (USFS) through the Canyon Lakes Ranger District of the Roosevelt National Forest by recruiting and training volunteer wilderness rangers. PWV volunteers help patrol, manage, and protect approximately 650,000 acres of wilderness and backcountry areas within the Roosevelt National Forest and Pawnee National Grassland.

PWV volunteers are required to attend an off-site three-day training session every five years. Once in the field, they are required to perform at least six patrols (hiking, backpacking, horseback) during each field season, which runs from January to September. In addition to conducting patrols, PWV volunteers clear invasive weeds, host at trailheads, and collect forest usage data for the USFS, among other tasks.

The organization relies on structured onboarding, mentoring, and community engagement to support long-term volunteer retention among its wilderness stewards.

== Mission ==
The mission of the Poudre Wilderness Volunteers is to assist the Canyon Lakes Ranger District of the USFS in managing and protecting wilderness and backcountry areas within its jurisdiction. The PWV trains citizen volunteers as wilderness rangers and provides education to the public.

== History ==
PWV was co-founded by Charles "Chuck" Bell and Art Bunn. Bell, a retired USFS officer, began volunteering in 1993 as a ranger in the Redfeather Lakes Ranger District, which was later consolidated into the Canyon Lakes Ranger District. Between 1993 and 1995, USFS coverage in the area now patrolled by PWV was reduced from 30 seasonal employees to two, prompting Bell to organize a volunteer corps.

== Kids in Nature ==
The Kids In Nature (KIN) project is an environmental education program aimed at familiarizing children with nature.

The project's goals are to:

- Connect kids with nature via hands-on experiences
- Educate kids about natural processes, wild animals, and plants
- Encourage kids to respect natural areas and practice land stewardship
- Introduce kids to selected outdoor skills
- Encourage kids to interact with natural environments

The KIN program provides ranger-guided hikes with organizations and established groups. PWV leads small groups of children with their adult leaders or adult family members, introducing them to the USFS land and teaching basic Leave No Trace skills as well as trail safety. PWV also holds in-town sessions in Fort Collins.

== Trails and Trail Information ==
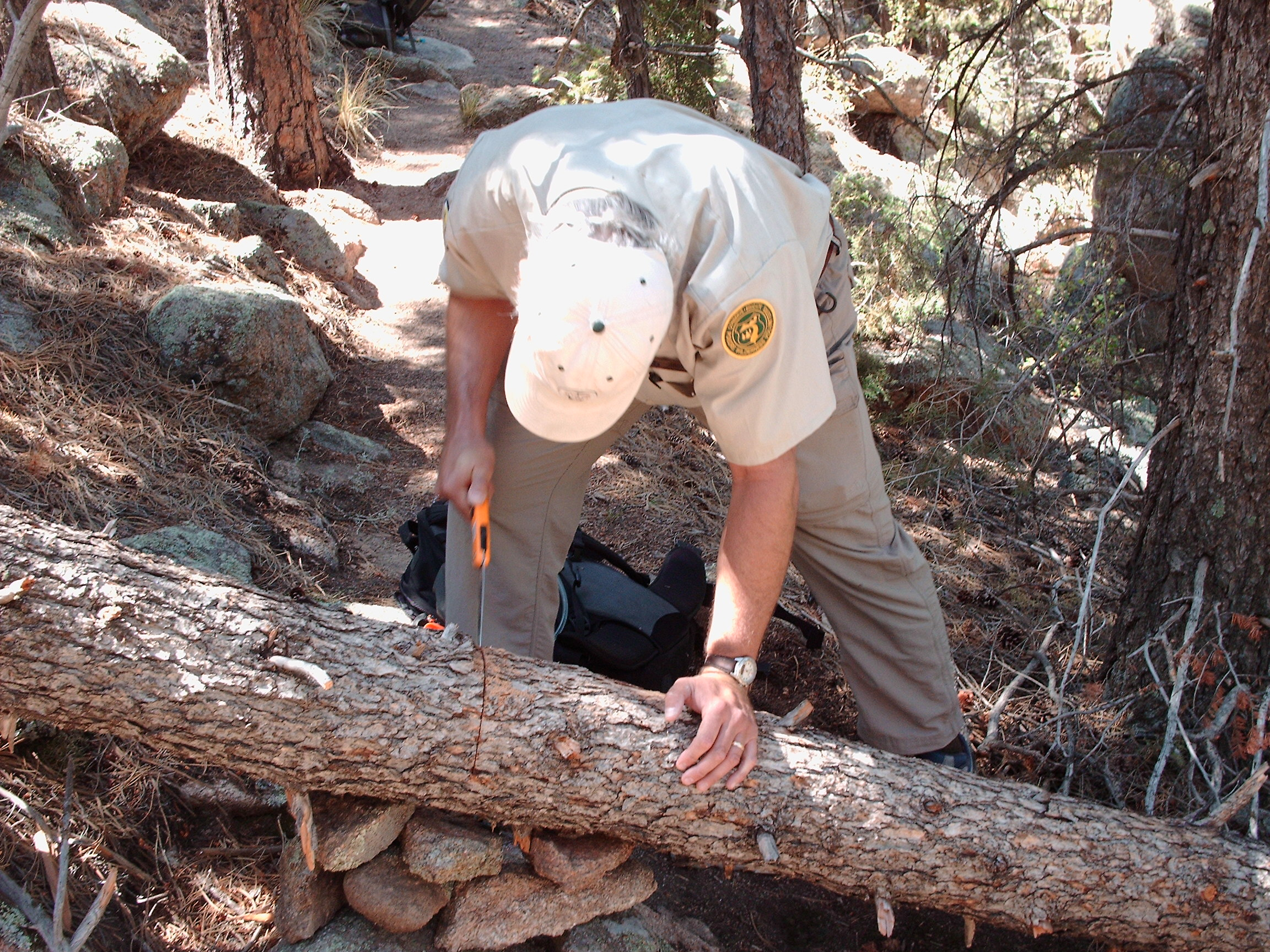
A PWV volunteer helps clear a tree blocking the Grey Rock trail

PWV maintains trail pages for 58 trails, organized by region and interest, providing maps, elevation profiles, and points of interest. They also provide trail condition reports.

== Restoration Work ==
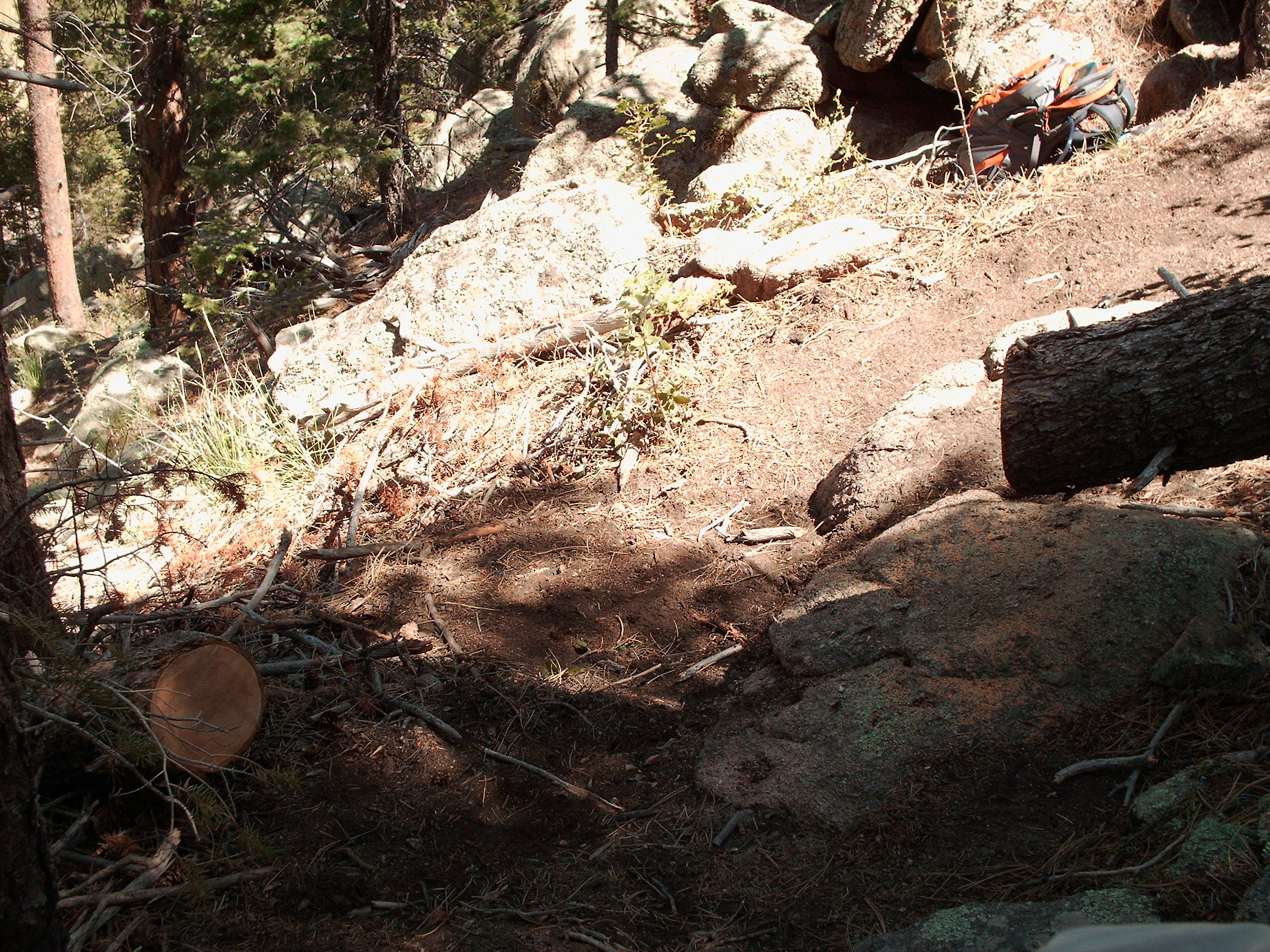
Tree removed from Grey Rock trail

The 2020 Cameron Peak Fire destroyed over 209,000 acres of the Roosevelt National Forest, leading to multiple trails in the area being damaged or destroyed. In 2021, PWV launched a new initiative to restore trails lost in the fire. More than 200 members of the public and 50 PWV members participated in restoration workdays held by the PWV, totaling over 1,800 hours of trail work. PWV members did an additional 26 workdays in the affected area.

As a result of these efforts:

- 3,000 fallen trees were removed
- 60 miles of trail were cleared of brush and limbs
- 11 miles of drainage work on the tread was completed

Results in 2022 were similar.

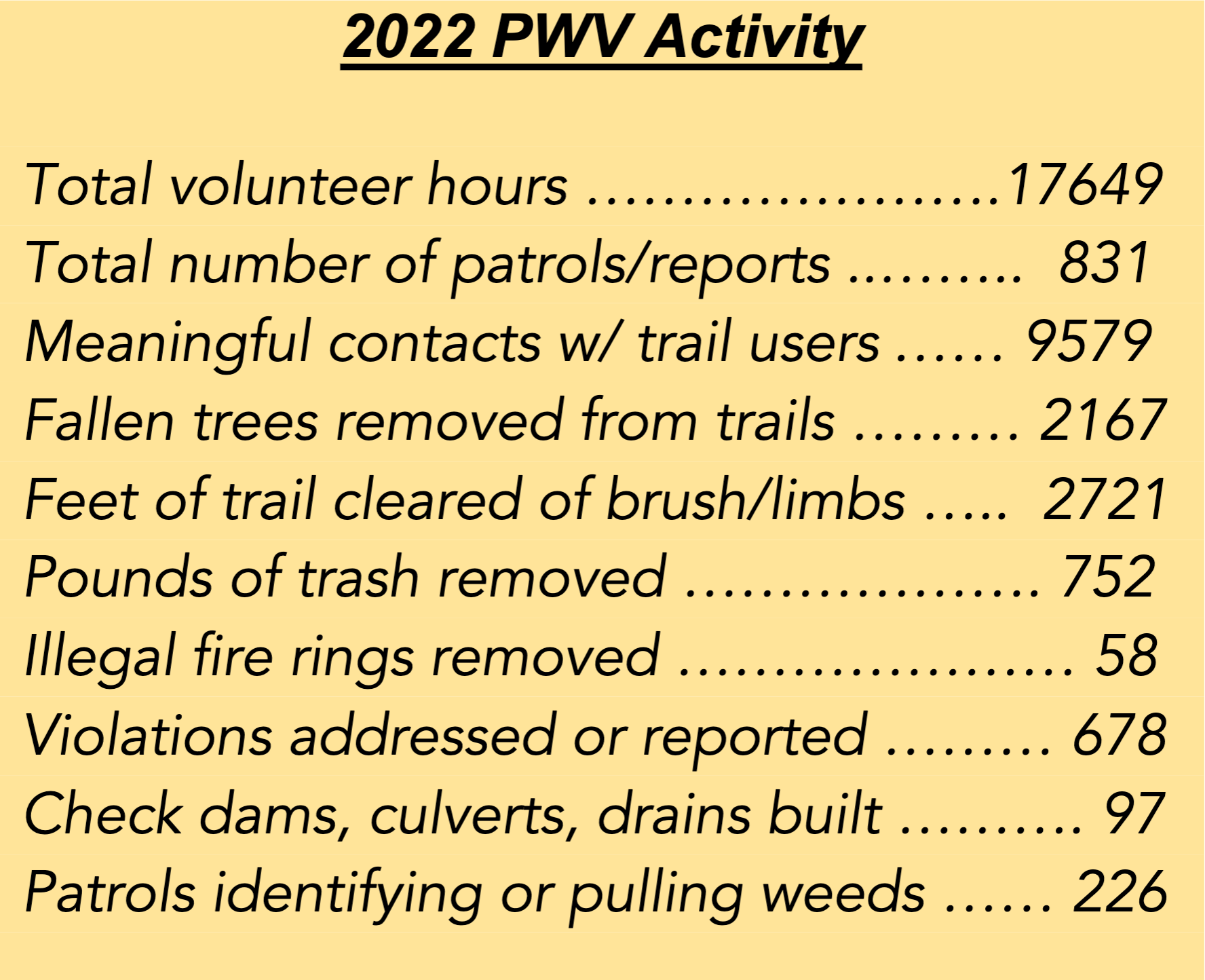
2022 PWV Fact Sheet, as reported by the organization in 2023

== Media and awards ==
Larimer County awarded PWV the 2009 Environmental Stewardship Award on December 6, 2009, the 2020 Environmental Stewardship Award for its Kids in Nature program in 2020, and the 2022 Environmental Stewardship Award in 2022.
