= Medicine Bow–Routt National Forest =

U.S. Forest Service managed area

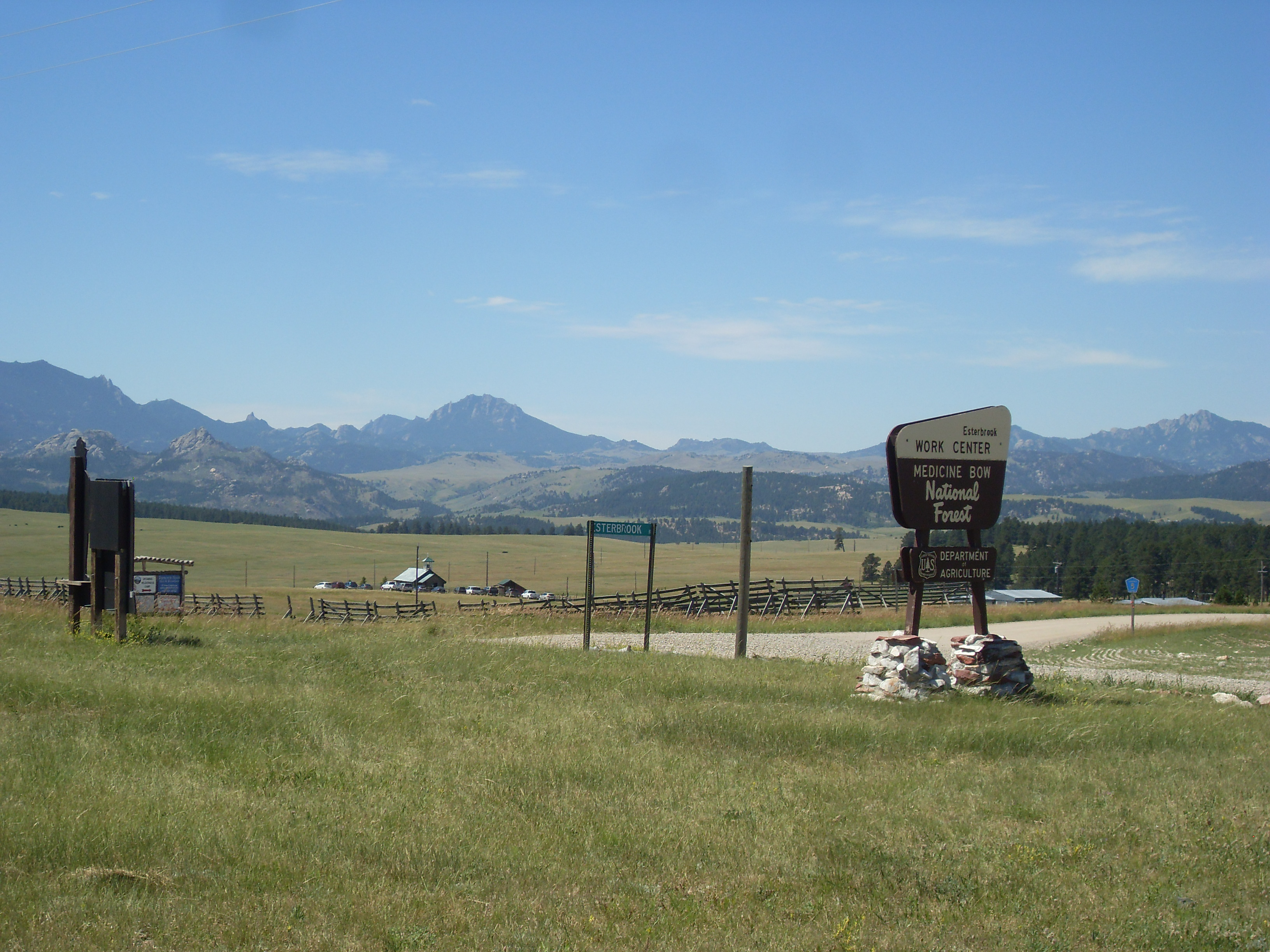
- Medicine Bow National Forest

- Location within the United States
- Location: Wyoming-Colorado, U.S.
- Nearest city: Cheyenne, WY
- Coordinates: 41°35′N 106°13′W
- Area: 2,222,313 acres (8,993.38 km^{2})
- Established: May 22, 1902
- Governing body: U.S. Forest Service
- Website: Medicine Bow–Routt National Forest

Medicine Bow–Routt National Forest is the official title to a U.S. Forest Service managed area extending over 2,222,313 acres (8,993.38 km^{2}) in the states of Wyoming and Colorado, United States. What were once three separate areas, Medicine Bow National Forest, Routt National Forest, and Thunder Basin National Grassland were administratively combined in 1995 due to similarity of the resources, proximity to each other and for administrative purposes.

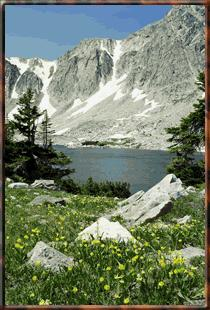
The Snowy Range in Medicine Bow–Routt National Forest

The Medicine Bow National Forest section (1,096,891 acres) is located in southeastern Wyoming and was originally created as a forest reserve in 1902. It was named after the Native American powwows in which numerous tribes would congregate here in search of mountain mahogany, which was an excellent wood for the manufacturing of bows, and to perform rituals hoped to cure diseases and thus make "good medicine". Areas of interest include the Snowy Range where the highest peak is Medicine Bow Peak at 12,013 feet (3,662 m) and is visible from Snowy Range Pass, 10,847 ft (3,306 m), on Wyoming highway 130. The Encampment River, Huston Park, Savage Run and Platte River Wildernesses are all located within the Medicine Bow portion of the National Forest. (A small part of the Platte River Wilderness extending into Colorado is shared with Routt National Forest, as indicated below.) Vedauwoo is located immediately north of Interstate 80 and consists of numerous rock outcroppings popular with rock climbers. In descending order of land area the forest is located in Carbon, Albany, Converse, Natrona, and Platte counties. There are local ranger district offices located in Laramie, Saratoga, and Douglas.

Routt National Forest lands (1,125,438 acres) are located in northwestern Colorado. The Steamboat Ski Resort is located in the forest, on Mount Werner. The forest is named after John Routt, the first Governor of Colorado. It was established in 1905 by President Theodore Roosevelt. The forest encompasses 1,126,346 acres (4,558.16 km^{2}). The Continental Divide divides the forest in half, with the eastern part drained by the North Platte River and the west drained by the Yampa River. Routt National Forest contains seven wilderness areas entirely or partially within it. Entirely within Routt are the Mount Zirkel and the Sarvis Creek Wildernesses. Lying mostly within neighboring forests but extending into Routt are the Flat Tops (White River NF 83.5%), Neota (Roosevelt NF 97.3%), Never Summer (Arapaho NF 68.4%), Platte River (Medicine Bow NF 96.8%), and Rawah (Roosevelt NF 98.0%) Wildernesses. In descending order of land area the forest is located in Routt, Jackson, Rio Blanco, Grand, Moffat, and Garfield counties. There are local ranger district offices located in Steamboat Springs, Walden, and Yampa.

Thunder Basin National Grassland (547,620 acres) is located in northeastern Wyoming and consists primarily of lands leased to cattle interests. In descending order of land area the grassland is located in Weston, Converse, Campbell, Niobrara, and Crook counties. There are local ranger district offices located in Douglas.

The forest headquarters is in Laramie, Wyoming.

== Climate ==
There is a weather station by Sand Lake (Wyoming), about 5 miles (8 km) north of Medicine Bow Peak. Sand Lake has a subalpine climate (Köppen Dfc).

Climate data for Sand Lake, Wyoming (10050ft or 3063m), 1991–2020 normals, extremes 1988–present
Month	Jan	Feb	Mar	Apr	May	Jun	Jul	Aug	Sep	Oct	Nov	Dec	Year
Record high °F (°C)	47 (8)	47 (8)	59 (15)	64 (18)	72 (22)	76 (24)	85 (29)	80 (27)	74 (23)	64 (18)	53 (12)	55 (13)	85 (29)
Mean maximum °F (°C)	35.9 (2.2)	39.8 (4.3)	49.4 (9.7)	57.2 (14.0)	64.2 (17.9)	71.0 (21.7)	75.7 (24.3)	73.6 (23.1)	68.6 (20.3)	57.8 (14.3)	45.8 (7.7)	37.5 (3.1)	76.4 (24.7)
Mean daily maximum °F (°C)	22.1 (−5.5)	25.1 (−3.8)	33.5 (0.8)	40.3 (4.6)	50.1 (10.1)	59.9 (15.5)	67.4 (19.7)	65.2 (18.4)	56.1 (13.4)	42.2 (5.7)	30.1 (−1.1)	22.3 (−5.4)	42.9 (6.0)
Daily mean °F (°C)	15.1 (−9.4)	16.7 (−8.5)	23.7 (−4.6)	29.4 (−1.4)	38.5 (3.6)	46.9 (8.3)	54.0 (12.2)	52.3 (11.3)	44.8 (7.1)	33.4 (0.8)	22.6 (−5.2)	15.3 (−9.3)	32.7 (0.4)
Mean daily minimum °F (°C)	8.0 (−13.3)	8.2 (−13.2)	13.7 (−10.2)	18.5 (−7.5)	26.9 (−2.8)	33.9 (1.1)	40.5 (4.7)	39.3 (4.1)	33.4 (0.8)	24.4 (−4.2)	15.1 (−9.4)	8.2 (−13.2)	22.5 (−5.3)
Mean minimum °F (°C)	−12.2 (−24.6)	−11.7 (−24.3)	−6.1 (−21.2)	1.2 (−17.1)	11.3 (−11.5)	25.4 (−3.7)	32.4 (0.2)	30.9 (−0.6)	21.0 (−6.1)	5.7 (−14.6)	−5.5 (−20.8)	−12.6 (−24.8)	−17.4 (−27.4)
Record low °F (°C)	−25 (−32)	−25 (−32)	−14 (−26)	−8 (−22)	−2 (−19)	18 (−8)	24 (−4)	23 (−5)	7 (−14)	−13 (−25)	−19 (−28)	−26 (−32)	−26 (−32)
Average precipitation inches (mm)	4.33 (110)	4.15 (105)	4.71 (120)	5.71 (145)	4.24 (108)	2.36 (60)	1.58 (40)	1.24 (31)	2.14 (54)	3.46 (88)	3.72 (94)	4.12 (105)	41.76 (1,060)
Average extreme snow depth inches (cm)	70.1 (178)	84.7 (215)	98.9 (251)	102.3 (260)	91.9 (233)	56.8 (144)	4.9 (12)	0.1 (0.25)	2.7 (6.9)	19.8 (50)	36.9 (94)	54.9 (139)	105.7 (268)
Average precipitation days (≥ 0.01 in)	18.3	17.2	18.1	18.2	14.6	9.3	7.0	6.9	9.6	12.1	14.5	16.7	162.5
Source 1: XMACIS2 (snow depth 2006–2020)
Source 2: NOAA (Precipitation)

North French Creek is another weather station located near Medicine Bow Peak, roughly 4 miles (6.4 km) southwest of the peak and 10 miles (16.1 km) from Sand Lake.

Climate data for North French Creek, Wyoming, 1991–2020 normals, 1988-2020 extremes: 10130ft (3088m)
Month	Jan	Feb	Mar	Apr	May	Jun	Jul	Aug	Sep	Oct	Nov	Dec	Year
Record high °F (°C)	48 (9)	48 (9)	57 (14)	68 (20)	72 (22)	81 (27)	86 (30)	92 (33)	79 (26)	71 (22)	58 (14)	48 (9)	92 (33)
Mean maximum °F (°C)	38.9 (3.8)	39.5 (4.2)	47.8 (8.8)	57.1 (13.9)	64.0 (17.8)	71.8 (22.1)	78.7 (25.9)	75.8 (24.3)	71.0 (21.7)	58.9 (14.9)	46.1 (7.8)	36.7 (2.6)	79.4 (26.3)
Mean daily maximum °F (°C)	23.3 (−4.8)	25.6 (−3.6)	33.3 (0.7)	40.2 (4.6)	50.0 (10.0)	60.4 (15.8)	69.4 (20.8)	66.8 (19.3)	57.5 (14.2)	42.7 (5.9)	29.7 (−1.3)	22.2 (−5.4)	43.2 (6.2)
Daily mean °F (°C)	14.8 (−9.6)	16.4 (−8.7)	23.0 (−5.0)	29.1 (−1.6)	38.8 (3.8)	47.6 (8.7)	55.8 (13.2)	54.2 (12.3)	46.1 (7.8)	33.3 (0.7)	21.1 (−6.1)	14.1 (−9.9)	32.5 (0.3)
Mean daily minimum °F (°C)	6.3 (−14.3)	7.1 (−13.8)	12.6 (−10.8)	18.1 (−7.7)	27.4 (−2.6)	35.0 (1.7)	42.3 (5.7)	41.3 (5.2)	34.0 (1.1)	23.5 (−4.7)	12.7 (−10.7)	6.0 (−14.4)	22.0 (−5.6)
Mean minimum °F (°C)	−12.5 (−24.7)	−10.7 (−23.7)	−5.0 (−20.6)	2.3 (−16.5)	11.7 (−11.3)	23.8 (−4.6)	33.5 (0.8)	31.6 (−0.2)	20.3 (−6.5)	5.8 (−14.6)	−6.6 (−21.4)	−13.1 (−25.1)	−17.4 (−27.4)
Record low °F (°C)	−27 (−33)	−30 (−34)	−23 (−31)	−15 (−26)	−1 (−18)	11 (−12)	19 (−7)	11 (−12)	7 (−14)	−25 (−32)	−26 (−32)	−37 (−38)	−37 (−38)
Average precipitation inches (mm)	5.24 (133)	4.55 (116)	4.65 (118)	5.63 (143)	4.26 (108)	2.09 (53)	1.55 (39)	1.57 (40)	2.37 (60)	3.46 (88)	4.15 (105)	4.61 (117)	44.13 (1,120)
Source 1: XMACIS2
Source 2: NOAA (Precipitation)

== See also ==
- Medicine Bow Mountains
- List of national forests of the United States
