= Comanche Peak Wilderness =

Wilderness area in Colorado, United States

- IUCN category Ib (wilderness area)
- Location within the United States
- Location: Larimer County, Colorado, USA
- Nearest city: Fort Collins, Colorado
- Coordinates: 40°34′58″N 105°40′07″W
- Area: 66,791 acres (27,029 ha)
- Established: 1980
- Governing body: U.S. Forest Service

The Comanche Peak Wilderness is a U.S. Wilderness Area located in the Roosevelt National Forest on the Canyon Lakes Ranger District in Colorado along the northern boundary of Rocky Mountain National Park. The 66,791-acre (27,029 ha) wilderness was established in 1980 and named after its most prominent peak. There are 121 miles (195 km) of hiking trails inside the wilderness. Roosevelt National Forest and Rocky Mountain National Park officially maintain 19 trails within the Wilderness, 5 of which pass into Rocky Mountain National Park. There are also 7 named peaks, 6 named lakes (including Comanche Reservoir) and 16 named rivers and creeks within the wilderness boundaries.

== Climate ==
Climate data for Comanche Peak 40.5502 N, 105.6841 W, Elevation: 12,507 ft (3,812 m) (1991–2020 normals)
Month	Jan	Feb	Mar	Apr	May	Jun	Jul	Aug	Sep	Oct	Nov	Dec	Year
Mean daily maximum °F (°C)	19.0 (−7.2)	19.1 (−7.2)	26.1 (−3.3)	33.3 (0.7)	42.7 (5.9)	54.3 (12.4)	60.5 (15.8)	58.4 (14.7)	51.6 (10.9)	39.9 (4.4)	26.1 (−3.3)	19.3 (−7.1)	37.5 (3.1)
Daily mean °F (°C)	10.9 (−11.7)	10.6 (−11.9)	16.7 (−8.5)	22.6 (−5.2)	31.9 (−0.1)	42.8 (6.0)	49.5 (9.7)	47.6 (8.7)	40.8 (4.9)	29.8 (−1.2)	18.2 (−7.7)	11.3 (−11.5)	27.7 (−2.4)
Mean daily minimum °F (°C)	2.9 (−16.2)	2.2 (−16.6)	7.2 (−13.8)	12.0 (−11.1)	21.0 (−6.1)	31.2 (−0.4)	38.4 (3.6)	36.8 (2.7)	30.0 (−1.1)	19.7 (−6.8)	10.4 (−12.0)	3.2 (−16.0)	17.9 (−7.8)
Average precipitation inches (mm)	4.81 (122)	5.06 (129)	4.85 (123)	6.07 (154)	4.69 (119)	1.92 (49)	2.45 (62)	2.25 (57)	2.39 (61)	3.60 (91)	4.45 (113)	4.64 (118)	47.18 (1,198)
Source: PRISM Climate Group
