= Troublesome Valley =

Valley in West Virginia, United States

Coordinates: 38°40′6″N 79°15′29″W

Troublesome Valley [elevation: 2,260 feet (690 m)] is a valley in Pendleton County, West Virginia, in the United States.

Troublesome Valley has been noted for its unusual place name.
