= Neota Wilderness =

Wilderness area in Colorado, United States

- IUCN category Ib (wilderness area)
- Location within the United States
- Location: Larimer County, Colorado, USA
- Nearest city: Fort Collins, CO
- Coordinates: 40°31′22″N 105°49′57″W
- Area: 9,924 acres (40.16 km^{2})
- Established: 1980
- Governing body: U.S. Forest Service

The Neota Wilderness is administered by the USDA Forest Service. It is located on the Canyon Lakes Ranger District of the Roosevelt National Forest in Colorado. This wilderness area encompasses 9,924 acres (40 km^{2}) and is bordered on the south by Rocky Mountain National Park. Elevation ranges from 10,000 ft (3,000 m) to 11,896 ft (3,626 m) in the Rocky Mountains. There are only 1.5 miles (2.4 km) of trail in this area.
