= Troublesome Creek (Clinch River tributary) =

Stream in Lee and Scott County, Virginia, U.S.

Coordinates: 36°38′52.35″N 82°45′1.58″W

Troublesome Creek is a stream in Lee and Scott counties, Virginia, in the United States. It is a tributary of the Clinch River.

Troublesome Creek was named by pioneers on the Wilderness Road.

== See also ==
- List of rivers of Virginia
