= Platte River Wilderness =

Protected wilderness area in Wyoming, US

- IUCN category Ib (wilderness area)
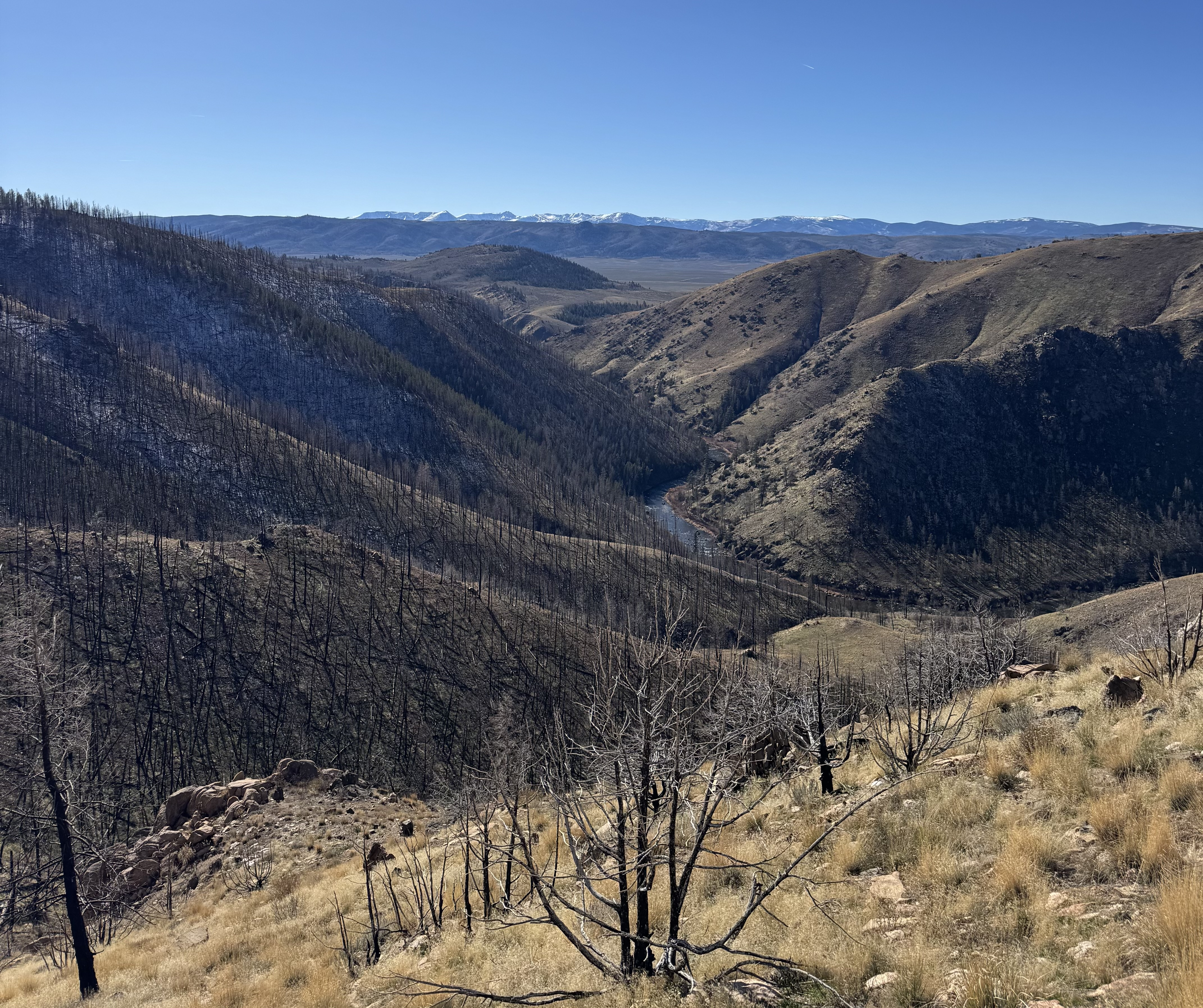
- The North Platte River looking southwest toward Six Mile Gap.

- Location within Wyoming Location within Colorado Location within the United States
- Location: Carbon / Albany counties, Wyoming / Jackson County, Colorado, USA
- Nearest city: Rawlins, WY
- Coordinates: 41°05′N 106°21′W
- Area: 23,492 acres (95.07 km^{2})
- Established: 1984
- Governing body: U.S. Forest Service

The Platte River Wilderness is a 23,492-acre (95.07 km^{2}) protected wilderness area within the Medicine Bow-Routt National Forest. Split between southern Wyoming and northern Colorado, the Wilderness was designated in 1984 by the Wyoming Wilderness Act. The Wyoming portion (22,749 acres) lies within Medicine Bow National Forest, while the Colorado section (743 acres) is in Routt National Forest; since 1995, these two areas have been administratively combined.

== Recreation ==
There are multiple types of recreation activities available, including camping and hiking, hunting, white-water rafting (the Northgate Canyon route runs through the area), and fishing. The Wyoming Game and Fish Department considers the North Platte a blue ribon fishery for its entire length through the wilderness in Wyoming, and Colorado Parks and Wildlife has designated the North Platte in the Colorado section as a Gold Medal water.

== Mullen Fire ==
The conifer forests in the area were almost entirely consumed by the Mullen Fire in 2020. Despite the extensive burn area, the resulting mosaic of burned and unburned areas created improved habitat for elk, mule deer, and bighorn sheep.
