= LANDFIRE =

The LANDFIRE Program (“Landscape Fire and Resource Management Planning Tools") produces geo-spatial products and databases covering the United States. LANDFIRE is a partnership between the wildland fire management programs of the United States Department of Interior, the USDA Forest Service and the Nature Conservancy. LANDFIRE was chartered to create a nationally complete, comprehensive, and consistent set of products that support cross-country planning, and fire and natural resource management. This multi-partner Program produces consistent, comprehensive, geospatial data and databases that describe vegetation, wildland fuel, and fire regimes across the United States and insular areas. LANDFIRE's mission is to provide agency leaders and managers with a common "all-lands" data set of vegetation and wildland fire/fuels information for strategic fire and resource management planning and analysis.

LANDFIRE spatial products were designed for use at very large landscape, state, regional or national scales. LANDFIRE Program products have been used in a variety of ways, from supporting large federal wildland fire-related applications such as the Wildland Fire Decision Support System, and the Cohesive Strategy initiative, to landscape-level conservation planning, regional wildlife studies, ecosystem services, biofuels, and national carbon stock and biomass assessments. The LANDFIRE Program and the Nature Conservancy’s Conservation Gateway and Web-Hosted Applications Map websites list and describe a variety of applications of LANDFIRE products.

LANDFIRE began as a prototype in 2002 and was officially chartered in 2004 by the Wildland Fire Leadership Council (WFLC). In 2017 the United States Department of the Interior presented LANDFIRE with its Environmental Achievement Award, naming it the year's "Environmental Dream Team" in recognition for being "environmental champions and agents of change who work across organizational boundaries to enhance environmental stewardship, create efficiencies, improve communication, avoid or address conflict at the lowest levels, or reduce environmental review times."

== Products ==
LANDFIRE comprises three primary areas of work: digital spatial data, quantitative vegetation dynamics models and a small number of user tools.

=== Spatial Data ===
The LANDFIRE Program product set includes a suite of more than 20, 30-meter spatial resolution raster data sets that cover the entire nation, regardless of ownership. A subset of LANDFIRE products is available for U.S. insular areas. The data sets are created using a consistent set of processes and inputs. They are fully compatible with each other, and are ready to use immediately after being downloaded. All layers are freely available from the LANDFIRE Program website and are delivered as continuous national mosaics, or as Web Service Calls in Arc GRID format. Data are also available in Arc GRID and Geo Tiff formats for user specified areas through the LANDFIRE Data Distribution Site. The layer suite includes existing vegetation type, cover and height, potential vegetation (Environmental Site Potential), pre-European settlement vegetation (Biophysical Setting, or BpS), fire regime group, fire behavior fuel models, fire effects, natural and human-caused disturbance, vegetation transition rules, and others.

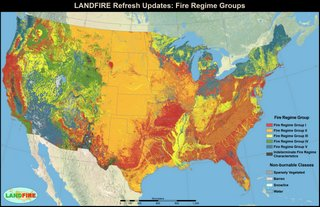
LANDFIRE's Fire Regime Group Map

=== Ecological Models ===
LANDFIRE offers a series of free vegetation dynamics models and descriptions that quantitatively describe the pre-European settlement succession and disturbance pathways for each major Ecological System in the U.S. The descriptions are available as PDF and Word files; the ecological models are delivered as a database to be used with SyncroSim. LANDFIRE models and descriptions are used in the Landscape Conservation Forecasting process, Forest Scenario Modeling and other on-the-ground decision-making efforts.

=== Tools ===
LANDFIRE partners create powerful tools and resources to support applications of LANDFIRE and other spatial data sets. For instance, the LANDFIRE Total Fuels Change Tool allows users to review how Fire Behavior Fuel Models are derived. The LANDFIRE Data Access Tool (LFDAT) enables users to download and process LANDFIRE spatial data directly from ArcMap.

== Versions and update schedule ==
Currently, LANDFIRE has delivered five data versions representing four distinct time periods available for public download on the Program website. LF1.0.5 provides data circa 2001. Updates from 2001-2008 were identified and incorporated into LF1.0.5 to create LF1.1.0 representing conditions in 2008. Landscape changes from 2008 to 2010 were mapped and incorporated to create LF1.2.0 (2010) and LF1.3.0 (2012) respectively. Most recently, the LANDFIRE Program delivered another updated data set (1.4.0) The latest versions may be downloaded, with older versions available upon request. The LANDFIRE Program is currently recreating most products, called LANDFIRE Remap, which will represent landscape conditions at the end of 2016. Products will be released incrementally with completion in the Continental US expected in early 2020. Alaska, Hawai’i and Island Territories releases follow later that year.

== Review and Update ==
The LANDFIRE Program encourages and welcomes feedback on any product of the Program at any time from any organization or individual. Formal review requests are distributed occasionally. For example, LANDFIRE announces "Data Calls" frequently. In 2017, LANDFIRE requested new imagery and new vegetation/fuel plot data to reflect contemporary conditions, so that geospatial landscape data are as reflective of on the ground conditions as possible, with the primary focus on collecting polygon disturbance and treatment activities. Also, between 2016-2018 The Nature Conservancy’s LANDFIRE Team conducted a formal, Program-wide review of BpS Models and Descriptions, and the LANDFIRE Program has created a web environment that allows users to provide direct feedback on Fire Behavior Fuel Model (FBFM) products.
