= Roosevelt National Forest =

National forest located in north central Colorado

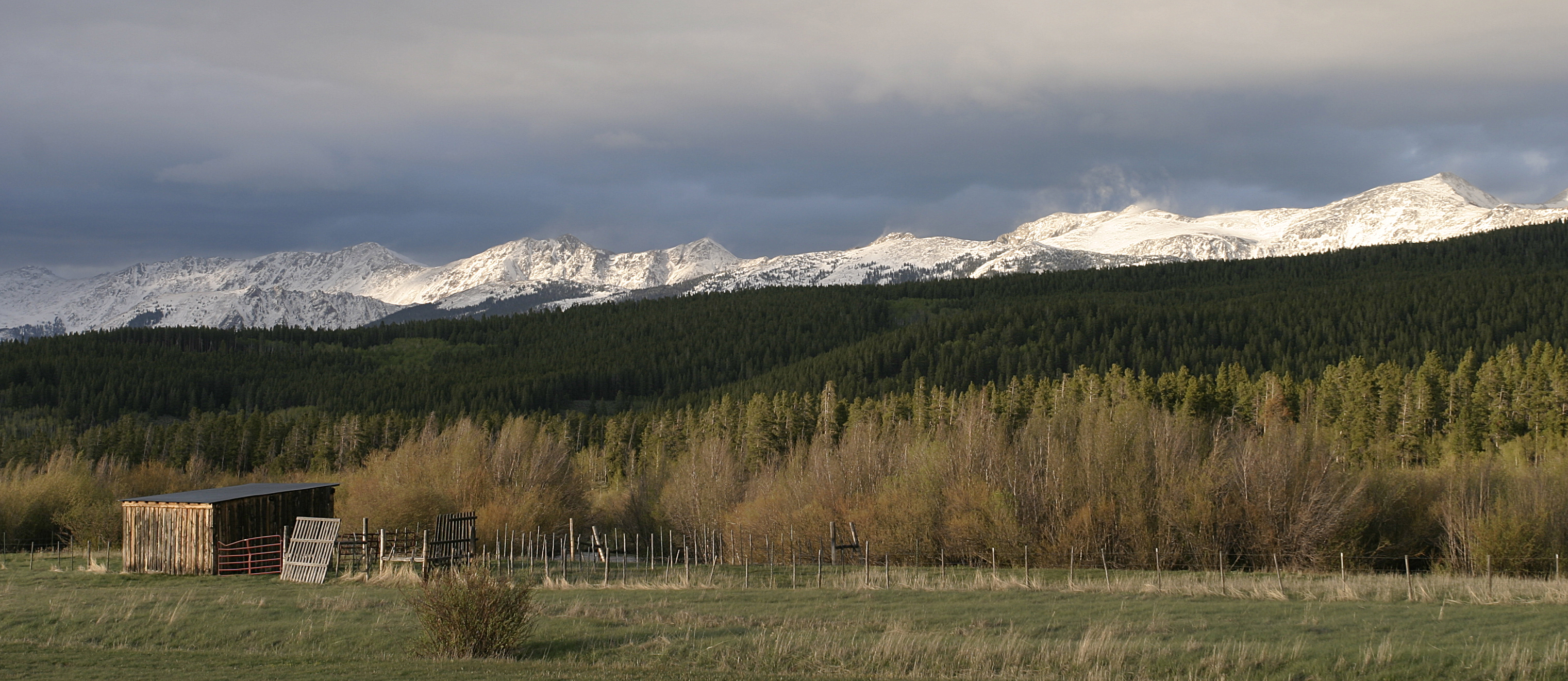

- Location within the United States
- Location: Colorado, United States
- Nearest city: Fort Collins, CO
- Coordinates: 40°42′32″N 105°34′52″W
- Area: 813,799 acres (3,293.33 km^{2})
- Established: May 22, 1902; 124 years ago
- Named for: Theodore Roosevelt
- Governing body: U.S. Forest Service
- Website: Arapaho & Roosevelt National Forests and Pawnee National Grassland

The Roosevelt National Forest is a national forest located in north central Colorado. It is contiguous with the Colorado State Forest as well as the Arapaho National Forest and the Routt National Forest. The forest is administered jointly with the Arapaho National Forest and the Pawnee National Grassland from offices in Fort Collins, and is denoted by the United States Forest Service as ARP (Arapaho, Roosevelt, Pawnee).

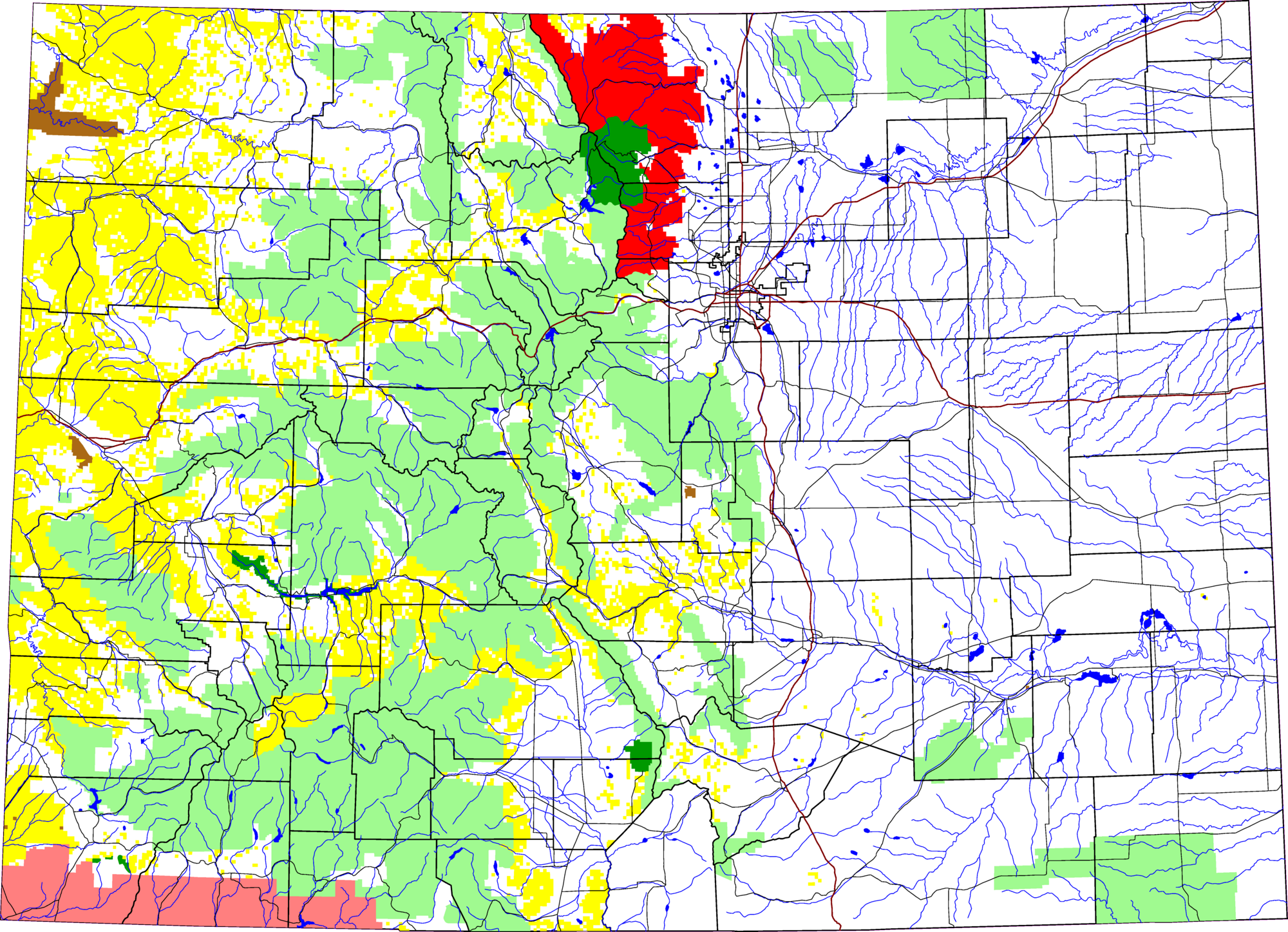
Map of Colorado. The area of the Roosevelt National Forest is in red.

The forest encompasses a mountainous area of the foothills on the eastern side of the Continental Divide of the Front Range in Larimer County and Boulder County. In Larimer County it includes the upper valleys of the Cache la Poudre and Big Thompson Rivers. It includes forested areas along both sides of the Poudre Canyon and along the north and east sides of Rocky Mountain National Park. Smaller parts of the forest also extend into northern Gilpin and extreme northwestern Jefferson counties.

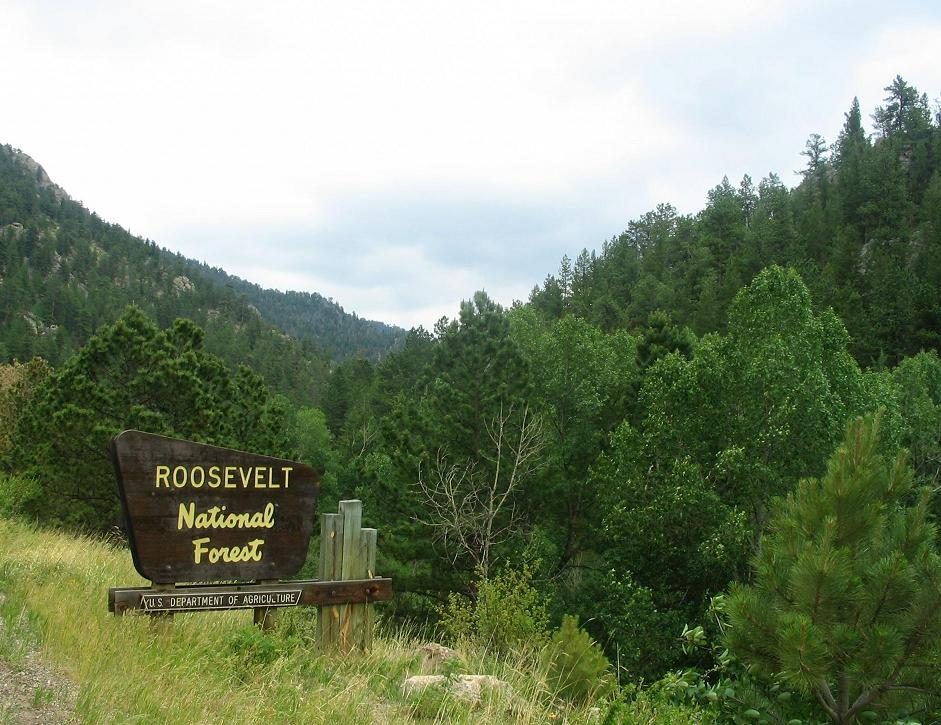
Entrance to Roosevelt National Forest near Estes Park, Colorado.

The Roosevelt National Forest is divided into two ranger districts, the Canyon Lakes Ranger District, with offices in Fort Collins, and the Boulder Ranger District, with offices in Boulder.

The Roosevelt National Forest began on May 22, 1902 as part of the Medicine Bow Forest Reserve. It was renamed the Colorado National Forest in 1910, and was renamed to honor President Theodore Roosevelt in 1932.

The forest has a total area of 813,799 acres (1,271.56 sq mi, or 3,293.33 km^{2}).

Several volunteer groups work with the US Forest Service to help manage the Roosevelt National Forest, including the Poudre Wilderness Volunteers.

== Wilderness areas ==
There are six officially designated wilderness areas lying within Roosevelt National Forest that are part of the National Wilderness Preservation System. Four of them extend into neighboring National Forests, and one of these also onto National Park Service land (as indicated).

- Cache La Poudre Wilderness, 14.47 square miles
- Comanche Peak Wilderness, 104.4 square miles
- Indian Peaks Wilderness, 119.9 square miles (mostly in Arapaho NF; partly in Rocky Mountain National Park)
- James Peak Wilderness, 26.59 square miles (partly in Arapaho NF)
- Neota Wilderness, 15.51 square miles (partly in Routt NF)
- Rawah Wilderness, 119.4 square miles (partly in Routt NF)

== Climate ==
According to the Köppen Climate Classification system, Hourglass Reservoir has a subarctic climate, abbreviated "Dfc" on climate maps. The hottest temperature recorded at Hourglass Reservoir was 91 °F (32.8 °C) on July 8, 1989, while the coldest temperature recorded was −33 °F (−36.1 °C) on February 2, 2011.

Climate data for Hourglass Reservoir, Colorado, 1991–2020 normals, extremes 1988–2021. Elevation: 9,520 ft (2,900 m)
Month	Jan	Feb	Mar	Apr	May	Jun	Jul	Aug	Sep	Oct	Nov	Dec	Year
Record high °F (°C)	58 (14)	57 (14)	66 (19)	69 (21)	79 (26)	88 (31)	91 (33)	87 (31)	85 (29)	75 (24)	68 (20)	60 (16)	91 (33)
Mean maximum °F (°C)	48.3 (9.1)	48.5 (9.2)	55.4 (13.0)	61.0 (16.1)	71.2 (21.8)	80.4 (26.9)	84.0 (28.9)	81.0 (27.2)	76.9 (24.9)	68.1 (20.1)	56.0 (13.3)	47.6 (8.7)	84.6 (29.2)
Mean daily maximum °F (°C)	31.0 (−0.6)	32.7 (0.4)	40.1 (4.5)	45.1 (7.3)	55.3 (12.9)	68.1 (20.1)	74.3 (23.5)	71.6 (22.0)	64.8 (18.2)	51.3 (10.7)	39.0 (3.9)	31.0 (−0.6)	50.4 (10.2)
Daily mean °F (°C)	20.9 (−6.2)	21.4 (−5.9)	27.7 (−2.4)	32.5 (0.3)	41.6 (5.3)	52.3 (11.3)	58.6 (14.8)	56.4 (13.6)	49.6 (9.8)	38.4 (3.6)	28.3 (−2.1)	20.9 (−6.2)	37.4 (3.0)
Mean daily minimum °F (°C)	10.8 (−11.8)	10.0 (−12.2)	15.3 (−9.3)	20.0 (−6.7)	28.0 (−2.2)	36.4 (2.4)	42.8 (6.0)	41.1 (5.1)	34.3 (1.3)	25.5 (−3.6)	17.7 (−7.9)	10.8 (−11.8)	24.4 (−4.2)
Mean minimum °F (°C)	−9.0 (−22.8)	−10.0 (−23.3)	−3.6 (−19.8)	3.7 (−15.7)	15.3 (−9.3)	27.9 (−2.3)	35.8 (2.1)	33.2 (0.7)	22.5 (−5.3)	9.1 (−12.7)	−2.2 (−19.0)	−9.9 (−23.3)	−16.8 (−27.1)
Record low °F (°C)	−25 (−32)	−33 (−36)	−19 (−28)	−12 (−24)	−1 (−18)	22 (−6)	20 (−7)	26 (−3)	13 (−11)	−13 (−25)	−23 (−31)	−28 (−33)	−33 (−36)
Average precipitation inches (mm)	1.23 (31)	1.52 (39)	2.26 (57)	2.61 (66)	2.28 (58)	1.36 (35)	1.95 (50)	1.74 (44)	1.57 (40)	1.36 (35)	1.34 (34)	1.35 (34)	20.57 (523)
Average snowfall inches (cm)	16.2 (41)	20.0 (51)	28.5 (72)	35.7 (91)	14.8 (38)	1.6 (4.1)	0.0 (0.0)	0.0 (0.0)	2.5 (6.4)	13.6 (35)	21.4 (54)	19.5 (50)	173.8 (442.5)
Average extreme snow depth inches (cm)	18.3 (46)	23.1 (59)	29.3 (74)	28.6 (73)	16.9 (43)	1.2 (3.0)	0.0 (0.0)	0.0 (0.0)	1.3 (3.3)	6.8 (17)	8.9 (23)	14.2 (36)	33.0 (84)
Average precipitation days (≥ 0.01 in)	9.2	10.2	9.8	10.9	10.3	9.6	13.2	14.3	9.4	7.6	8.6	9.0	122.1
Average snowy days (≥ 0.1 in)	9.2	10.1	9.6	10.4	5.3	0.7	0.0	0.0	0.9	5.4	8.4	9.1	69.1
Source 1: NOAA
Source 2: National Weather Service

== See also ==
- List of national forests of the United States
