= Troublesome Creek (Towaliga River tributary) =

Stream in Georgia, U.S.

Coordinates: 33°18′45.41″N 84°10′33.71″W

Troublesome Creek is a stream in the U.S. state of Georgia. It is a tributary to the Towaliga River.

Troublesome Creek is a name indicative of rugged terrain.
