= Troublesome Creek (Long Creek tributary) =

Stream in Georgia, U.S.

Coordinates: 33°51′18.43″N 83°2′53.54″W

Troublesome Creek is a stream in the U.S. state of Georgia. It is a tributary to Long Creek.

Troublesome Creek was named for the treacherous terrain through which it flows.
