= Huston Park Wilderness =

Nature preserve in Wyoming United States

- IUCN category Ib (wilderness area)
- Location within Wyoming Location within the United States
- Location: Carbon County, Wyoming, USA
- Nearest city: Laramie, WY
- Coordinates: 41°06′N 106°56′W
- Area: 30,588 acres (123.79 km^{2})
- Established: 1984
- Governing body: U.S. Forest Service

The Huston Park Wilderness is located in south central Wyoming in the United States. Entirely within Medicine Bow National Forest, the wilderness was designated in 1984 to preserve the northernmost section of the central Rocky Mountains, an area of high mountain peaks and coniferous forest.

U.S. Wilderness Areas do not allow motorized or mechanized vehicles, including bicycles. Although camping and fishing are allowed with proper permit, no roads or buildings are constructed and there is also no logging or mining, in compliance with the 1964 Wilderness Act. Wilderness areas within National Forests and Bureau of Land Management areas also allow hunting in season.

== See also ==
- List of U.S. Wilderness Areas
