= Encampment River Wilderness =

Protected area in Wyoming, United States

- IUCN category Ib (wilderness area)
- Location within Wyoming Location within the United States
- Location: Carbon County, Wyoming, USA
- Nearest city: Laramie, WY
- Coordinates: 41°05′N 106°44′W
- Area: 10,124 acres (40.97 km^{2})
- Established: 1984
- Governing body: U.S. Forest Service

The Encampment River Wilderness is a designated wilderness area located in south central Wyoming in the United States. Entirely within Medicine Bow National Forest, the wilderness was designated to increase protection of the Encampment River and the canyon through which it flows.

U.S. Wilderness Areas do not allow motorized or mechanized vehicles, including bicycles. Although camping and fishing are allowed with a proper permit, no roads or buildings are constructed and there is also no logging or mining, in compliance with the 1964 Wilderness Act. Wilderness areas within National Forests and Bureau of Land Management areas also allow hunting in season.

== See also ==
- List of U.S. Wilderness Areas
