= Savage Run Wilderness =

Wilderness area in Wyoming, United States

- IUCN category Ib (wilderness area)
- Location within Wyoming Location within the United States
- Location: Carbon / Albany counties, Wyoming, USA
- Nearest city: Laramie, WY
- Coordinates: 41°11′N 106°22′W
- Area: 14,927 acres (60.41 km^{2})
- Established: 1978
- Governing body: U.S. Forest Service

The Savage Run Wilderness is located in south central Wyoming in the United States. Entirely within Medicine Bow National Forest, the wilderness was designated in 1978 in an effort to protect vital rangeland for a large elk population.

== Restrictions ==
U.S. Wilderness Areas do not allow motorized or mechanized vehicles, including bicycles. Although camping and fishing are allowed with proper permit, no roads or buildings are constructed and there is also no logging or mining, in compliance with the 1964 Wilderness Act. Wilderness areas within National Forests and Bureau of Land Management areas also allow hunting in season.

== See also ==
- List of U.S. Wilderness Areas
