= Troublesome Creek (Colorado River tributary) =

Stream in Colorado, U.S.

Coordinates: 40°03′22″N 106°18′17″W

Troublesome Creek is a stream in the U.S. state of Colorado. It is a tributary of the Colorado River.

Troublesome Creek was named for the fact soldiers had trouble crossing it.

== See also ==
- List of rivers of Colorado
