= Top of the Rockies National Scenic Byway =

Colorado Scenic and Historic Byway

Coordinates: 39.2483°N 106.2917°W

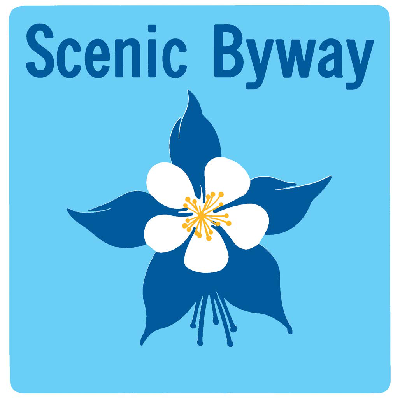
Top of the Rockies National Scenic Byway

Route information
- Maintained by CDOT
- Length: 115 mi (185 km)
- Existed: 1993–present

Major junctions
- South end: SH 82 in Aspen or SH 82 / US 24 2 miles (3 km) north of Granite
- North end: I-70 exit 171 2 miles (3 km) north of Minturn or I-70 exit 195 at Copper Mountain

Location
- Country: United States
- State: Colorado
- Counties: Eagle, Lake, Pitkin, Summit

Highway system
- Scenic Byways; National; National Forest; BLM; NPS; Colorado State Highway System; Interstate; US; State; Scenic

The Top of the Rockies National Scenic Byway is a National Scenic Byway and Colorado Scenic and Historic Byway located in the high Rocky Mountains of Eagle, Lake, Pitkin, Summit counties, Colorado, United States. The 115-mile (185 km) byway showcases the two highest peaks of the Rocky Mountains: Mount Elbert at elevation 14,440 feet (4,401.2 m) and Mount Massive at elevation 14,428 feet (4,398 m). The byway connects with the Collegiate Peaks Scenic Byway at the junction of Colorado State Highway 82 and U.S. Highway 24.

The byway has two northern extensions. The northwestern extension extends from the historic mining town of Leadville over Tennessee Pass to Interstate 70 near Minturn. The northeastern extension extends from Leadville over Fremont Pass to I-70 at Copper Mountain. The two extensions can be driven together as a tour from I-70 to Leadville and back to I-70.

The byway crosses the Continental Divide at Independence Pass at 12,095 feet (3,687 m) elevation, Fremont Pass at 11,318 feet (3,450 m) elevation, and Tennessee Pass at 10,424 feet (3,177 m) elevation. Independence Pass is closed from October to May. The gold mining ghost town of Independence is a historic townsite 2.2 miles (4 km) west of Independence Pass. The Leadville Historic District is a National Historic Landmark. History Colorado operates the Healy House Museum and Dexter Cabin in Leadville. The City of Leadville is the highest incorporated city in North America with a downtown elevation of 10,152 feet (3,094 m).

== Route description ==
The byway starts in Aspen, traveling on SH 82 east over Independence Pass and near the Twin Lakes to just north of the town of Granite. The route then continues north on US 24 through Leadville to Interstate 70 (I-70). A spur of the byway continues along the entire length of SH 91 from Leadville to Copper Mountain, through Fremont Pass.

== Major intersections ==
=== Main route ===
County	Location	mi	km	Destinations	Notes
Pitkin	Aspen	0.0	0.0	SH 82 west	
Lake				US 24 south	Byway continues on US 24 north
Lake	Leadville			SH 91 north	
Eagle	Minturn			I-70 / US 6 – Denver, Grand Junction	Western terminus of US 24
1.000 mi = 1.609 km; 1.000 km = 0.621 mi

=== Fremont Pass route ===
County	Location	mi	km	Destinations	Notes
Lake		0.000	0.000	US 24	
Summit		22.605	36.379	I-70	Interchange
1.000 mi = 1.609 km; 1.000 km = 0.621 mi

== Gallery ==
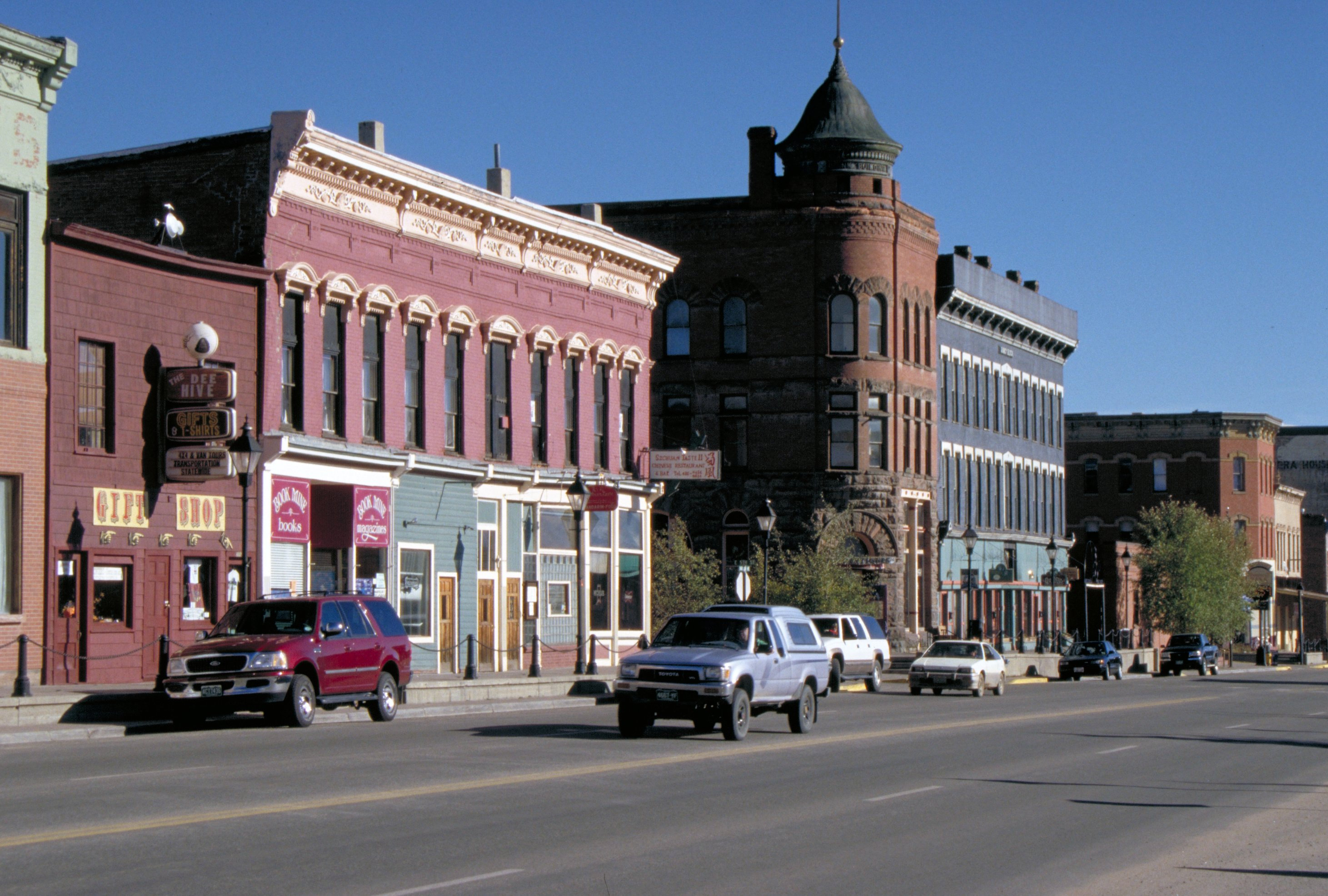
Leadville Historic District

== See also ==
- History Colorado
