= Leadville Historic District =

Historic district in Colorado, United States

- U.S. National Register of Historic Places
- U.S. National Historic Landmark District
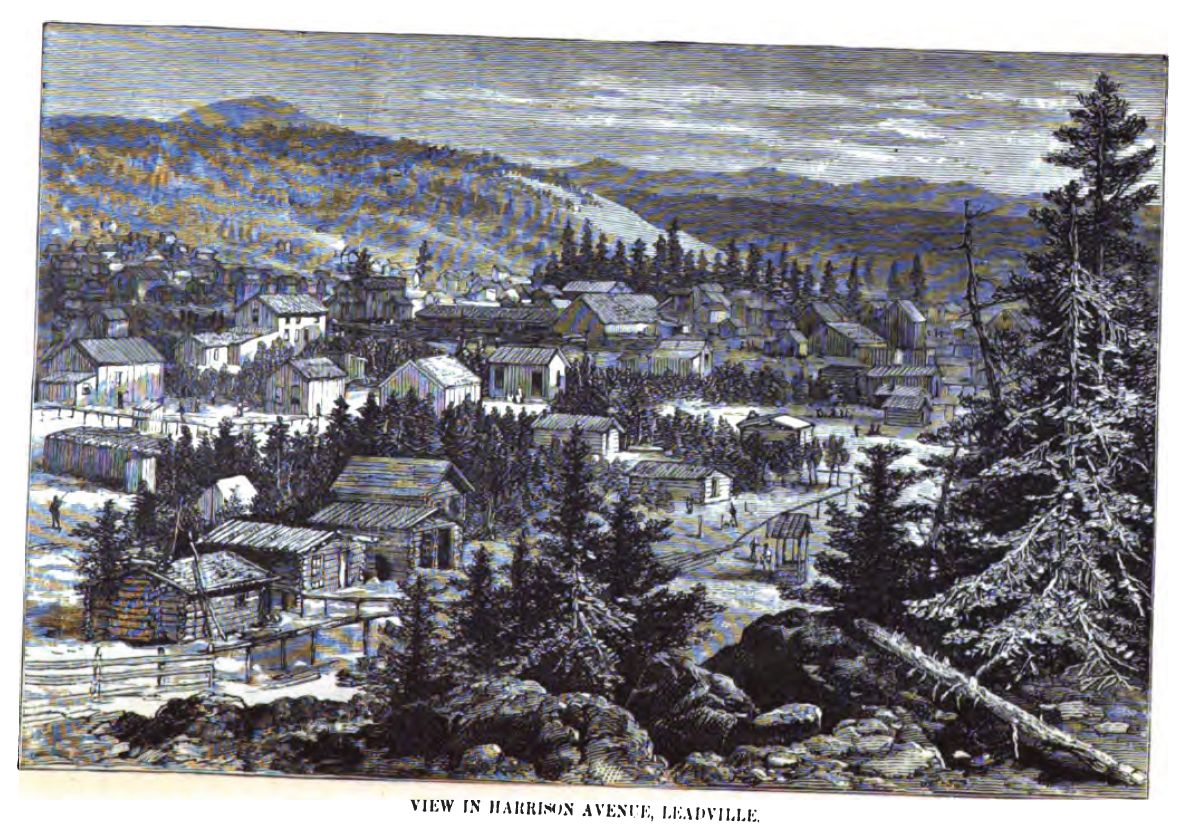
- Leadville circa 1880

- Location within Colorado Location within the United States
- Location: Leadville, Colorado
- Coordinates: 39°14′39″N 106°13′42″W
- Built: 1860
- Architect: H. A. W. Tabor
- Architectural style: Late Victorian
- NRHP reference No.: 66000248

Significant dates
- Added to NRHP: October 15, 1966
- Designated NHLD: July 4, 1961

The Leadville Historic District is in the mining town of Leadville, Colorado. The National Historic Landmark District includes 67 mines in the mining district east of the city up to the 12,000 foot (3658 m) level, and a defined portion of the village area. It was designated in 1961. Then, when the National Register of Historic Places (NRHP) program was started in 1966, Leadville's National Historic District was included in its first day's listings, along with all other existing National Historic Landmarks. The NRHP district was later expanded, adding a number of structures along the Harrison Avenue corridor, and making them eligible for historic preservation grants and tax subsidies, too.

== Buildings ==
Principal historic buildings in the district are: Tabor Grand Hotel, St. George's Church, Temple Israel, Annunciation Church, Tabor Opera House, City Hall, Healy House, Dexter Cabin, Engelbach House, and Tabor House, as well as mining structures and homes of miners, merchants, and businesspeople. Structures built after 1917 are considered non-contributing.

== Boot Hill Cemetery ==
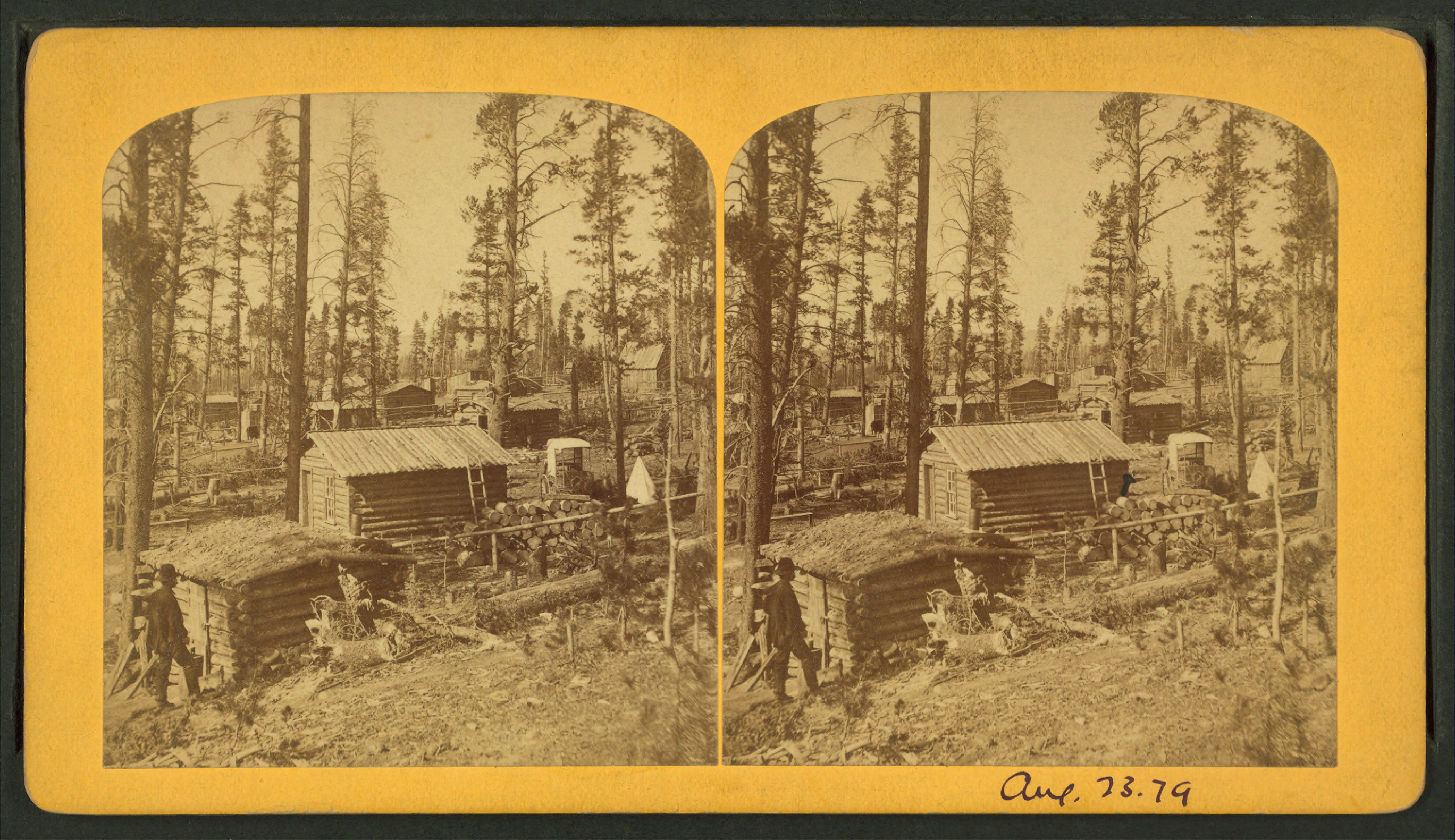
Stereoscopic view of Leadville – circa - April 23, 1879

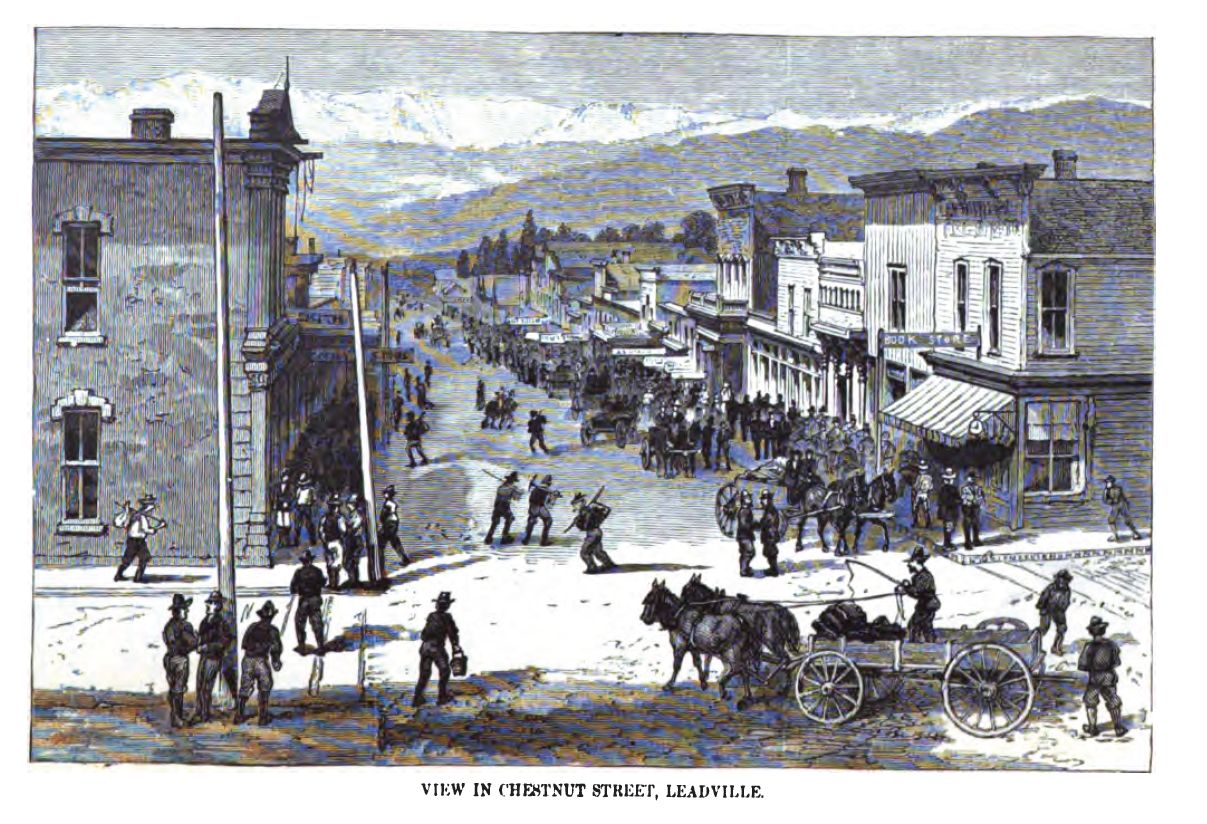
Chesnut Street, Leadville 1880

Leadville was the site of a Boot Hill Cemetery, which is perhaps the "most documented" of those in the Old West.

According to an eyewitness:

"At the foot of Chestnut street, a little distance from the Leadville Smeltering Company's works, in an acre plot of ground unfenced, and with the carbonate-like earth thrown up into little heaps. On a closer inspection, the stranger will see that many of these carbonate mounds are marked by pieces of boards, slabs and sticks. Two or three have marble slabs and as many more are marked by pine [wood] boards painted in imitation of marble. ... [It was a] barren red clay-colored plot [with] no flowery lawns, spouting fountains, shady nooks, grassy plats, nor artistically carved marble. ... A worse or less inviting spot for the repose of the dead could not have been found within the environs of our city. Here all the vast transportation of a great mining camp passes in daily bustle and confusionis, and the sleep of our dead forever disturbed by the oaths and the 'black snake' of the irreverent freighter [train]."

== Historic structures in Leadville ==
The National Register of Historic Places is the official list of the Nation's historic places worthy of preservation. Authorized by the National Historic Preservation Act of 1966, the National Park Service's National Register of Historic Places is part of a national program to coordinate and support public and private efforts to identify, evaluate, and protect America's historic and archeological resources.

Representative buildings
Name	Architectural Style	Comments
Tabor Grand Hotel Tabor Grand Hotel, 701 Harrison Avenue ~ 1886	Second Empire	This four story brick building was designed by architect George King, and built by Horace Tabor. The hotel has had many names including the Maxwell, the Kitchen, and the Vendome. The building was renovated and re-opened in 1992 with shops on the lower floor and apartments on the upper floors
Temple Israel Temple Israel, 201 West Fourth Street ~ 1884	Carpenter Gothic	This building is a rare example of a frontier synagogue. It served an interesting group of Jewish pioneers, typically downtown merchants such as David May, who founded the May Company department store. It presently functions as a museum dedicated to the pioneer Jews of Leadville.
Tabor Opera House Tabor Opera House (2007), 308 Harrison Avenue ~ 1879	Italianate	Built by Horace Tabor, it was one of the most costly and substantially-built structures in Colorado history. The construction materials were not available in Leadville, so Tabor ordered that they be brought up by wagons. Its solid brick walls stand 16 inches thick.
St. George's Church St. George's Church, 4th and Pine ~ 1880	Carpenter Gothic	The Episcopal church was built as a small replica of St. George's Church in New York City. The architectural features include hand-hewn beams and gothic arches of native timber, plaster walls, and unusual "tinted glass" windows. The windows were created using the technique of painting clear glass and glazing in a furnace
Annunciation Church Annunciation Roman Catholic Church, 609 Poplar Street ~ 1880	Gothic Revival	The Annunciation Roman Catholic Church's great bell, the "St. Mary", weighs 3,026 pounds and is 11,000 feet above sea level. The church hosted the 1886 wedding of the woman who became known as "the unsinkable Molly Brown."
City Hall Leadville City Hall, N.E. Corner 8th and Harrison Avenue ~ 1905	Neoclassical	Built as a federal building, it was used as a U.S. Post Office until 1973. There is a plaque on the front of the building which denotes fallen lawmen and an antique Leadville popcorn wagon is on display in the lobby.
Healy House The Healy House, 912 Harrison Avenue ~ 1878 Healy House	Vernacular Italianate	Originally a two-story structure, the Healy House was built in 1878 by August R. Meyer, a mining engineer from St. Louis who established the first ore sampling works in Leadville. Sold in 1881, the house eventually became the property of Daniel Healy, who leased it as a boardinghouse from 1897 to 1902. In 1898 a third story was added to accommodate more boarders, most of them schoolteachers
Tabor Home Tabor Home, 116 East 5th Street ~ 1877	Carpenter Gothic	Built by Augusta and Horace Tabor. Tabor moved to the Windsor Hotel in 1881 to be near to his mistress, "Baby Doe". The Tabor triangle grew into a national scandal and finally ended in divorce and Tabor's marriage to Baby Doe.
Dexter Cabin Dexter Cabin, 912 Harrison Avenue ~ 1878	log cabin	This cabin was moved to this site, and is typical of those occupied by miners in Leadville's early years. However, when it was built by James Dexter, he was already a wealthy man. He was a sought-after host, and his cabin, although small, allowed Dexter the freedom to entertain informally. He quickly became known as having the "stiffest and most exclusive private poker club" in Leadville. Now serves as part of the Healy House Museum
Englebach House Englebach House, 815 Harrison Avenue ~ 1890s	Eastlake movement, Queen Anne	Amongst the most distinctive houses in Leadville
Breene Block Breene Block, 326 Harrison Avenue ~ 1887	19th century commercial	The building was named for Lt. Governor and State Treasurer of Colorado, Peter W. Breene, who provided the funding. Initially the first floor was occupied by Adolph Hirsch's liquor store which perhaps did the largest volume of business in Western Colorado
Western Hardware Building Western Hardware, S.W. Corner Harrison Ave. and 5th St. ~ 1881	19th century commercial	Initially opened as the Manville and McCarthy Hardware, it operated as a hardware store for over 100 years. It is an excellent example of 19th century commercial architecture. Many of the original store fixtures including a long counter and wall of drawers are on display.
American National Bank American National Bank, 460 Harrison Avenue ~ 1892	Richardsonian Romanesque	The building's first occupant was the American National Bank. It has a 17-foot tower of red sandstone topped with a bell shaped metal painted dome.
Iron Building Iron Building, 518 Harrison Avenue ~ 1893	19th century commercial	On the corner pediment is the name Fearnley. It was built amidst the collapse of the silver market. It is thought the name "Iron Building" either comes from the use of iron on the building or from the fact that the humble iron ore found in the Leadville mining district might be a saving grace after the fall of silver
The Old Church The Old Church, N.W. corner of 8th and Harrison Avenue ~ 1889	Queen Anne, Carpenter Gothic	Presbyterian Church, called "The Old Church". Open Gothic-styled bell tower, the church has been a landmark on Harrison Avenue since its dedication ceremonies on December 22 of 1889. The decorative glass sections of the windows are of various types, the most common being hand-painted glass of Persian technique
The Silver Dollar Saloon Silver Dollar Saloon, 315 Harrison Avenue ~ 1883	Originally Italianate and Eastlake	Opening in 1883 in the Clipper Building, it was originally the Board of Trade Saloon. It has been the Silver Dollar since 1935. It retains the original bar and tile flooring.
Cornella Building Cornella Building, S.W. corner of Pine and 6th St. ~ 1889	19th century commercial	
Jesse McDonald Mansion Jesse McDonald House, 128 W. 8th St. ~ circa unknown	Queen Anne	Mansion of Jesse Fuller McDonald, 1904 Governor of Colorado

== See also ==
- National Register of Historic Places listings in Lake County, Colorado
