= Mineral Belt National Recreation Trail =

National Recreation Trail in Colorado

Coordinates: 39°14′53″N 106°18′12″W

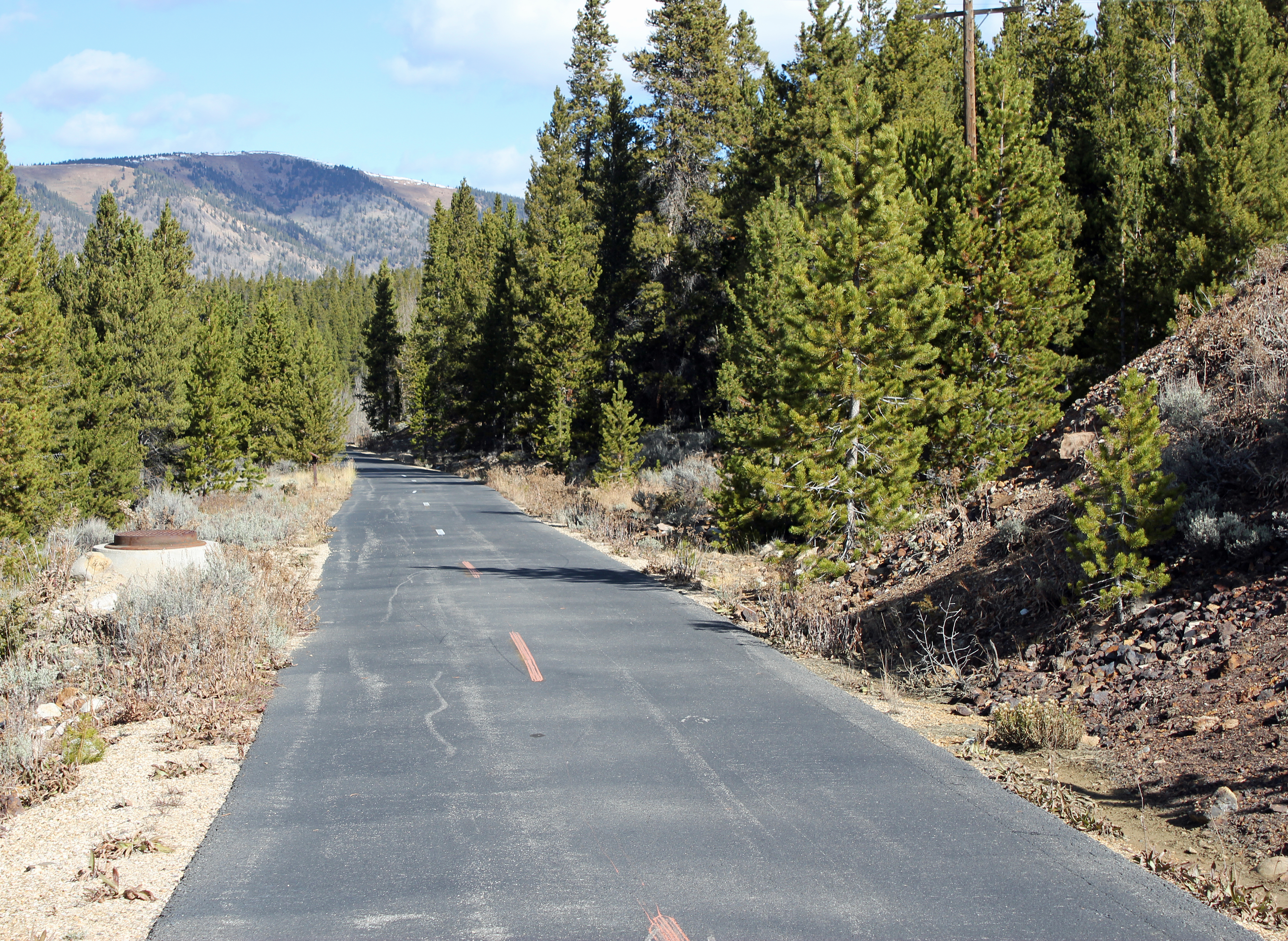
The trail as it passes near the Matchless Mine, north of Leadville

The Mineral Belt National Recreation Trail is an 11.6 mile all-season biking/walking trail that loops around Leadville, Colorado, and through its historic mining district. The trail's setting is quintessentially Colorado Rocky Mountain landscape. Groves of aspen, conifer forests, wildflower meadows, and open vista sage parks are interspersed with once-booming mine sites. Ever-present views of the Sawatch and Mosquito mountain ranges provide perspective and a sense of permanence to the area. Several signs along the way provide historical snippets about Leadville's colorful past. The trail is designed for bicycles, longboards, walkers, wheelchairs, strollers and in-line skaters. When the snow falls, snowcats groom the trail to provide access to Nordic skiers, snowshoers and winter-bikers.

About six miles of this trail meanders through the historic Leadville Mining District. In part the trail follows old mining-camp railbeds. "What makes this trail unique is that it goes through one of the greatest mining districts in the world," says Lake County, Colorado Assessor Howard A. Tritz, an original member of the group which spearheaded trail development. "It has some of the best scenery anywhere, and it's accessible and available to everyone, visitors and locals alike, regardless of age or ability."

== Sources and external links ==
- Mineral Belt Trail's Website
- The Mineral Belt Trail, Leadville, Colorado
