= Leadville, Colorado =

City in Colorado, United States

- Statutory city
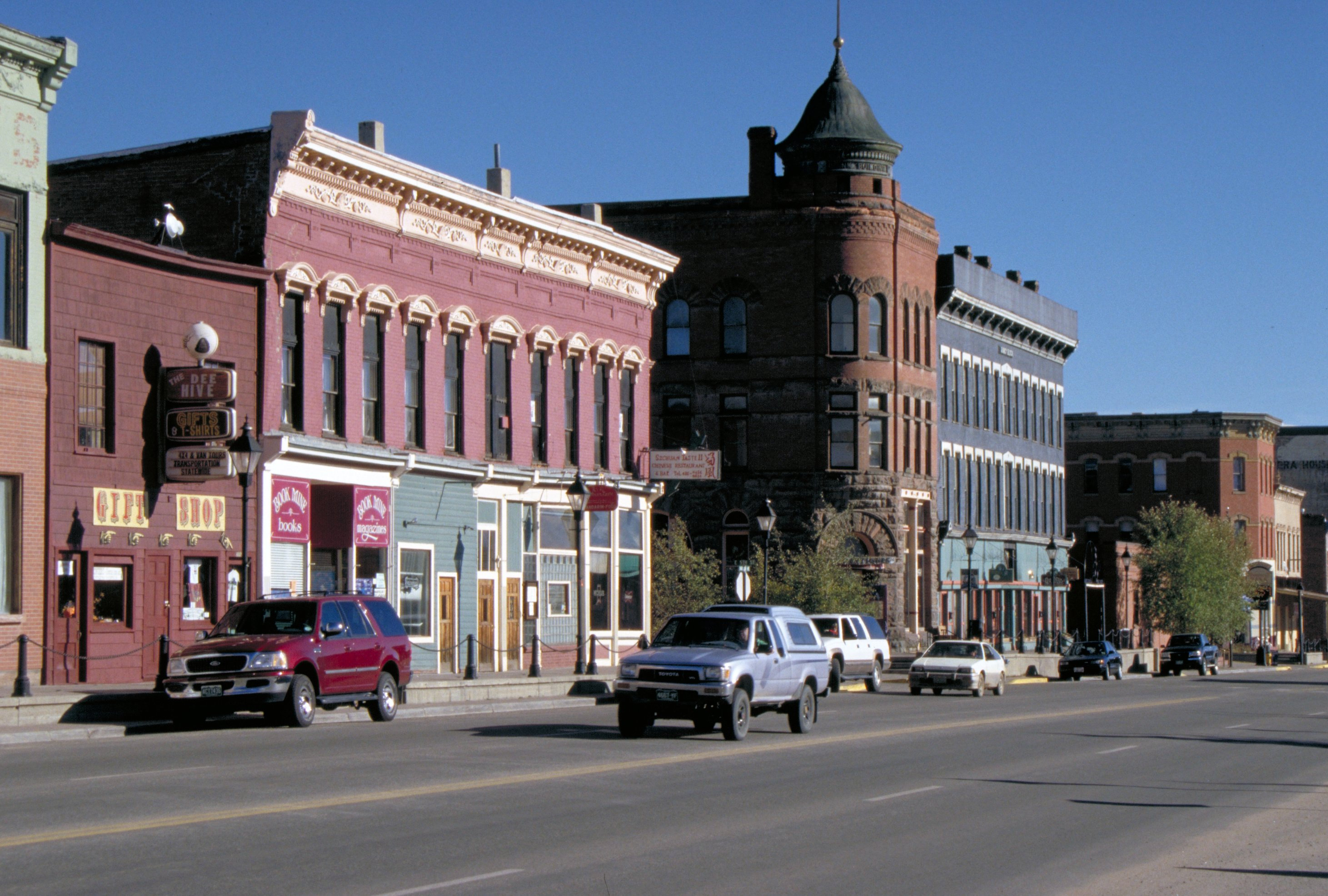
- Downtown Leadville
- Nicknames: The Two-Mile-High City, Cloud City
- Location of the City of Leadville in Lake County, Colorado
- Coordinates: 39°15′02″N 106°17′28″W
- Country: United States
- State: Colorado
- County: Lake
- Founded: 1877
- Incorporated: February 18, 1878

Government
  - Type: Statutory city

Area
  - Total: 1.17 sq mi (3.04 km^{2})
  - Land: 1.17 sq mi (3.04 km^{2})
  - Water: 0 sq mi (0.00 km^{2})
- Elevation: 10,154 ft (3,095 m)

Population (2020)
  - Total: 2,633
  - Density: 2,240/sq mi (866/km^{2})
- Time zone: UTC−7 (Mountain (MST))
  - Summer (DST): UTC−6 (MDT)
- ZIP Codes: 80429 (PO Box), 80461
- Area code: 719
- FIPS code: 08-44320
- GNIS feature ID: 2411641
- Website: www.leadville-co.gov
- Highest elevation city in the United States

Leadville (/ˈlɛdvɪl/ LED-vil) is a statutory city that is the county seat of, the most populous community in, and the only incorporated municipality in Lake County, Colorado, United States. The city population was 2,633 at the 2020 United States census. It is situated at an elevation of 10,119 feet (3,084 m). Leadville is the highest incorporated city in the United States and is surrounded by the two tallest peaks in the state, Mount Elbert and Mount Massive.

Leadville is a former silver mining town that lies among the headwaters of the Arkansas River within the Rocky Mountains. The Leadville Historic District, designated a National Historic Landmark in 1961, contains many historic structures and sites of Leadville's mining era. In the late 19th century, Leadville was the second most populous city in Colorado, after Denver.

== History ==
=== Settlement ===
The Leadville area was first settled in 1859 when placer gold was discovered by A. G. Kelley in California Gulch, and by Abe Lee in April (25/26) 1860, during the Pikes Peak Gold Rush. Prospectors panned for gold in the stream that ran through California Gulch in what became the town of Oro City (oro is the Spanish word for gold). Horace Tabor, who became known as the "Leadville Silver King", and his wife Augusta were among the first prospectors to arrive in Oro City. Horace was appointed as the postmaster of Oro City on November 30, 1868. His wife made money as postmistress, banker, cook, and laundress while Tabor was a prospector.

The early miners had noted that mining for placer gold was hampered by heavy black sand in the sluice boxes, and in 1874 it was discovered that the heavy sand that impeded gold recovery was the lead mineral cerussite, which has a high silver content. Prospectors traced the cerussite to its source, present day Leadville, and by 1876 had discovered several silver-lead lode deposits. By this time, most of the placer gold had been extracted from the gulch; attention shifted to nearby Leadville, and Oro City became a ghost town.

=== Founding of Leadville ===
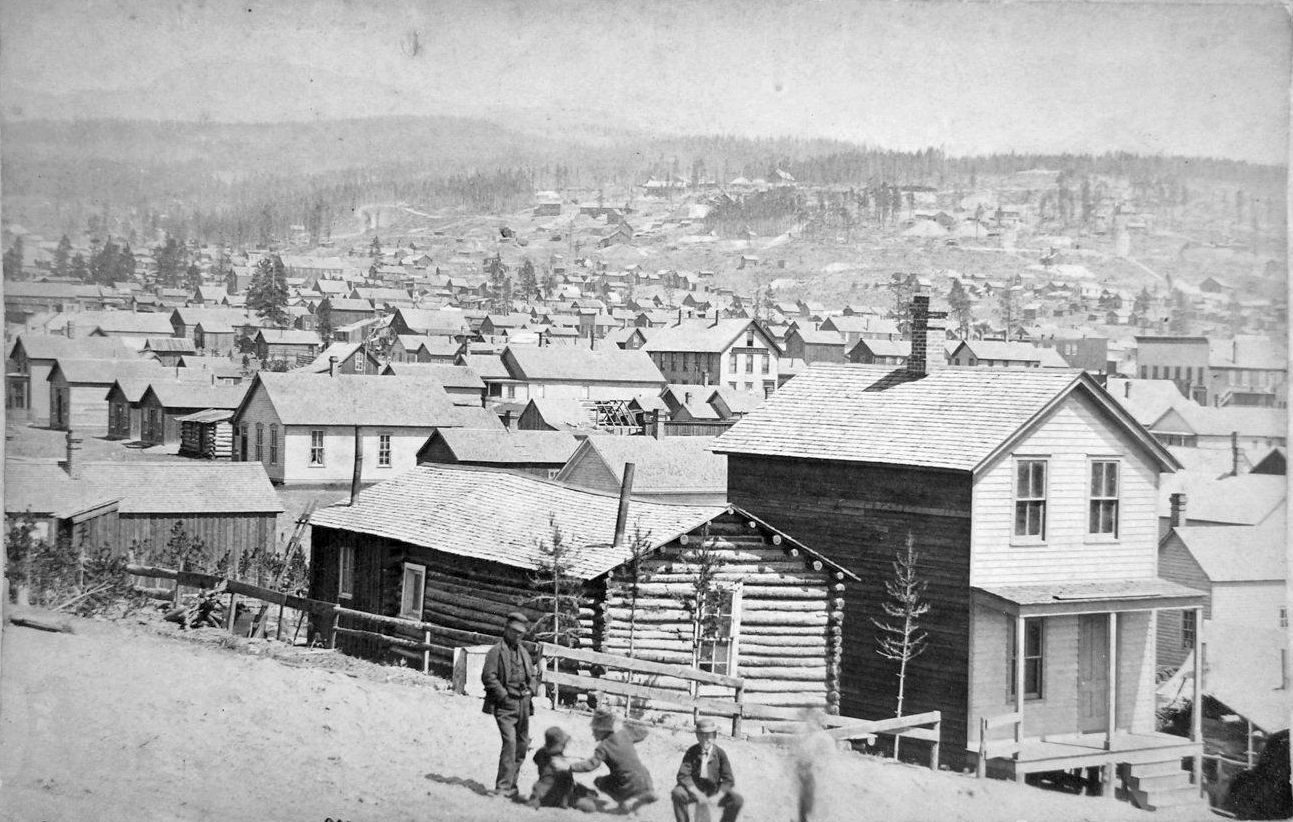
Leadville, circa 1880, with the Eighth Avenue Motel in center of photo, and mining works visible on hill beyond Leadville.

Leadville was founded in 1877 by mine owners Horace Tabor and August Meyer at the start of the Colorado Silver Boom. Tabor's house was also built in 1877, at 116 E. 5th Street. The town was built on desolate flat land below the tree line. The first miners lived in a rough tented camp near the silver deposits in California Gulch. Initially, the settlement was called "Slabtown", but when the residents petitioned for a post office, the name "Leadville" was chosen. By 1880, Tabor and Meyer's new town had gas lighting, water mains, 28 miles (45 km) of streets, 5 churches, 3 hospitals, 6 banks, and a school for 1,100 students. Many business buildings were constructed with bricks hauled in by wagons.

In early 1878, Meyer, along with Leadville's pioneer smelter entrepreneur, Edwin Harrison, after whom the famed Harrison Avenue is named, and Tabor established a post office in Leadville, with George L. Henderson designated as postmaster on July 16, 1877. The post office and the telegraph office both prospered, with Tabor serving as postmaster from February 19 to December 13, 1878. It was said that the Leadville post office was the busiest one between St. Louis and San Francisco. In 1878, the town's first hospital, St. Vincent's, was opened.

The town's first newspaper was The Reveille, a Republican weekly, which was founded in 1878. Three months later, a competing Democratic weekly, The Eclipse, emerged. The Chronicle was the town's first daily and first newspaper in America to employ a full-time female reporter. Like the Rocky Mountain News, The Chronicle took the lead in outing criminals and thieves, in an attempt to clean up the town's shady business culture. Despite violent threats, the Chronicle survived without major incident.

William Nye opened the first saloon in 1877, and it was followed by many others. The same year the Coliseum Novelty was the first theater to open. It offered sleeping rooms upstairs for a nightly rate and provided a variety of entertainments: dancing girls, dogfights, cockfighting, wrestling and boxing matches, and rooms for gambling. In June 1881, it burned to the ground. Ben Wood, who arrived in Leadville in 1878, opened the first legitimate theater, Wood's Opera House, with a thousand seats. It was a first-class theater, where gentlemen removed their hats and did not smoke or drink in the presence of a lady. Less than a year later, Wood opened the Windsor Hotel. His opera house was regarded as the largest and best theater constructed in the West, an honor it held until the opening of the Tabor Opera House. Horace Tabor's Opera House was the costliest structure in Colorado at the time. Building materials were brought by wagons from Denver. The massive three-story opera house, constructed of stone, brick, and iron, opened on November 20, 1879. Tabor, originally from Vermont, became the town's first mayor. After striking it rich, he had an estimated net worth of 10 million dollars and was known for his extravagant lifestyle. In February 1879 the Lake County seat was moved to Leadville, where it has remained ever since. In 1879, An impressive courthouse was built on the west side of Harrison Avenue, joined by a new post office that same year. Telephone service was introduced by Western Union on May 15, 1879, and gas lighting downtown was installed on November 18 that same year. Billings and Eilers Smelter installed a generator and lights for the town on May 13, 1881. On May 19, 1882, a large fire broke out at the corner of Harrison Avenue and East Chestnut.

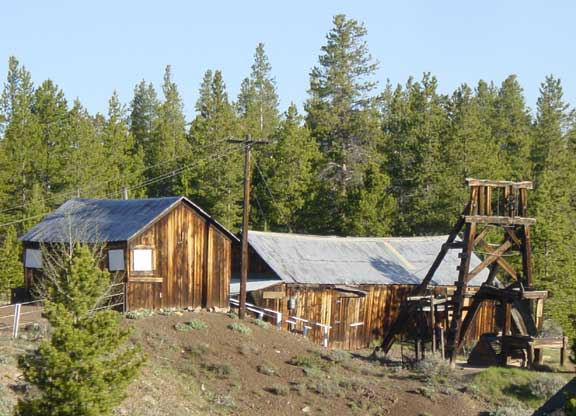
Matchless mine and Baby Doe Tabor cabin

Horace Tabor divorced his wife of 25 years and married Baby Doe McCourt on September 30, 1882, who was half his age. Tabor was by then a US senator, and the divorce and marriage caused a scandal in Colorado and beyond. For several years, the couple lived a lavish lifestyle in a Denver mansion, but Tabor, one of the wealthiest men in Colorado, lost his fortune when the repeal of the Sherman Silver Purchase Act caused the Panic of 1893. He died on April 10, 1899, of appendicitis, destitute but remained convinced that the price of silver would rebound. According to legend, he told Baby Doe to "hold on the Matchless mine ... it will make millions again when silver comes back." She returned to Leadville with her daughters, Silver Dollar and Lily, where she spent the rest of her life believing Tabor's prediction. At one time the "best dressed woman in the West", she lived in a cabin at the Matchless Mine for the last three decades of her life. On March 7, 1935, after a snowstorm, she was found frozen in her cabin, aged about 81 years.

=== Mining and smelting ===
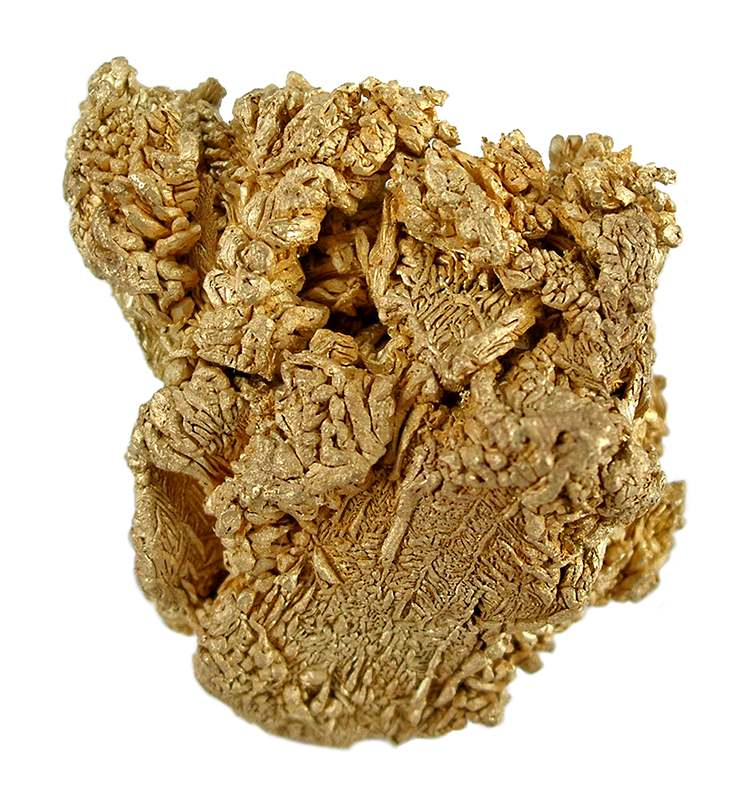
Crystalline gold specimen from the Little Johnny Mine, Breece Hill, Leadville mining district

Mining in the Leadville area began in 1859 when prospectors discovered gold at the mouth of California Gulch. By 1872, placer mining in California Gulch yielded more than $2,500,000, roughly equivalent to $67,000,000 in 2025. In 1876, black sand, once considered bothersome to placer gold miners, was discovered to contain lead carbonates, leading to a rush of miners to the area and the founding of the town in 1877. By 1880, Leadville was one of the world's largest and richest silver camps, with a population of more than 15,000. Income from more than thirty mines and ten large smelting works produced gold, silver, and lead amounting to $15,000,000 annually. The Leadville strike of 1880 was the first major labor conflict in the central Colorado silver boomtown, shutting down most of the area's mining district from May 26, 1880.

According to one historian of the era, "The outpouring of the precious metal from Leadville transformed the struggling Centennial State into a veritable autocrat in the colony of states. As if by magic the rough frontier town of Denver became a metropolis; stately buildings arose on the site of shanties; crystal streams flowed through the arid plains and the desert blossomed and became fruitful. Poverty gave way to the annoyance of wealth and the fame of silver state spread throughout the world."

Swindles were not uncommon in the mining community. When the Little Pittsburg mine was exhausted of its rich ore body, its managers sold their shares while concealing the mine's actual condition from the other stockholders. "Chicken Bill" Lovell dumped a wheelbarrow load of silver-rich ore into a barren pit on his Chrysolite claim in order to sell it to Horace Tabor for a large price. Tabor had the last laugh when his miners dug a few feet farther and discovered a rich ore body. Some time later the manager of the Chrysolite mine fooled an outside mining engineer into overestimating the mine's ore reserves.

The city's fortunes declined with the repeal of the Sherman Silver Purchase Act in 1893, although afterwards there was another small gold boom. Mining companies came to rely increasingly on income from the lead and zinc. The district is credited with producing over 2.9 million troy ounces of gold, 240 million troy ounces of silver, 1 million short tons of lead, 785 thousand short tons of zinc (discovered in 1911), and 53 thousand short tons of copper.

A bitter strike by Leadville's hard rock miners in 1896–97 led to bloodshed, at least five deaths, and the burning of the Coronado Mine. In a letter to a London business contact, mine owner Eben Smith wrote, "The strikers got the worst of it in the raid on the Coronado and Emmet [mines], there were 10 or 12 killed; we do not know how many, and a great number wounded; they take care of their wounded the same as the Indians but every now and then a fellow turns up that the rats have been eating or who has gone to decay that we know must have been shot ..."

World War II caused an increase in the demand for molybdenum, used to harden steel. It was mined at the nearby Climax mine, which at one time produced 75 percent of the world's output. By 1980, the Climax Mine was the largest underground mine in the world. Taxes paid by the mine provided Leadville with good schools and libraries and provided employment for many residents. When the market dropped in 1981, Leadville's economy suffered and many people lost their jobs. With little industry other than the tourist trade, most of the former miners left, and the standard of living declined. Climax reopened in 2008 and started production in 2010. It currently is the most efficient mine producing molybdenum in Colorado and is estimated to have a production life of thirty years.

The many years of mining left behind substantial contamination of the soil and water and the Environmental Protection Agency designated some former mines Superfund sites, such as California Gulch. As of 2019, the EPA reports: "A vast majority of the cleanup at the site has been completed, so current risk of exposure is low. Pregnant women, nursing mothers and young children are still encouraged to have their blood-lead levels checked."

=== Notable historical figures ===
As the population boomed, by 1878, Leadville had the reputation as one of the most lawless towns in the West. The first city marshal was run out of town a few days after he was appointed, and his replacement was shot dead within a month by one of his deputies. Fearing the town would be lost to the lawless element, Mayor Horace Tabor sent for Mart Duggan, who was living in Denver, as a replacement. Duggan was well known at the time as a fearless gunfighter. Using strong-arm and lawless tactics, during his two stints as marshal, Duggan brought order to Leadville by 1880 when he stepped down. He was shot and killed in 1888 by an unknown assailant, most likely an enemy he had made when he was a Leadville marshal. Historian Robert Dearment writes, "Mart Duggan was a quick-shooting, hard-drinking, brawling tough Irish man, but he was exactly the kind of man a tough, hard-drinking, quick-shooting camp like Leadville needed in its earliest days. His name is all but forgotten today, but the name "Matt Dillon" is recognized around the world. Such are the vagaries of life."

Alice Ivers, better known as Poker Alice, was a card player and dealer of the Old West who learned her trade in Leadville. Born in Devonshire, her family moved to America when she was a small girl. They first settled in Virginia, where she attended an elite girls' boarding school. When she was a teenager, her family moved to Leadville when the silver boom drew hundreds of new residents to the area. At the age of twenty she married a mining engineer who, like many of the men at that time, frequented the numerous gambling halls in Leadville. Alice went along, at first just observing, but eventually she began to sit in on the games as well. After a few years of marriage her husband was killed in a mining accident and she turned to cards to support herself. Alice was attractive, dressed in the latest fashions, and was in great demand as a dealer. Eventually Alice left Leadville to travel the gambling circuit, as was common of the male gamblers of that time. She continued to dress in the latest fashions but took to smoking cigars. Well known throughout the West, gambling halls welcomed her because she was good for business. Alice said that she won more than $250,000 by gambling during her lifetime.

In the spring of 1880, Texas Jack Omohundro and his wife Giuseppina Morlacchi arrived in Leadville. Morlacchi, a famous Italian prima ballerina who had introduced the Can-can dance to the United States, performed several plays at the Grand Central Theatre, including Around the World in 80 Days and The Black Crook. Texas Jack, who had starred in The Scouts of the Prairie with Buffalo Bill Cody and Ned Buntline, and later in The Scouts of the Plains with Buffalo Bill and Wild Bill Hickok, played shows at the Chestnut Street Theatre. Texas Jack had served in the Confederate Army at age 16 and subsequently joined the Tabor Light Guard, a local militia unit. Jack died of pneumonia on June 28, 1880. His funeral was held at the Tabor Opera House, and he was buried in Evergreen Cemetery. On September 8, 1908, Texas Jack's best friend and former costar Buffalo Bill Cody visited Leadville with his Wild West Show and dedicated the permanent memorial that marks Texas Jack's grave today. The Texas Jack Association erected highway historical markers on roads in and out of Leadville.

In the summer of 1879, American author and illustrator Mary Hallock Foote arrived in Leadville. It is believed her time in Leadville inspired her writing.

In 1882, shortly after the gun fight at the O.K. Corral, Doc Holliday arrived in Leadville, where he dealt faro. On August 19, 1884, he shot ex-Leadville policeman Billy Allen, who had threatened him for failing to pay a $5 debt. Despite overwhelming evidence implicating him, a jury found Holliday not guilty of the shooting or attempted murder.

Gunfighter and professional gambler Luke Short also spent time in Leadville.

Margaret "Molly" Brown, who became known as "The Unsinkable Molly Brown", moved to Leadville in 1885, when she was 18 years old. In 1886 she married a mining engineer who was twelve years older, James Joseph Brown at the Church of Annunciation. The Brown family acquired great wealth in 1893 when Brown was instrumental in the discovery of a substantial gold ore seam at the Little Jonny Mine.

The mine was owned by his employers, the Ibex Mining Company. Margaret Brown became famous because of her survival of the 1912 sinking of the RMS Titanic, after exhorting the crew of Lifeboat No. 6 to return to look for survivors. A 1960 Broadway musical based on her life was produced, along with a 1964 film adaptation of the musical, both titled The Unsinkable Molly Brown. Her home in Denver has been preserved as the Molly Brown House Museum.

Meyer Guggenheim of the Guggenheim family started out in Leadville in mining and smelting. The family went on to possess one of the largest fortunes in the world. Family members have become known for their philanthropy in diverse areas such as modern art and aviation, including several Guggenheim Museums.

Oscar Wilde appeared in April at the Tabor Opera House during his 1882 American Aesthetic Movement lecture tour. The reviews were mixed, and the press satirized Wilde in cartoons as an English dandy decorated with sunflowers and lilies, the floral emblems of the Aesthetic Movement. A Kansas newspaper described the event:

Oscar Wilde's visit to Leadville excited a great deal of interest and curiosity. The Tabor-opera house where he lectured was packed full. It was rumored that an attempt would be made by a number of young men to ridicule him by coming to the lecture in exaggerated costume with enormous sunflowers and lilies and to introduce a number of characters in the costume of the Western "bad men". Probably, however, better counsel prevailed and no disturbance took place.

Mayor David H. Dougan invited Wilde to tour the Matchless Mine and name its new lode "The Oscar". Wilde later recounted a visit to a local saloon, "where I saw the only rational method of art criticism I have ever come across. Over the piano was printed a notice – 'Please do not shoot the pianist. He is doing his best.'"

Several other notable figures visited the Tabor Opera House, including boxer Jack Dempsey.

=== Post-mining era ===
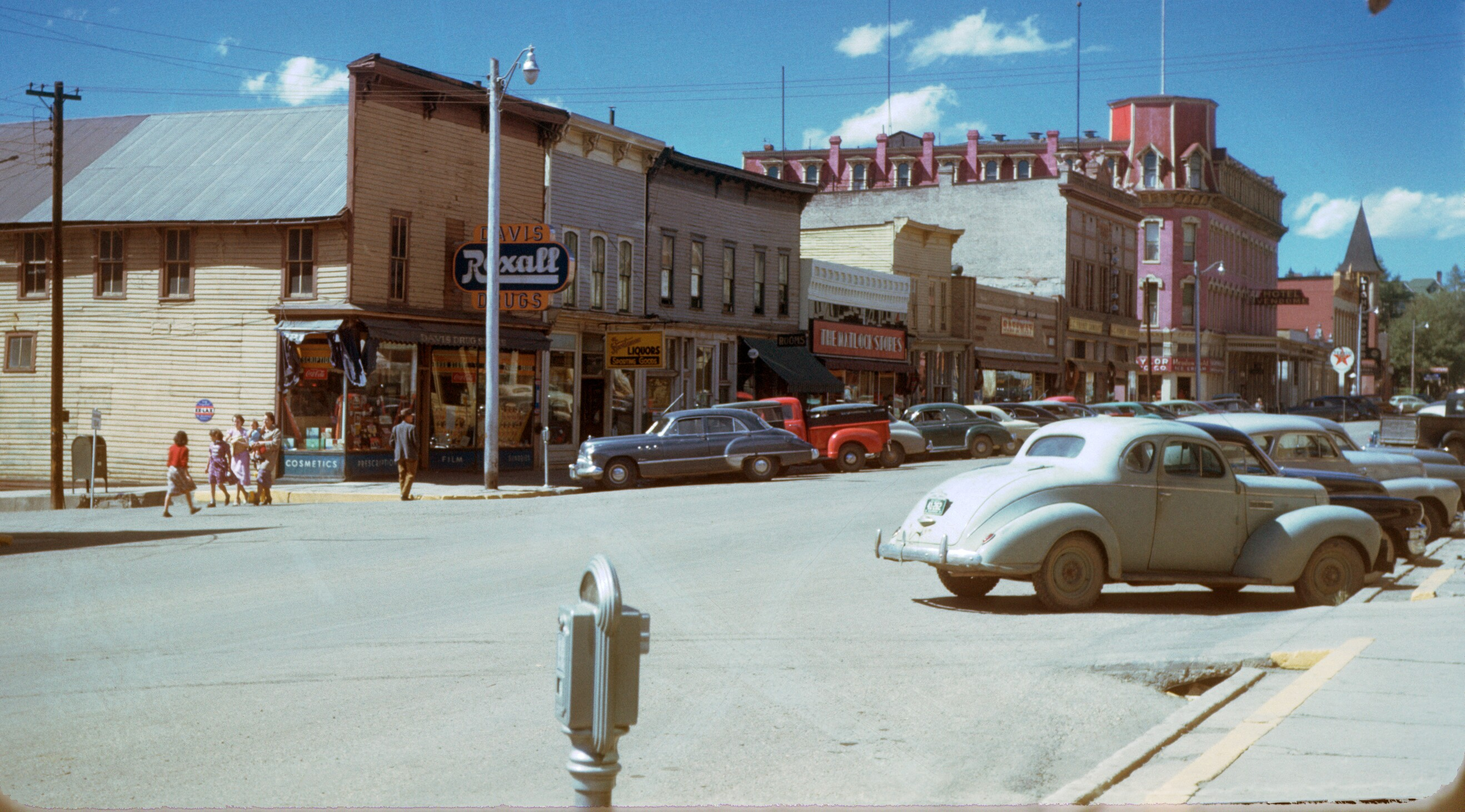
Leadville in the 1950s

The town has made major efforts to improve its economy by encouraging tourism and emphasizing its history and opportunities for outdoor recreation. The National Mining Museum and Hall of Fame opened in 1987 with a federal charter that was drawn in by Leadville offering a good deal on the former high school building.

In 1983, Ken Chlouber partnered with Merilee Maupin to founded the Leadville Trail 100 Run, a 100-mile ultramarathon through the rugged mountain terrain around the town. It succeeded, leading them to found the still-extant Leadville Race Series, which contains a variety of races. The Leadville Race Series has become a popular endurance race series, attracting hundreds of athletes to Leadville each year. Leadville is often used as a base for altitude training and hosts a number of other events for runners and mountain bicyclists.

== Geography ==
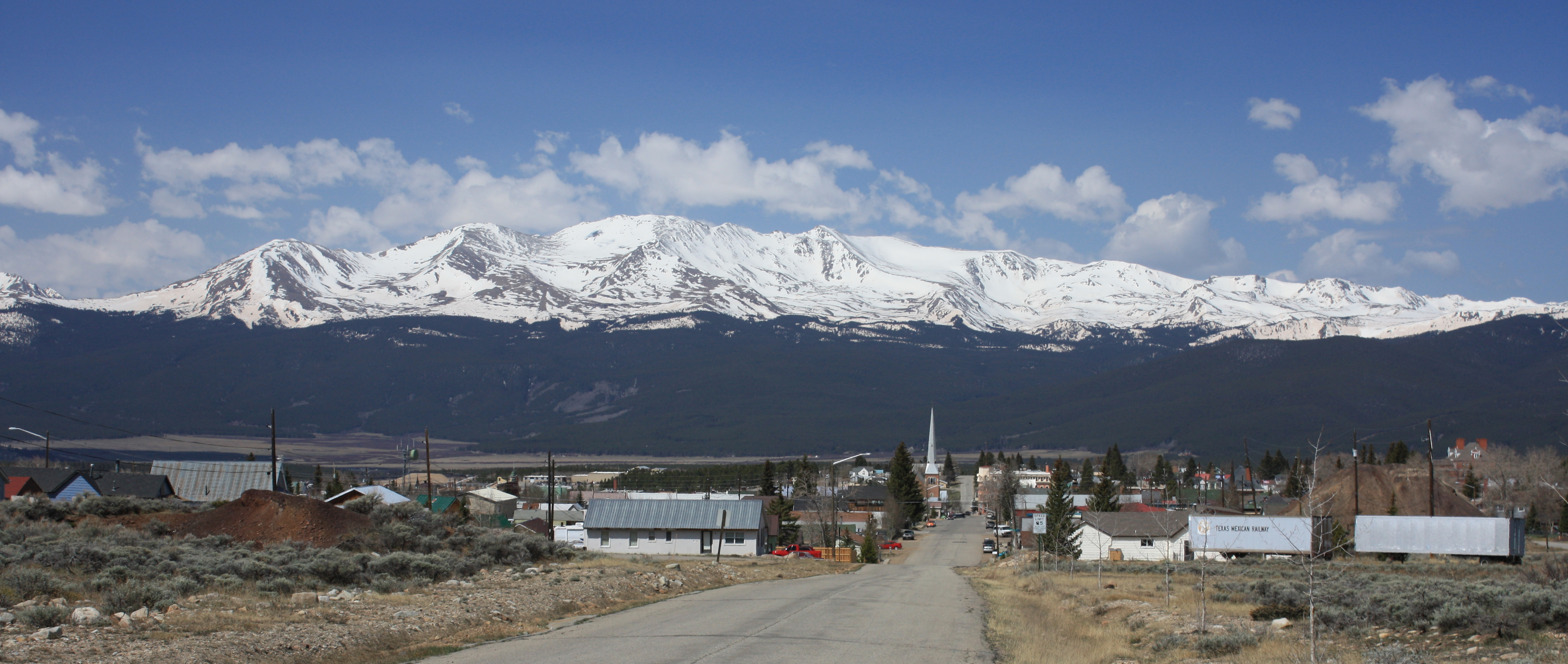
Mount Massive and Leadville from 7th Street

At an elevation of 10,158 feet (3,096 m), Leadville lies close to timberline, which in Colorado is from 11,000 to 12,000 feet (3,400 to 3,700 m). The surrounding peaks are all well above 12,000 feet, and are thus bare of trees. Leadville has the highest elevation of any city in the United States.

Leadville lies in a valley at the headwaters of the Arkansas River, situated between two mountain ranges, the Mosquito Range to the east and the Sawatch Range to the west, both of which include several nearby peaks with elevations above 14,000 feet (4,300 m), the so-called fourteeners.

According to the U.S. Census Bureau, the city of Leadville has an area of 1.1 square miles (2.9 km^{2}), all land. The lower part of California Gulch runs past the southern edge of the city, flowing west 3 miles (5 km) to the Arkansas River.

=== Climate ===
Leadville has an alpine subarctic climate (Dfc) with cold winters and mild summers, bordering on a cold semi-arid climate (Bsk). The average January temperatures are a maximum of 29.5 °F (−1.4 °C) and a minimum of 4.6 °F (−15.2 °C). The average July temperatures are a maximum of 71.0 °F (21.7 °C) and a minimum of 39.2 °F (4.0 °C). There are an average of 271.7 mornings annually with freezing temperatures, which can occur in any month of the year. The record high temperature was 86 °F (30.0 °C) on July 17, 2023. The record low temperature was −38 °F (−38.9 °C) on February 1, 1985.

Average annual precipitation is 13.52 inches (343.4 mm). The wettest calendar year was 2014 with 18.08 inches (459.2 mm) and the driest 1994 with 8.27 inches (210.1 mm). The most precipitation in one month was 4.83 inches (122.7 mm) in January 1996. The most precipitation in 24 hours was 1.70 inches (43.2 mm) on February 13, 1986. Average annual snowfall is 156.9 inches (3.99 m). The most snowfall in one year was 362.0 inches (9.19 m) in 1995. The most snowfall in one month was 77.6 inches (1.97 m) in May 1995.

Climate data for Leadville, Colorado (Lake County Airport (Colorado)), 1991–2020 normals, extremes 1976–present
Month	Jan	Feb	Mar	Apr	May	Jun	Jul	Aug	Sep	Oct	Nov	Dec	Year
Record high °F (°C)	57 (14)	54 (12)	61 (16)	65 (18)	80 (27)	82 (28)	86 (30)	84 (29)	80 (27)	72 (22)	66 (19)	56 (13)	86 (30)
Mean maximum °F (°C)	47.6 (8.7)	46.9 (8.3)	51.8 (11.0)	58.0 (14.4)	69.0 (20.6)	77.0 (25.0)	80.0 (26.7)	77.0 (25.0)	73.1 (22.8)	65.2 (18.4)	54.5 (12.5)	47.5 (8.6)	80.5 (26.9)
Mean daily maximum °F (°C)	29.5 (−1.4)	30.6 (−0.8)	36.9 (2.7)	43.0 (6.1)	54.3 (12.4)	66.2 (19.0)	71.0 (21.7)	68.1 (20.1)	61.5 (16.4)	49.9 (9.9)	37.1 (2.8)	29.4 (−1.4)	48.1 (9.0)
Daily mean °F (°C)	17.1 (−8.3)	18.1 (−7.7)	24.6 (−4.1)	31.1 (−0.5)	40.9 (4.9)	50.1 (10.1)	55.1 (12.8)	53.1 (11.7)	46.5 (8.1)	36.7 (2.6)	24.8 (−4.0)	17.1 (−8.3)	34.6 (1.4)
Mean daily minimum °F (°C)	4.6 (−15.2)	5.7 (−14.6)	12.3 (−10.9)	19.1 (−7.2)	27.4 (−2.6)	34.0 (1.1)	39.2 (4.0)	38.1 (3.4)	31.6 (−0.2)	23.6 (−4.7)	12.4 (−10.9)	4.8 (−15.1)	21.1 (−6.1)
Mean minimum °F (°C)	−14.5 (−25.8)	−14.1 (−25.6)	−8.8 (−22.7)	2.8 (−16.2)	14.7 (−9.6)	25.5 (−3.6)	31.6 (−0.2)	30.8 (−0.7)	20.7 (−6.3)	5.7 (−14.6)	−8.8 (−22.7)	−15.4 (−26.3)	−20.1 (−28.9)
Record low °F (°C)	−27 (−33)	−38 (−39)	−30 (−34)	−17 (−27)	3 (−16)	19 (−7)	21 (−6)	23 (−5)	8 (−13)	−13 (−25)	−24 (−31)	−31 (−35)	−38 (−39)
Average precipitation inches (mm)	0.99 (25)	0.91 (23)	1.02 (26)	1.36 (35)	1.06 (27)	0.82 (21)	1.72 (44)	1.87 (47)	1.13 (29)	0.90 (23)	0.86 (22)	0.88 (22)	13.52 (344)
Average snowfall inches (cm)	18.8 (48)	20.1 (51)	21.1 (54)	26.6 (68)	11.8 (30)	0.8 (2.0)	0.2 (0.51)	0.0 (0.0)	1.0 (2.5)	13.8 (35)	25.1 (64)	17.6 (45)	156.9 (400.01)
Average precipitation days (≥ 0.01 in)	10.5	10.8	10.9	11.9	9.2	6.4	12.1	13.8	8.6	7.8	9.1	9.7	120.8
Average snowy days (≥ 0.1 in)	10.0	8.5	9.0	9.5	3.8	0.3	0.1	0.0	0.5	3.0	7.4	7.2	59.3
Source 1: NOAA
Source 2: National Weather Service

== Demographics ==
Historical population
Census	Pop.	Note	%±
1880	14,820		—
1890	10,384		−29.9%
1900	12,455		19.9%
1910	7,508		−39.7%
1920	4,959		−34.0%
1930	3,771		−24.0%
1940	4,774		26.6%
1950	4,081		−14.5%
1960	4,008		−1.8%
1970	4,314		7.6%
1980	3,879		−10.1%
1990	2,629		−32.2%
2000	2,821		7.3%
2010	2,602		−7.8%
2020	2,633		1.2%
U.S. Decennial Census

=== 2020 census ===
As of the 2020 census, Leadville had a population of 2,633. The median age was 38.0 years. 16.0% of residents were under the age of 18 and 13.4% of residents were 65 years of age or older. For every 100 females there were 115.6 males, and for every 100 females age 18 and over there were 117.9 males age 18 and over.

99.8% of residents lived in urban areas, while 0.2% lived in rural areas.

There were 1,250 households in Leadville, of which 20.7% had children under the age of 18 living in them. Of all households, 32.2% were married-couple households, 33.1% were households with a male householder and no spouse or partner present, and 23.9% were households with a female householder and no spouse or partner present. About 37.1% of all households were made up of individuals and 10.1% had someone living alone who was 65 years of age or older.

There were 1,693 housing units, of which 26.2% were vacant. The homeowner vacancy rate was 1.6% and the rental vacancy rate was 9.5%.

Racial composition as of the 2020 census
Race	Number	Percent
White	1,995	75.8%
Black or African American	12	0.5%
American Indian and Alaska Native	53	2.0%
Asian	28	1.1%
Native Hawaiian and Other Pacific Islander	4	0.2%
Some other race	219	8.3%
Two or more races	322	12.2%
Hispanic or Latino (of any race)	654	24.8%

=== 2000 census ===
As of the 2000 census, there were 2,821 people, 1,253 households, and 675 families residing in the city. The population density was 2,659.5 inhabitants per square mile (1,026.8/km^{2}). There were 1,514 housing units at an average density of 1,427.3 per square mile (551.1/km^{2}). The racial makeup of the city was 83.52% White, 0.14% African American, 1.28% Native American, 0.32% Asian, 0.11% Pacific Islander, 12.34% from other races, and 2.30% from two or more races. Hispanic or Latino of any race were 25.45% of the population.

There were 1,253 households, out of which 24.7% had children under the age of 18 living with them, 40.7% were married couples living together, 8.5% had a female householder with no husband present, and 46.1% were non-families. 35.0% of all households were made up of individuals, and 9.2% had someone living alone who was 65 years of age or older. The average household size was 2.23 and the average family size was 2.91.

In the city, the population was spread out, with 22.1% under the age of 18, 12.1% from 18 to 24, 34.4% from 25 to 44, 22.0% from 45 to 64, and 10.4% who were 65 years of age or older. The median age was 34 years. For every 100 females, there were 109.1 males. For every 100 females age 18 and over, there were 107.8 males.

The median income for a household in the city was $36,714, and the median income for a family was $44,444. Males had a median income of $28,125 versus $23,512 for females. The per capita income for the city was $20,607. About 9.1% of families and 13.3% of the population were below the poverty line, including 18.5% of those under age 18 and 7.5% of those age 65 or over.

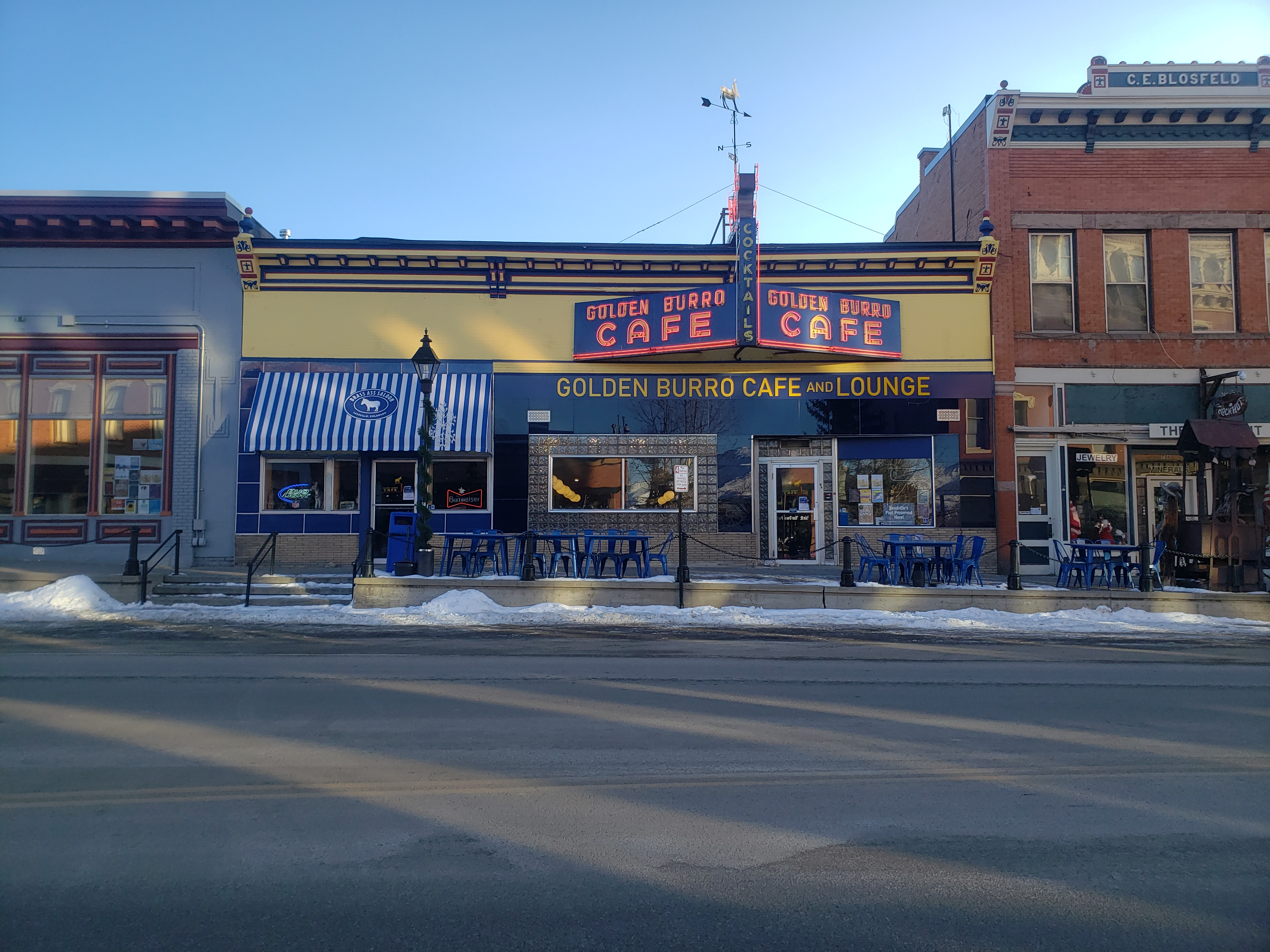
Restored Golden Burro Cafe and Brass Ass Saloon, December 2022 (Leadville, Colorado)

== Arts and culture ==
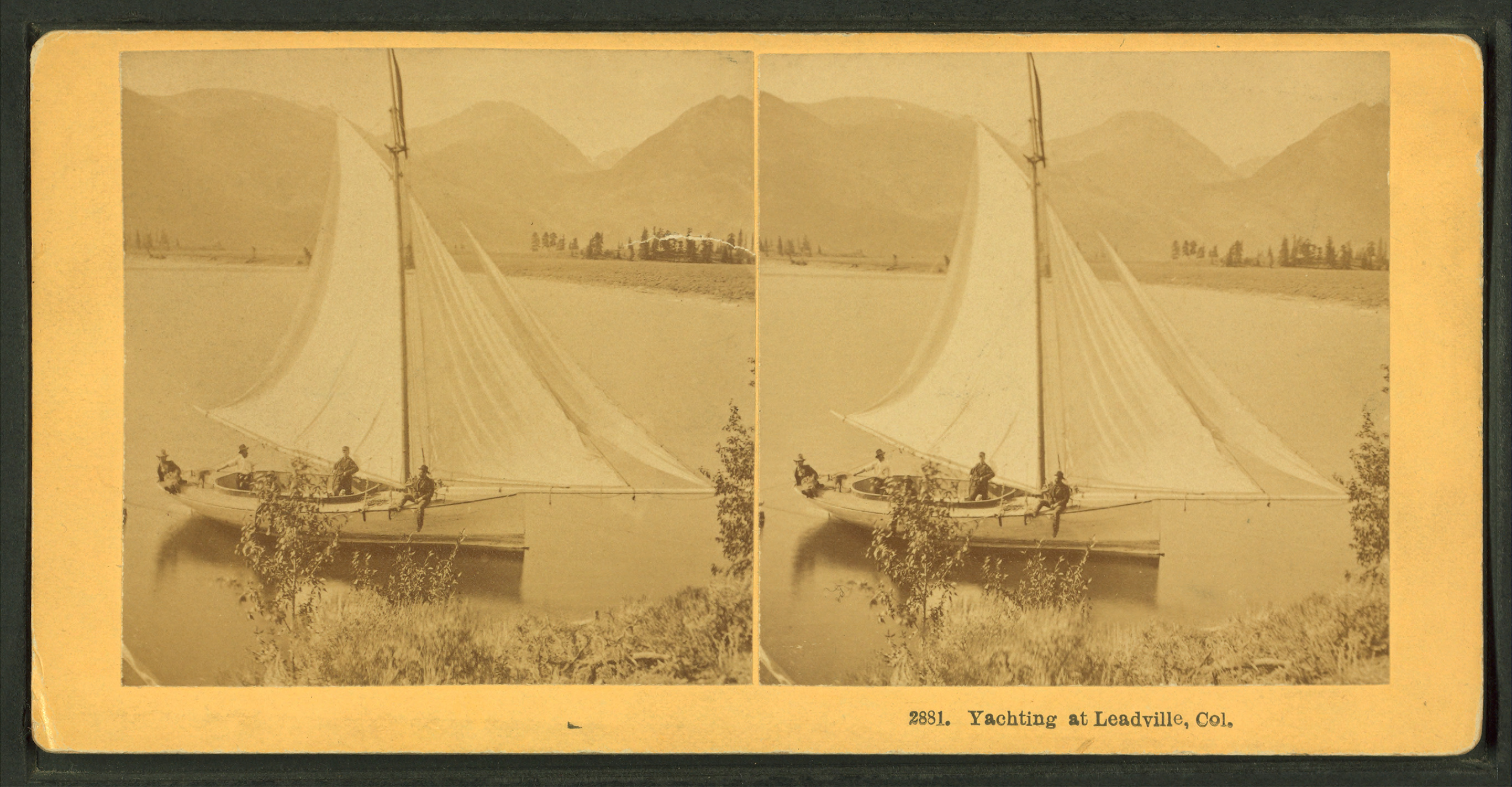
"Yachting at Leadville, Col." Stereoscopic view, around 1880

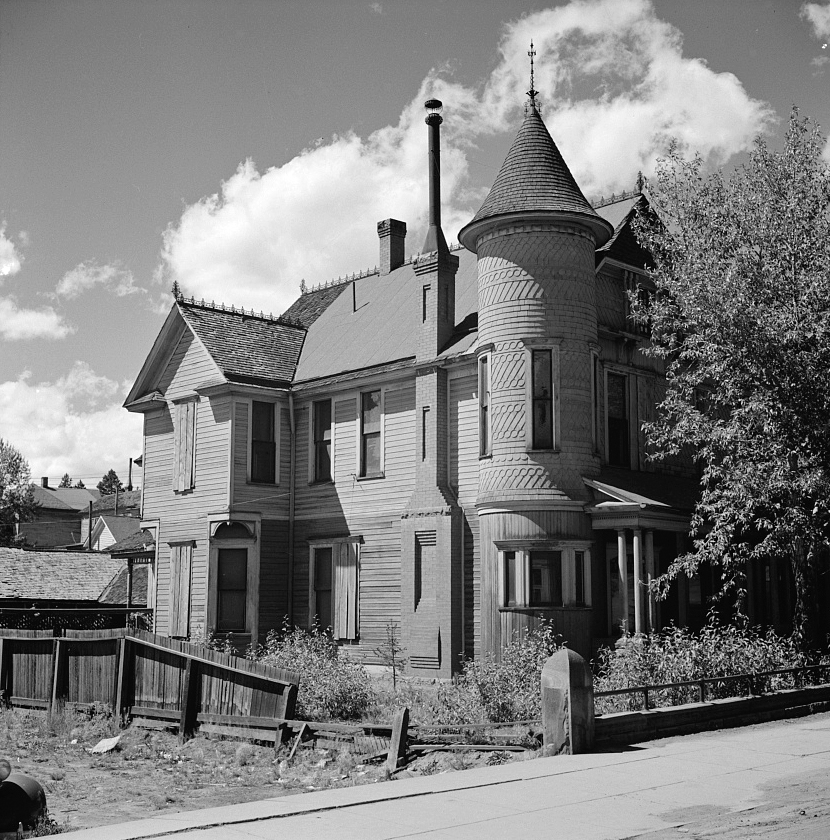
Old Queen Anne Victorian style house, Leadville (Marion Post Wolcott, photographer)

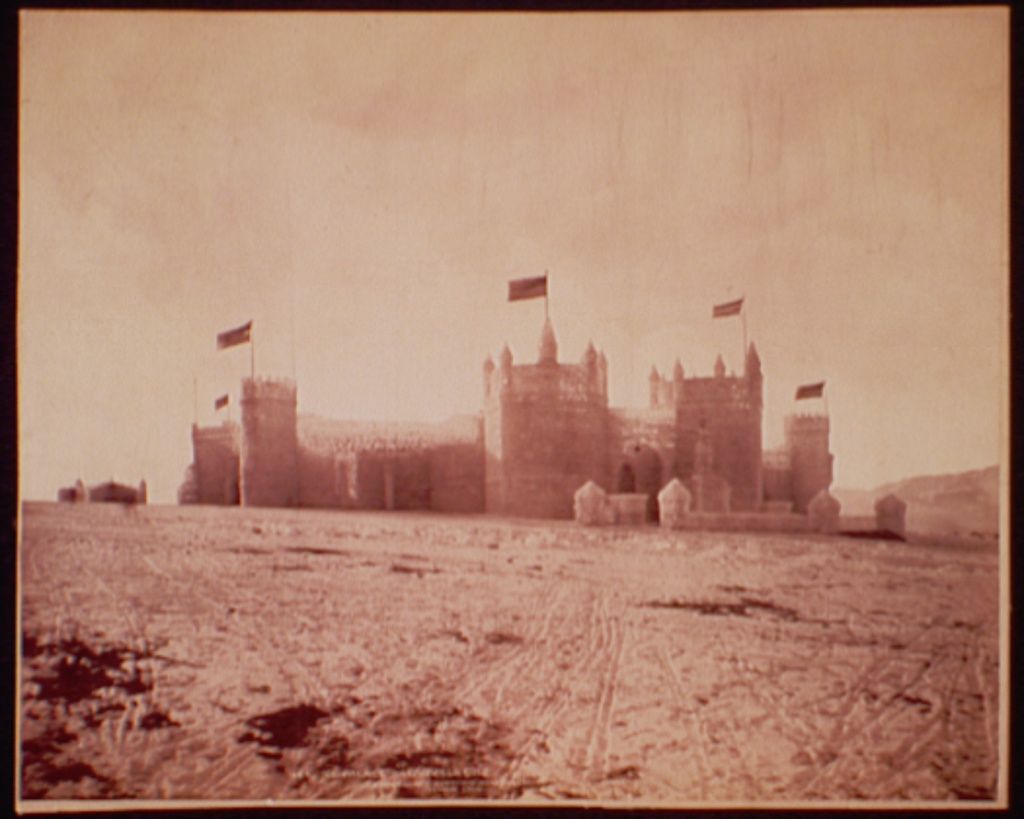
Ice Palace, Leadville, Colorado, 1896

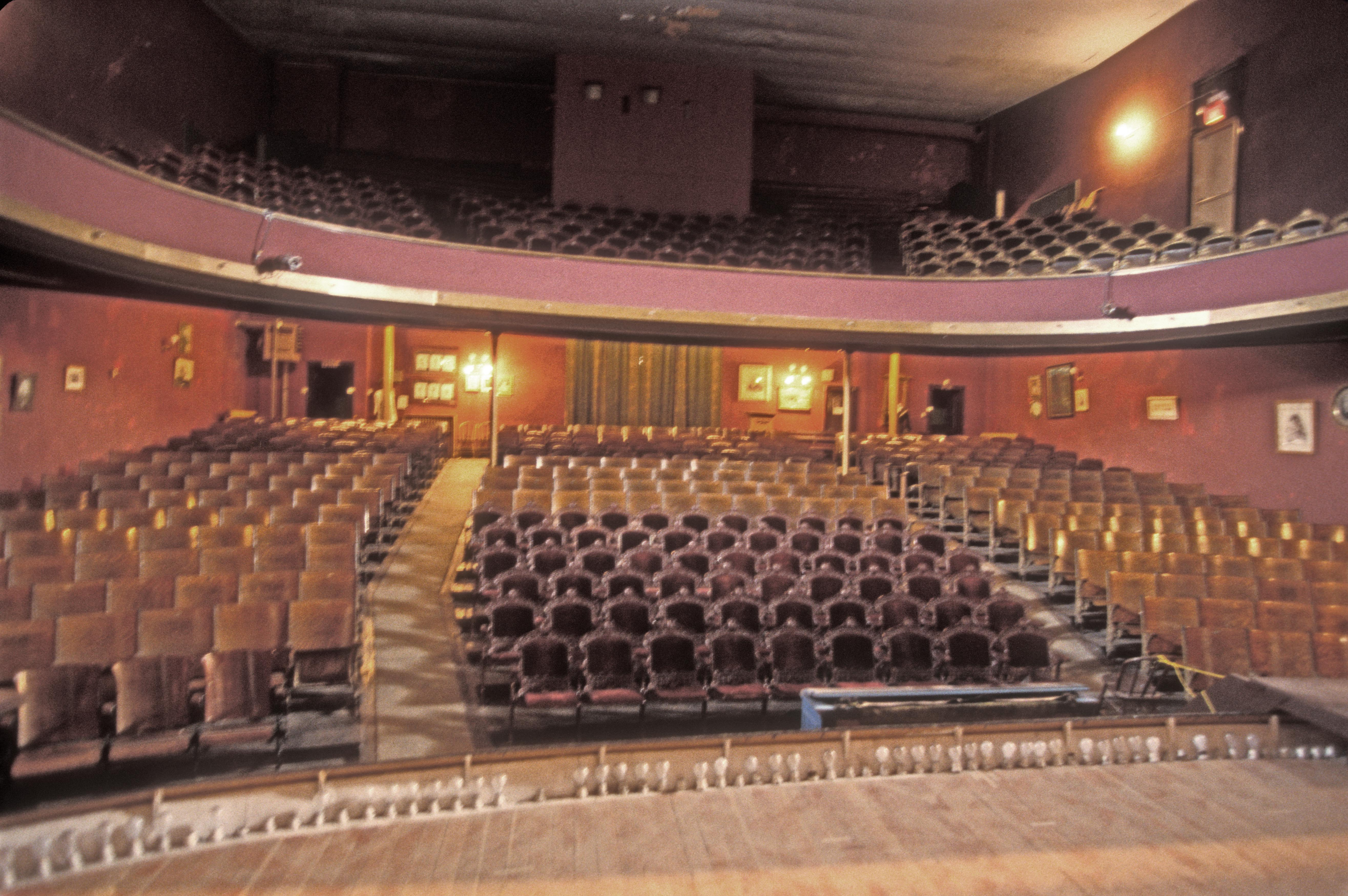
Tabor Opera House

=== Historic sites and districts ===
The Leadville Historic District was designated a National Historic Landmark District in 1961. The district encompasses 67 mines east of the city up to the 12,000-foot (3,700 m) elevation, and a defined portion of the village area, with specific exclusions for various buildings. The principal historic buildings are the Tabor Grand Hotel, St George's Church, Temple Israel, African Methodist Episcopal Church (est. 1881), the Annunciation Church, Tabor Opera House, City Hall, Healy House, Dexter Cabin, Engelbach House, Tabor House, and the Golden Burro Cafe and Lounge, as well as mining structures and small homes.

The National Mining Hall of Fame on West 9th Street is dedicated to commemorating the work of miners and people that work with natural resources. It is listed on the National Register of Historic Places. Major exhibits include an elaborate model railroad, a walk-through replica of an underground hardrock mine, the Gold Rush Room with specimens of native gold, a large collection of mineral specimens, and a mining art gallery. The site also includes the Matchless Mine and cabin, former home of Baby Doe Tabor.

Some historic sites are linked by the Mineral Belt National Recreation Trail, an 11.6-mile (18.7 km) all-season biking/walking trail that loops around Leadville and through its historic mining district. In part it follows old mining-camp railbeds. Interpretative kiosks recount the history and a photograph of what was on that particular site more than a century ago. The trail is well-marked with interpretive signs and altitude and mileage markers.

Created by Executive Order in 1889 to increase the supply of fish for inland waters, the Leadville National Fish Hatchery was established.

The Evergreen Cemetery was the first cemetery in Leadville, established on November 1, 1879.

The town's first library was built in 1904.

A federal building was built in 1905 on Harrison Avenue and 8th Street. It served as the town post office until 1973.

=== Events ===
Boom Days, held on the first full weekend of August, is a tribute to the city's mining past. The event has been honored by Congress as a Local Legacy Event. The festivities held over three days include mining competitions, burro racing, motorcycle games, a rod and gun show, the "mosey", live music, and a craft fair and parade.

The annual skijoring event and Crystal Carnival take place in March. This is a horse-drawn skiing event held on Harrison Avenue since 1949. Norwegian celebrities Vegard Ylvisåker and Nicolay Ramm participated in the 2026 Leadville skijoring event as a part of the TV show "Helt Ramme sporter" for the Norwegian Broadcasting Corporation.

The town holds the "St. Patrick's Day Practice Parade" on or around September 17, six months after St. Patrick's Day. This tradition was established due to the combined factors of the city experiencing heavy snowfall and cold temperatures in March, and the city's traditionally large Irish population. The people of Leadville therefore celebrate the holiday in the more mild September weather.

The Leadville Trail 100, an ultramarathon, takes place each August since 1983 on an out-and-back course on trails around Turquoise Lake, over Hagerman Pass, the Colorado Trail, through Twin Lakes, across the Arkansas River, up and over Hope Pass, to the ghost town of Winfield.

The "Route of the Silver Kings" is a driving tour of the 20-square-mile (52 km^{2}) historic mining district. The tour passes mines, power plants, ghost towns and mining camps.

== Parks and recreation ==
Situated within the San Isabel National Forest and surrounded by three wilderness areas, Leadville is popular with hikers and campers.

The Mineral Belt Trail is an 11.6-mile (18.7 km), two-way non-motorized paved trail around the city. There are five access points.

== Education ==
=== K-12 education ===
Leadville's K-12 education is served by the Lake County School District.

=== Higher education ===
Leadville is home to a campus of Colorado Mountain College. At an elevation of 10,200 feet, CMC Leadville is the highest elevation college campus in the United States. The Leadville campus is also home to Colorado Mountain College's cross-country team.

== Infrastructure ==
=== Transportation ===
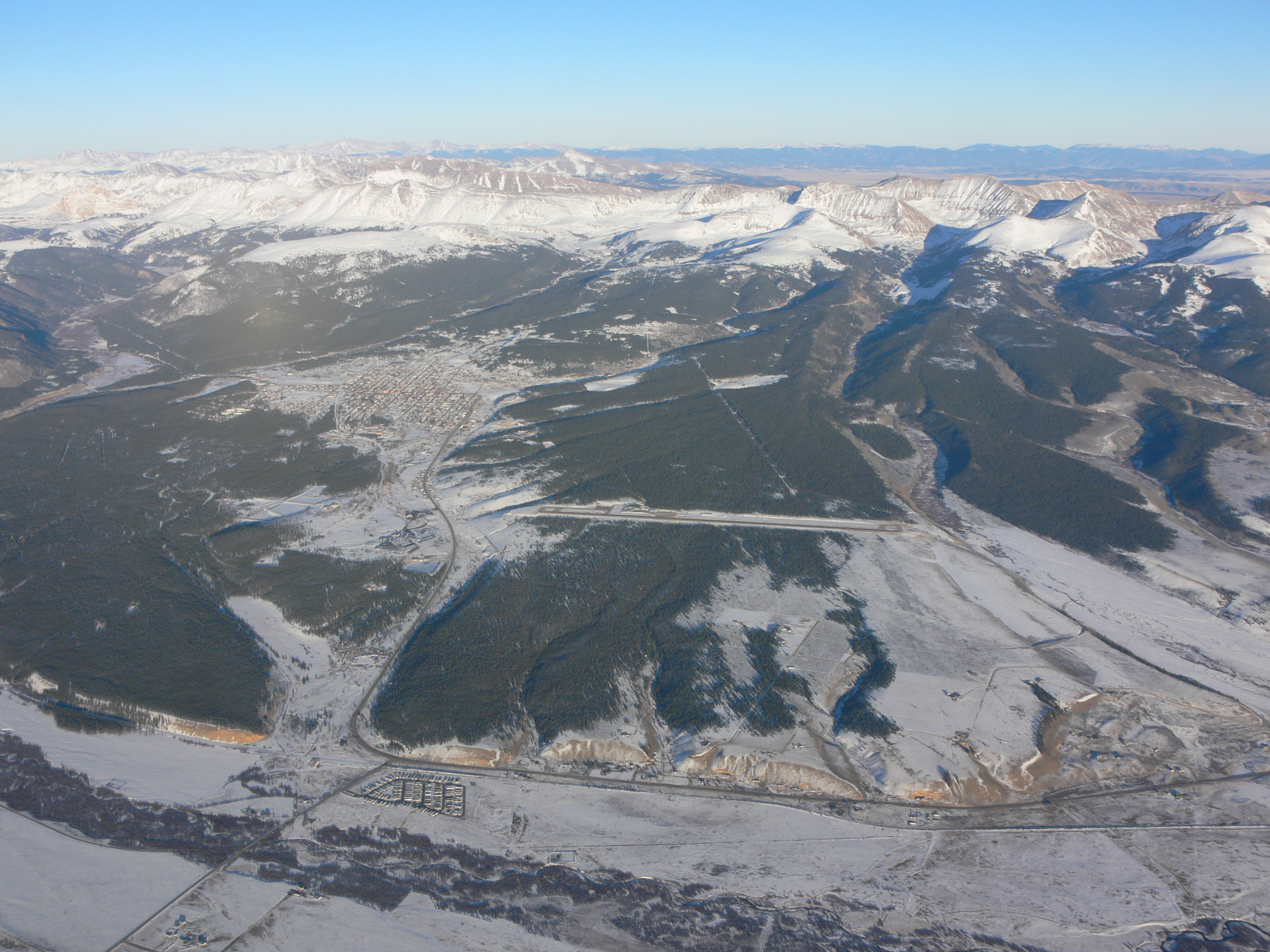
Aerial view of Lake County Airport and Leadville, December 2006

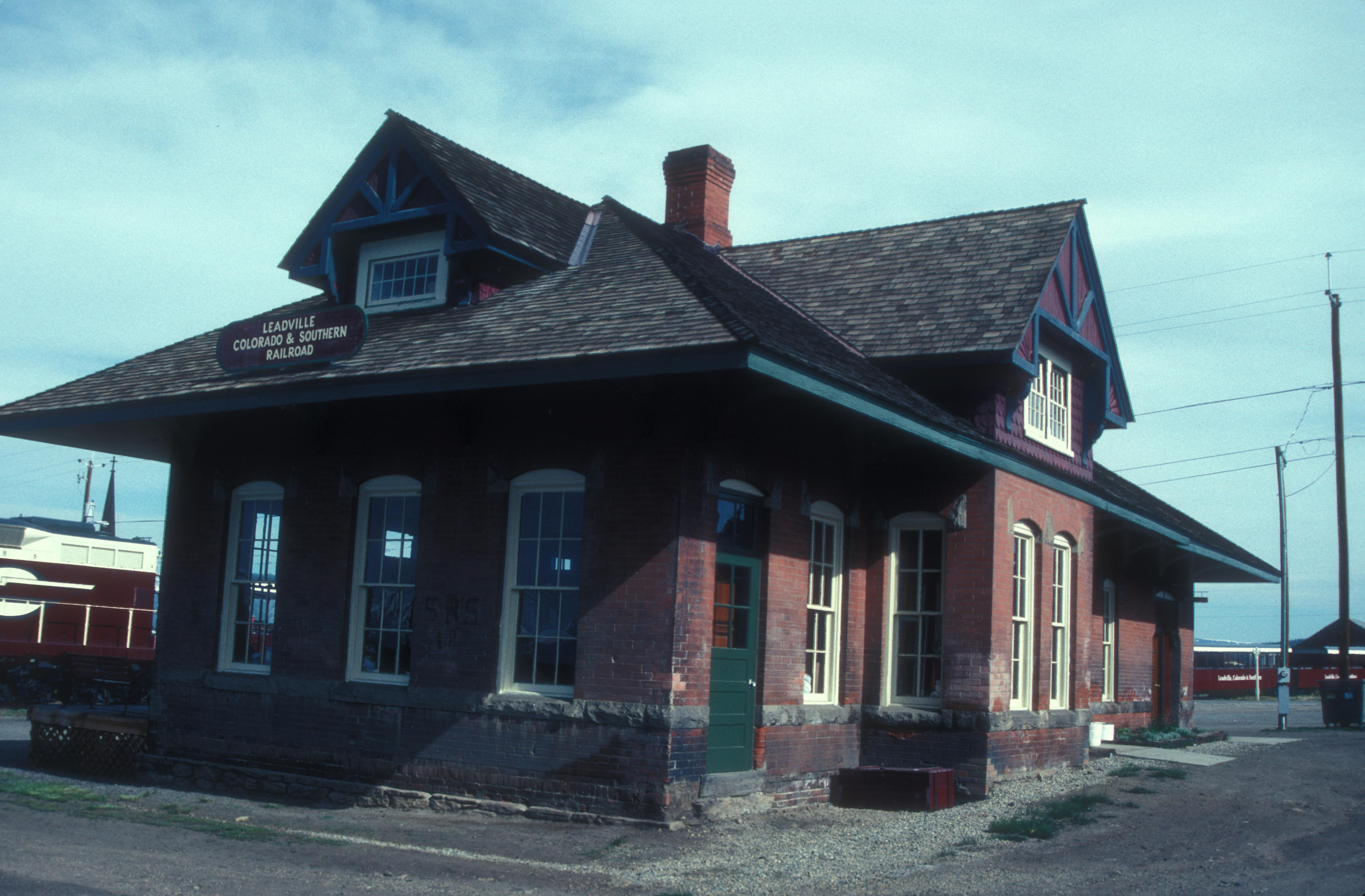
Leadville Historic Colorado and Southern Railroad Station - photo taken in 2007

Leadville is served by Lake County Airport, North America's highest public use airport at an altitude of 9,934 feet (3,028 m).

==== Highways ====
- US 24
- State Highway 91
- Top of the Rockies Byway, a National Scenic Byway.

==== Railways ====
- On July 22, 1880, the Denver & Rio Grande Railway arrived on a 3 feet (0.91 m) narrow-gauge railway branch from Malta, 4 miles (6 km) to the west. General Grant and his wife were on hand to celebrate the arrival. Third rail was added in 1888, and from 1940 it was only standard gauge. The last 1.8 miles (2.9 km) were abandoned by Union Pacific in 1998. This severed the connection between the Leadville, Colorado & Southern Railroad and the rest of the railroad system. The remaining three miles from Malta have not seen any traffic in many years.
  - In the past, D&RG operated branch lines from Leadville to Oro City (1883–1941), Ibex/Chrysolite (1898–1944), Graham Park (1898–1941) and Fryer Hill (1881–1944). Another branch run over Fremont Pass as far as Robinson, Wheeler, and Dillon (1881/2-1923).
- In 1887, the Colorado Midland Railway arrived in Leadville.
- The former Colorado & Southern Railway line from Leadville to Climax is now operated as a tourist line by the Leadville, Colorado & Southern Railroad.
- In 2010, rail and coach commuter service was proposed between Minturn and Dotsero, in 2012 from Leadville to Vail and Dotsero with intermediate stations at Minturn, Avon, Eagle and Gypsum.

== See also ==
- Twin Lakes, Colorado
