= Temple Israel (Leadville, Colorado) =

Historic synagogue, now museum, in Leadville, Colorado, US

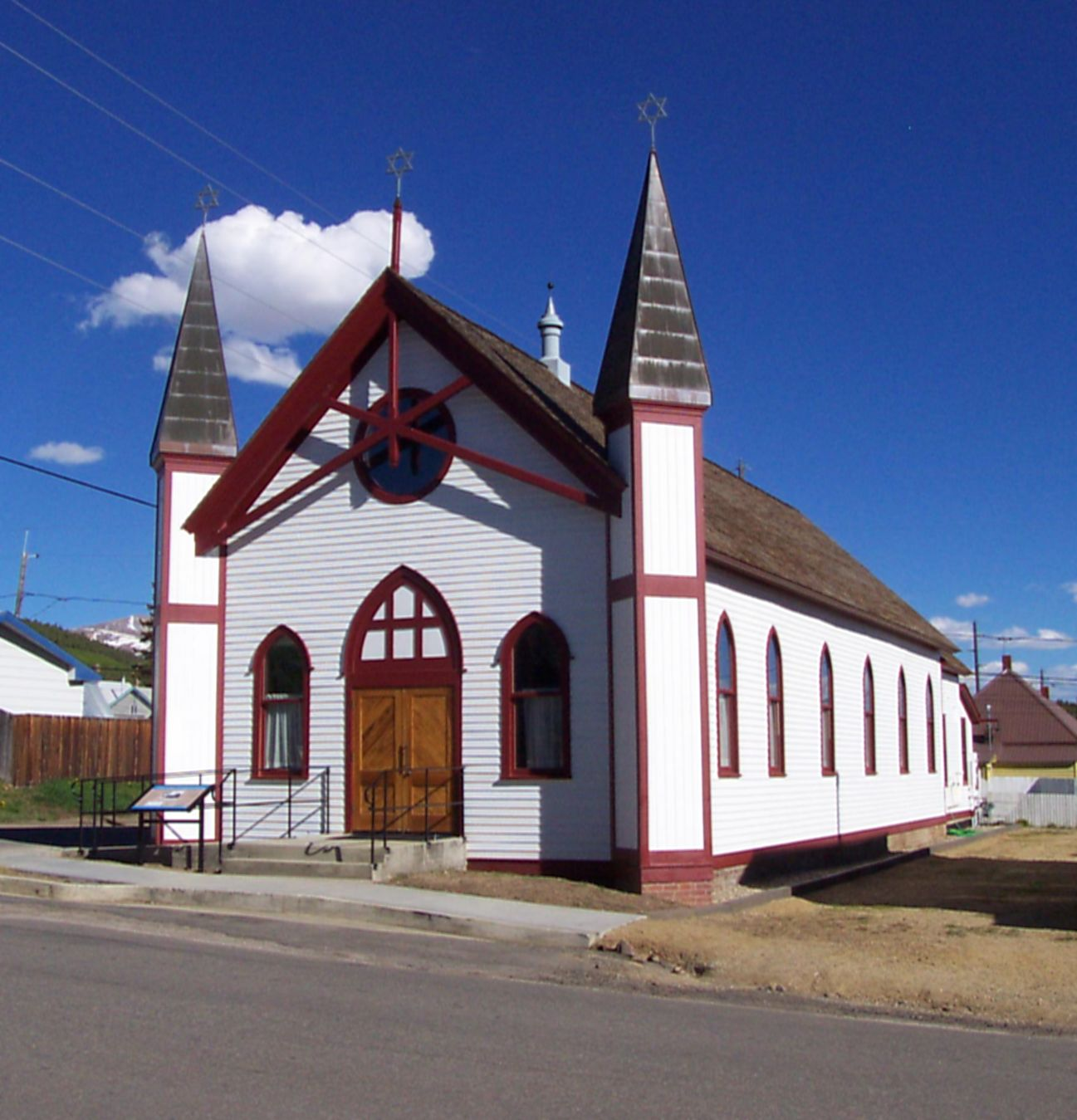
- The former Temple Israel, in 2011

- Location in Colorado

Religion
- Affiliation: Reform Judaism (former)
- Ecclesiastical or organizational status: Synagogue (1884–1914); Residential (1937–1955); Parsonage (1955–1966); Residential (1966–1992); Jewish museum (since c. 2006)
- Ownership: Temple Israel Foundation
- Year consecrated: 2009 (reconsecration)

Location
- Location: 201 West 4th Street, Leadville, Colorado 80461
- Country: United States
- Interactive map of Temple Israel
- Coordinates: 39°14′44″N 106°17′53″W

Architecture
- Architects: George E. King (1884); Long Hoeft Architects (2008)
- Type: Synagogue architecture
- Style: Carpenter Gothic
- General contractor: Robert Murdoch (1884); Pat Kelly Maintenance (2008)
- Groundbreaking: August, 1884
- Completed: 1884 (built); 2008 (restored)
- Construction cost: US$4,000

Specifications
- Direction of façade: North
- Capacity: 84, originally 156 est.
- Length: interior: 72 feet (22 m)
- Width: interior: 24 feet (7.3 m)
- Height (max): 32 feet (9.8 m)
- Materials: Wood frame

Website
- http://www.jewishleadville.org/

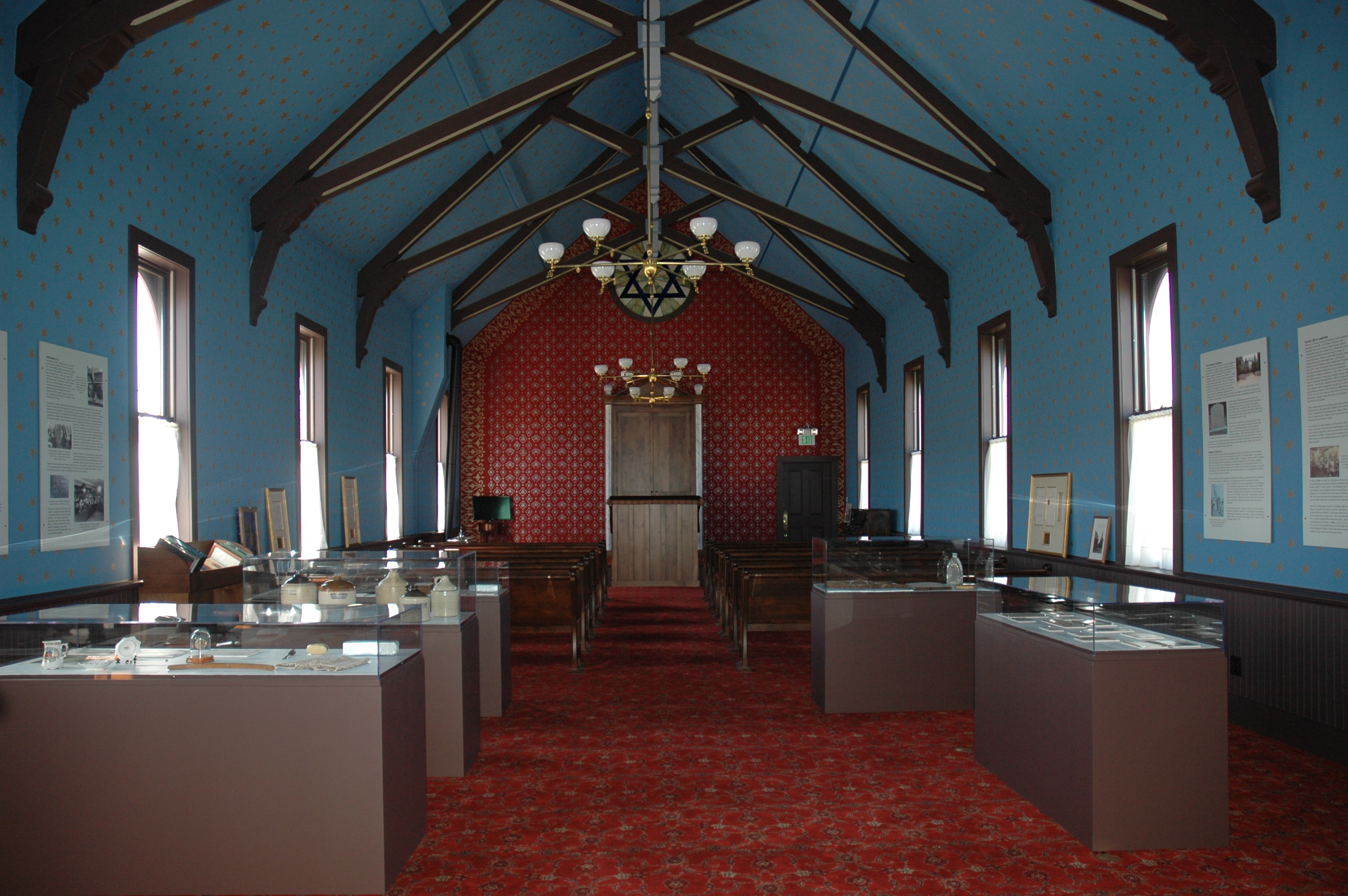
Temple Israel, restored interior

Temple Israel is a former synagogue, now Jewish history museum, located at 201 West 4th Street in Leadville, Colorado, in the United States. The former synagogue was erected during the summer of 1884 in less than two months. The Temple Israel building is a rare example of a frontier synagogue.

== History ==
The small, 25 ft × 72 ft (7.6 m × 21.9 m), Carpenter Gothic structure was designed by George E. King (Note: George Edward King was Leadville's leading commercial architect between 1878 and 1886. In addition to the Temple Israel building, he was responsible for the following structures: the Tabor Grand Hotel; the Delaware Hotel; the 9th Street School; the Central School; the U.S. Post Office; the Lake County Court House; the Clipper Building (Silver Dollar Saloon); and his own home at 212 West 9th Street. King's portfolio also included "Old Main" at Colorado State University, the Arnett-Fullen House in Boulder, and in Mexico: the Casino Club in Juarez; the Opera House in Zacatas; and the Opera House in Mexico City.) and constructed by Robert Murdock (Note: Robert M. Murdock was very active as a contractor in Leadville during its silver boom period. He was responsible for the construction of the Tabor Grand Hotel (1884-5), the Breene Block [SE corner, Harrison & 4th] (1887-8), the Armory building [140 E 5th] (1888), and residences for B.F. Follett [W 8th], J.H. Stotesbury [Pine & 8th], and Theodore Schults [Pine & 7th] (1887) amongst many other projects.) for $4,000 on land donated by the silver baron Horace A. W. Tabor. Dedicated during services for Rosh Hashanah on September 19, 1884, the Reform synagogue served an interesting group of Jewish pioneers. Typically downtown merchants, they were an active element in the larger community as exemplified by David May, merchant and founder of the May department stores, County treasurer, vice president of the Congregation Israel, and chairman of its building committee.

The congregation splintered in 1892 when the more orthodox members created Knesseth Israel. Regular services in Temple Israel ceased by 1908 and the building was entirely out of service by 1914.

Steve Malin acquired the building in 1937, stripping it of the steeples and re-roofing it. He lived with his wife and two daughters in rooms in the back whilst conducting his automobile radiator repair business in the front. During World War II, the synagogue building functioned as a dormitory/boarding house for mine workers and was sold in 1955 to the St. George Episcopal Church across West 4th Street to be their parsonage. The building returned to private ownership in 1966 and was subsequently converted into a four unit apartment house.

=== Restoration and use as a museum ===
The Temple Israel Foundation bought the building in 1992 and, after a fire in 2006, restored the synagogue to its original condition. The Temple Israel building now occasionally hosts services but mainly functions as a museum dedicated to the pioneer Jews of Leadville.

== Cemetery ==
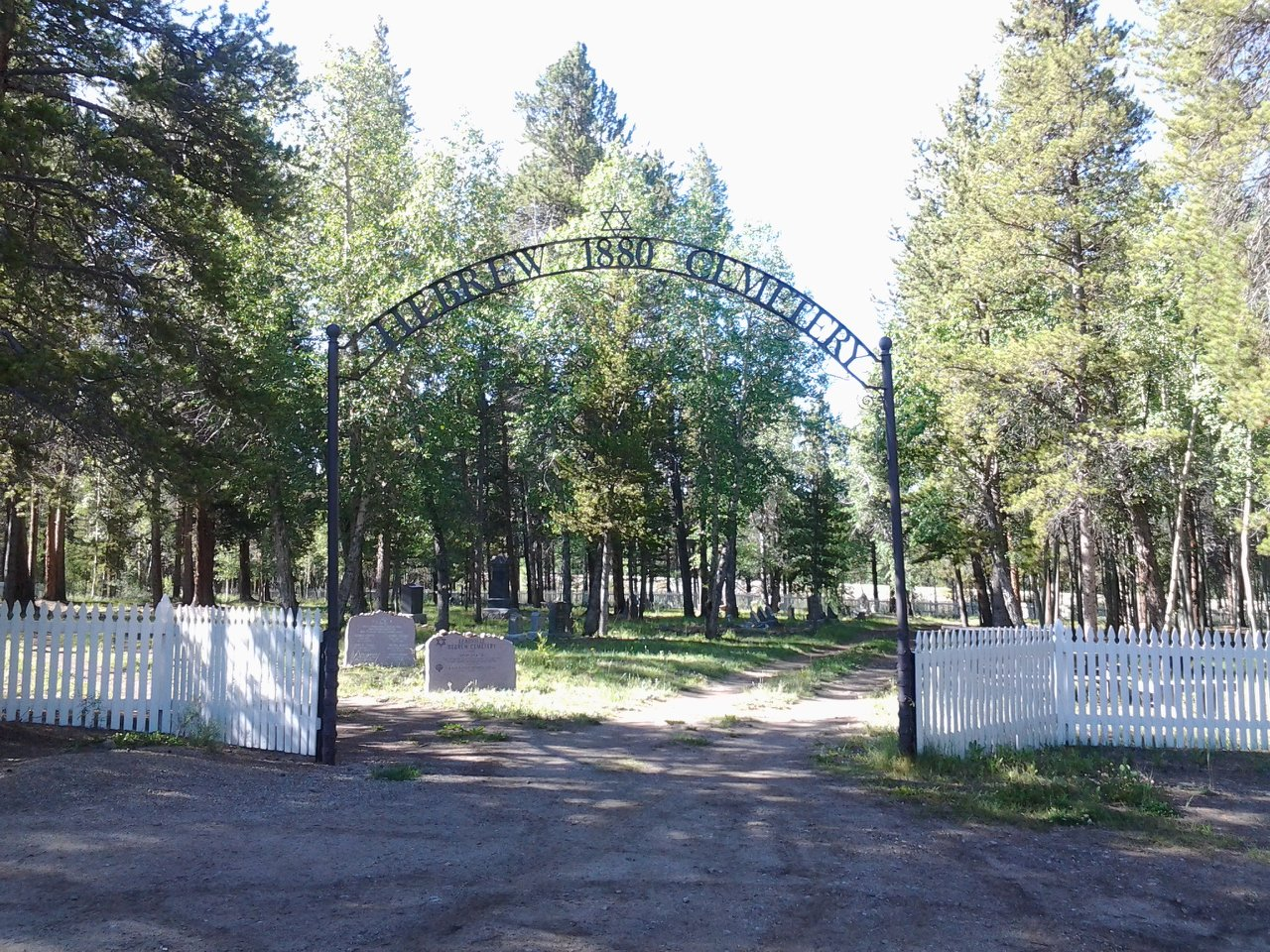
Entrance to the Leadville Hebrew Cemetery

The Temple Israel Foundation also maintains the Leadville Hebrew Cemetery, to which it gained title in 1993. The cemetery is located outside of Leadville, about 3/4 of a mile from the synagogue. Records show that 132 people were interred in this cemetery from its establishment in 1880 through 1981, though only 5 of those died after 1930. 59 of the original headstones remain, and the Foundation has provided markers for those that are missing. The Foundation opened a section of the cemetery for new interments in 2001 with space for 51 graves, of which 8 were occupied as of 2015. The cemetery is largely maintained through a volunteer effort led by the Denver chapter of B'nai B'rith.
