= Healy House Museum =

Historic house in Colorado, United States

- Healy House
- U.S. National Register of Historic Places
- U.S. Historic district – Contributing property
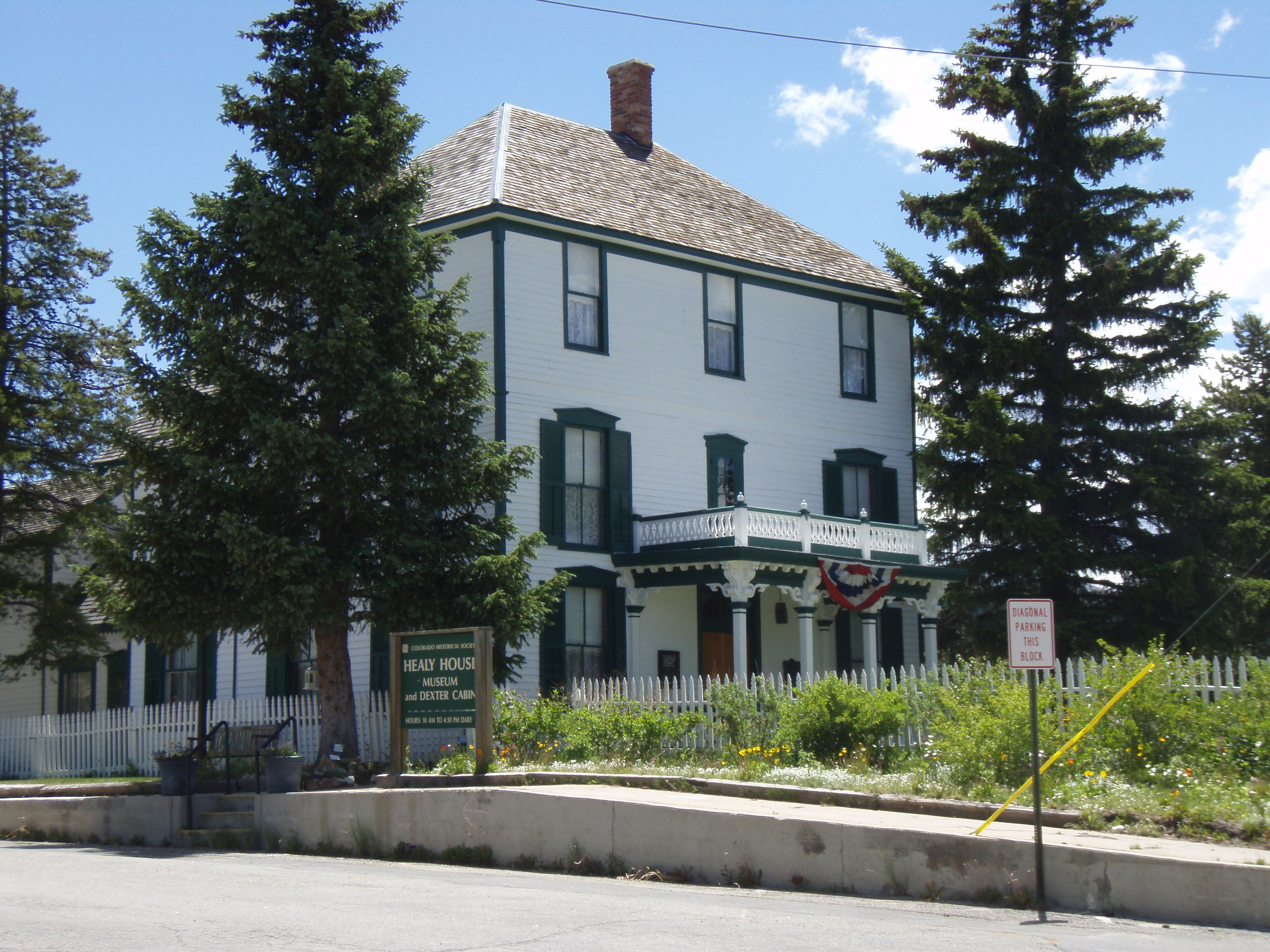

- Location within Colorado Location within the United States
- Location: Leadville, Colorado
- Coordinates: 39.25188°N 106.29258°W
- Built: 1878
- Architect: August R. Meyer
- NRHP reference No.: 70000164
- Added to NRHP: August 25, 1970

Healy House Museum was the Leadville, Colorado home built in 1878 by mining engineer and city father August R. Meyer for his bride, Emma. It was purchased in 1888 by Daniel Healy (1857-1912), who operated a boarding house with his cousin Nellie Healy. An immigrant from Ireland, Healy served Leadville as a mail carrier and later assistant postmaster. He subsequently started several successful businesses and represented Leadville in Colorado's state legislature from 1903 to 1905.

After Daniel Healy had died in 1912, the house was given to his sister, nieces, and cousin Nellie Healy. Nellie continued to live in and operate the boarding house until 1936. She donated the house to the historical association in 1936 under the condition that the house be used to benefit the city. In 1938, Clara Gaw Norton oversaw restoration work at the house paid for through grant money from the Boettcher Foundation. Norton hoped to turn the Healy House into the city's first history museum.

Healy House was listed on the National Register of Historic Places in 1970.

Currently it is a Colorado State Historic Site and is operated as a Victorian era museum by the state under History Colorado, together with Dexter Cabin. The two are located within the Leadville Historic District, which is itself a National Historic Landmark.

The restored house serves as an example of the "Elegant Eighties".
