= Dexter Cabin =

Historic house in Colorado, United States

- U.S. National Register of Historic Places
- U.S. Historic district – Contributing property
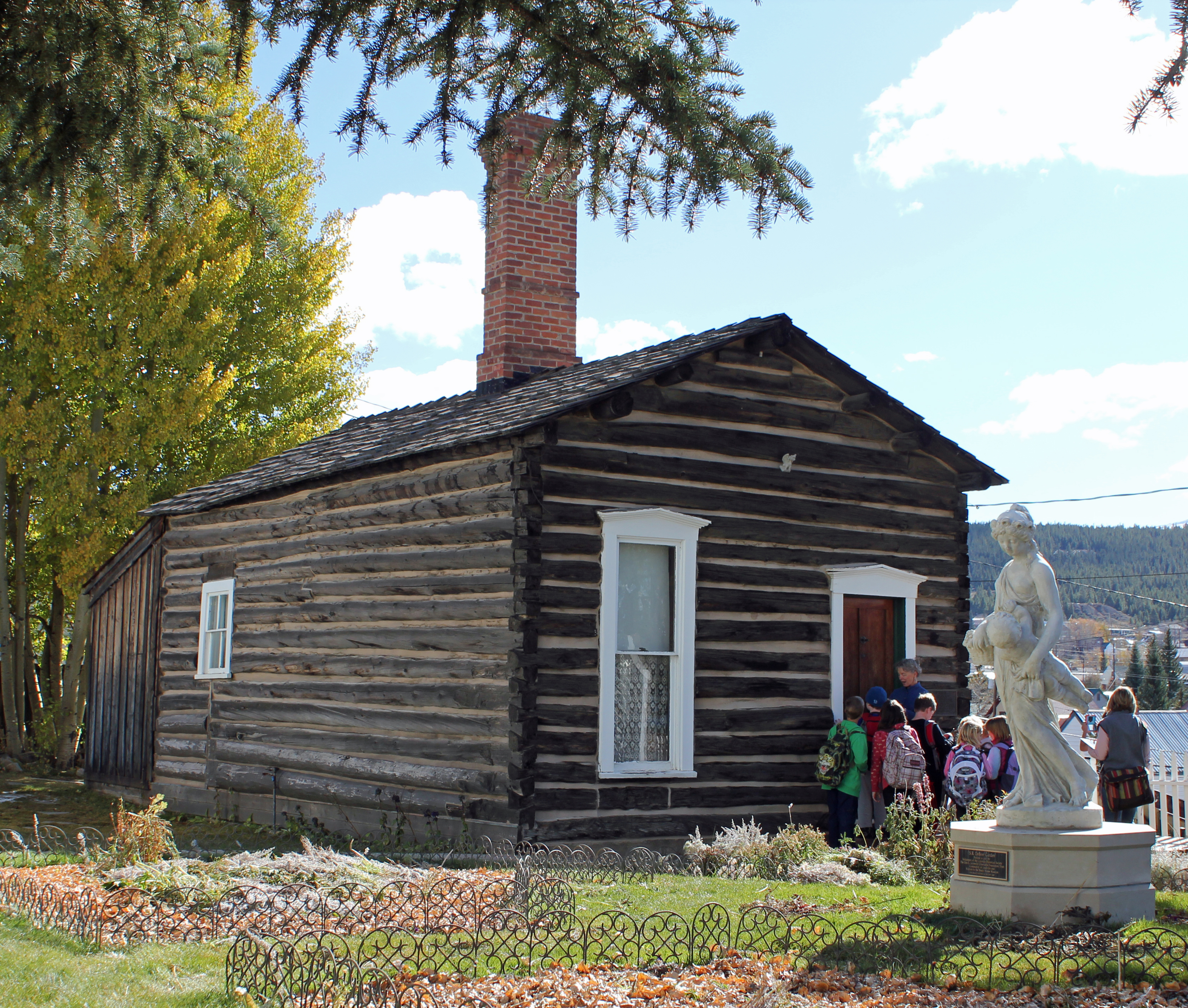
- The cabin in 2011.

- Location within Colorado Location within the United States
- Location: 912 Harrison Avenue, Leadville, Colorado, United States
- Coordinates: 39°15′7″N 106°17′17″W
- Built: 1879
- NRHP reference No.: 70000163
- Added to NRHP: August 25, 1970

Dexter Cabin was the Leadville, Colorado home and hunting lodge of James V. Dexter, a mining investor and businessman. Although it is a cabin, the interior has been described as "surprisingly plush," "elegantly finished," and "incredibly ornate.".

It is a Colorado State Historic Site and is operated as a museum by the state under History Colorado, together with Healy House. The two are located within the Leadville Historic District, which is itself a National Historic Landmark. Dexter Cabin was moved to its present location next to Healy House.

Dexter Cabin was listed on the National Register of Historic Places in 1970.

== See also ==
- National Register of Historic Places listings in Lake County, Colorado
