= List of Superfund sites in Colorado =

Coordinates: 38.9972°N 105.5478°W

The location of the State of Colorado in the United States of America.

This is a list of Superfund sites in the U.S. State of Colorado designated under the Comprehensive Environmental Response, Compensation, and Liability Act of 1980 (CERCLA) environmental law. The CERCLA federal law authorized the United States Environmental Protection Agency (EPA) to create a list of polluted locations requiring a long-term response to clean up hazardous material contaminations. These locations are known as Superfund sites, and are placed on the National Priorities List (NPL).

The NPL guides the EPA in "determining which sites warrant further investigation" for environmental remediation. As of May 1, 2010, there were eighteen Superfund sites on the National Priorities List in Colorado. Two more sites have been proposed for entry on the list and three others have been cleaned up and removed from it.

== Superfund sites ==
Proposed for addition to National Priorities List
Deleted from National Priorities List

CERCLIS ID	Name	County	Reason	Proposed	Listed	Construction completed	Partially deleted	Deleted
CO7570090038	Air Force Plant PJKS	Jefferson	Groundwater, surface water, soil and buildings contaminated by TCE, PCBs and NDMA.	07/14/1989	11/21/1989	–	–	–
COD007063530	ASARCO, Inc. (Globe Plant)	Adams	Groundwater, surface water, sediment and soil contamination by cadmium, lead, arsenic and zinc from metals smelting and refining.	05/10/1993	–	–	–	–
COD000110254	Broderick Wood Products	Adams	Soil, surface water and groundwater contamination by PAHs, PCP byproducts, dioxins and furans; sludge, liquid waste from a former wood treatment plant.	09/08/1983	09/21/1984	09/30/1996	–	–
COD980717938	California Gulch	Lake	Soil, sediment, surface water and groundwater contamination by lead, arsenic other metals and acidic mine drainage, and liquid and solid waste and sludge from mining, milling and smelting. (see Leadville mining district)	07/14/1989	11/21/1989	–	04/16/2001 07/23/2001 04/22/2002 01/12/2010	
COD981551427	Captain Jack Mill	Boulder	Solid waste, soil and surface water contamination by zinc, cadmium, copper and lead from mining and smelting.	04/30/2003	09/29/2003	–	–	–
COD980717557	Central City/Clear Creek	Clear Creek	Soil, groundwater and surface water contamination, leaching and liquid waste contaminated with heavy metals such as zinc, copper, manganese, cadmium, lead and arsenic, from mining and milling operations within the watershed. (see Argo Tunnel)	12/30/1982	09/08/1983	–	–	–
COD007431620	Chemical Sales Company	Denver	Liquid and solid waste, groundwater, air and soil contamination by various compounds.	06/24/1988	08/30/1990	03/27/2000	–	–
COD980716955	Denver Radium Site	Denver	Air, soil and groundwater contamination by radium, thorium, uranium, arsenic, lead and radon gas from radium ore processing.	12/30/1982	09/08/1983	09/27/2006	–	–
COD081961518	Eagle Mine	Eagle	Groundwater, surface water, solid waste, soil, liquid waste, debris and sediment contaminated by arsenic, cadmium, copper, lead and zinc.	10/15/1984	06/10/1986	09/17/2001	–	–
COD042167858	Lincoln Park	Fremont	Air, groundwater, surface water, and soil are contaminated with radionuclides and metals including molybdenum, uranium, and uranium daughter products from uranium milling by Cotter Corporation.	09/08/1983	09/21/1984	–	–	–
COD980499248	Lowry Landfill	Arapahoe	Liquid and solid waste, debris; soil, surface water, groundwater, sediment and leaching contaminated by chemicals, solvents and sludges; gas emissions from buried waste.	10/08/1983	09/21/1984	09/28/2006	–	–
COD980499255	Marshall Landfill	Boulder	Surface water, ground water, soil and liquid waste contaminated by benzene, TCE, PCE, barium, iron, manganese and zinc.	12/30/1982	09/08/1983	08/25/1993	–	–
CON000802630	Nelson Tunnel/Commodore Waste Rock	Mineral	Surface contamination and mining waste rock pile contaminated with arsenic, cadmium, lead and zinc.	03/19/2008	09/03/2008	–	–	–
CO7890010526	Rocky Flats Plant (DOE)	Jefferson	Soil, surface water, groundwater and air contamination by plutonium, americium, uranium and VOCs from nearly forty years of nuclear weapons manufacturing. The plant was closed after being raided by the Federal Bureau of Investigation and EPA.	07/14/1989	11/21/1989	09/29/2006	05/25/2007	–
CO5210020769	Rocky Mountain Arsenal (US Army)	Adams	Soil, surface water and groundwater contamination by aldrin, dieldrin, DBCP and arsenic from chemical weapons and pesticide manufacture.	10/15/1984	07/22/1987	–	01/21/2003 01/15/2004 07/31/2006	–
COD980717953	Sand Creek Industrial	Adams	Soil, solid waste, liquid waste, groundwater, surface water and air contamination and debris contaminated by VOCs, pesticides, herbicides and arsenic from an oil refinery, a pesticide manufacturing facility, acid pits and a landfill.	12/30/1982	09/08/1983	09/29/1994	–	12/20/1996
COD983769738	Smeltertown	Chaffee	Groundwater, soil and surface water contamination and solid waste contaminated by arsenic, cadmium, copper, lead, manganese, zinc, pentachlorophenol and creosote from smelting, wood treatment and zinc sulfate manufacture.	02/07/1992	–	–	–	–
COD980806277	Smuggler Mountain	Pitkin	Groundwater and soil contamination by lead and cadmium from historical mining operations.	10/15/1984	06/10/1986	09/26/1996	–	09/23/1999
CO0002378230	Standard mine	Gunnison	Surface water, groundwater and soil contamination by arsenic, lead, zinc, cadmium, copper, chromium and manganese from an isolated former mine at 11,000 ft altitude.	04/27/2005	09/14/2005	–	–	–
COD983778432	Summitville mine	Rio Grande	Surface water, groundwater and soil contamination by copper, cadmium, manganese, zinc, lead, nickel, aluminum and iron, leaching into the Alamosa River system from an isolated former mine at 12,500 ft altitude.	05/10/1993	05/31/1994	–	–	–
COD007063274	Uravan Uranium Project (Union Carbide Corp.)	Montrose	Air, groundwater, surface water, soil and sediment contamination and solid waste and debris contaminated with raffinates, raffinate crystals, lead, arsenic, cadmium and vanadium from a radium recovery plant and uranium and vanadium processing.	10/15/1984	06/10/1986	09/29/2008	02/18/2005 09/04/2007	–
CO0002259588	Vasquez Boulevard and I-70	Denver	Lead and arsenic contamination of soil, from metal smelting and/or lawncare products.	01/19/1999	07/22/1999	–	–	–
COD980667075	Woodbury Chemical	Adams	Soil and debris contaminated with chlorinated pesticides, heavy metals and VOCs from former pesticide plant.	12/30/1982	09/08/1983	03/26/1992	–	03/22/1993

== See also ==
- List of Superfund sites in the United States
- List of environmental issues
- List of waste types
- TOXMAP
- Bibliography of Colorado
- Geography of Colorado
- History of Colorado
- Index of Colorado-related articles
- List of Colorado-related lists
- Outline of Colorado
