= Leadville mining district =

Mining district

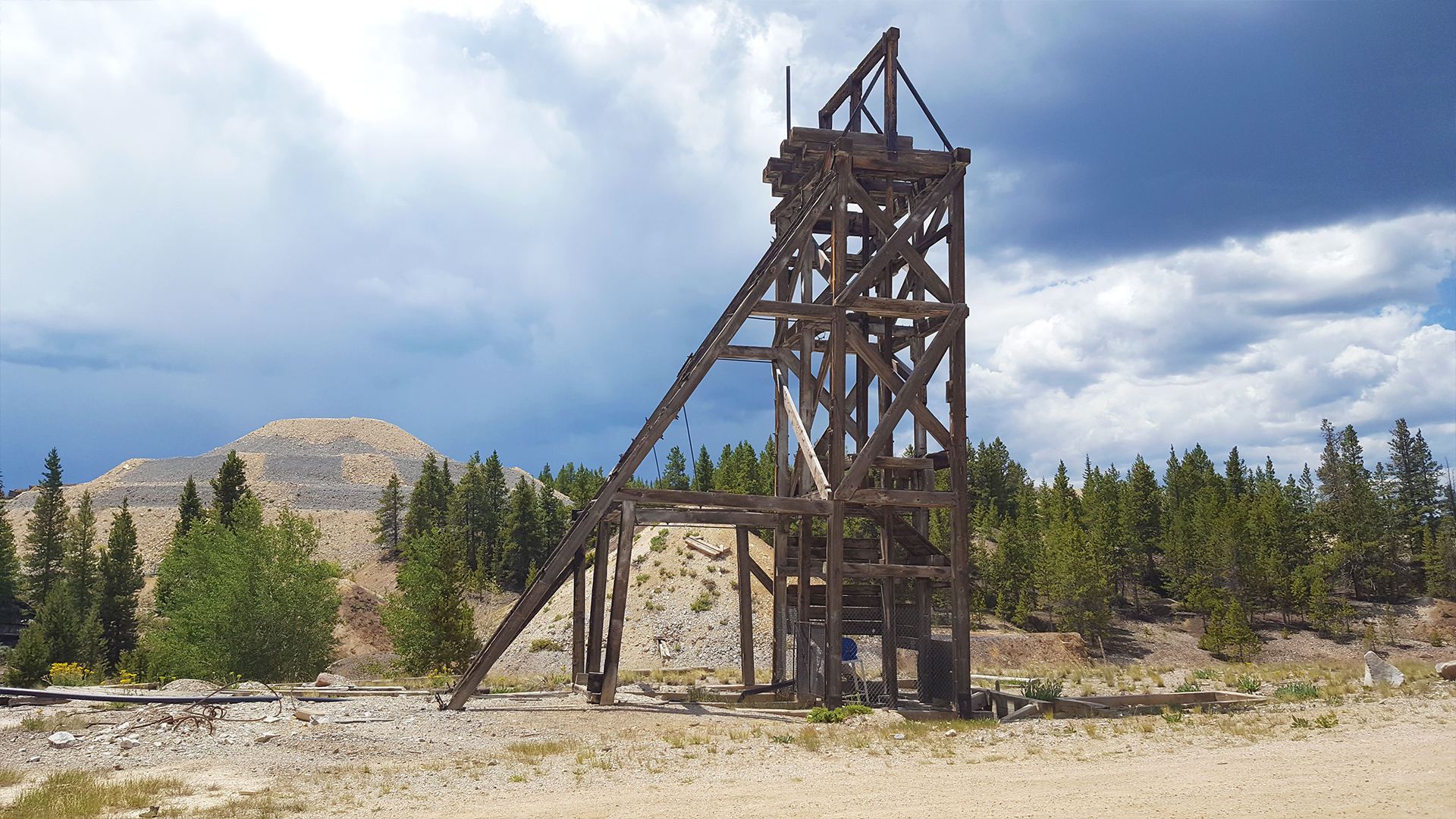
An Abandoned Mine's Headframe near Leadville, Colorado

The Leadville mining district, located in the Colorado Mineral Belt, was the most productive silver-mining district in the state of Colorado and hosts one of the largest lead-zinc-silver deposits in the world. Oro City, an early Colorado gold placer mining town located about a mile east of Leadville in California Gulch, was the location to one of the richest placer gold strikes in Colorado, with estimated gold production of 120,000–150,000 ozt (8,200–10,300 lb; 3,700–4,700 kg), worth $2.5 to $3 million at the then-price of $20.67 per troy ounce.

Cumulative production through 1963 was 240 million troy ounces (16 million pounds; 7.5 million kilograms) of silver, three million troy ounces (210 thousand pounds; 93 thousand kilograms) of gold, 987 million tonnes (2.2 trillion pounds; 987 billion kilograms) of lead, 712 million tonnes (1.6 trillion pounds; 712 billion kilograms) of zinc, and 48 million tonnes (110 billion pounds; 48 billion kilograms) of copper. The district also produced byproduct bismuth, and iron-manganese ore.

== History ==
A map of the Colorado Mineral Belt

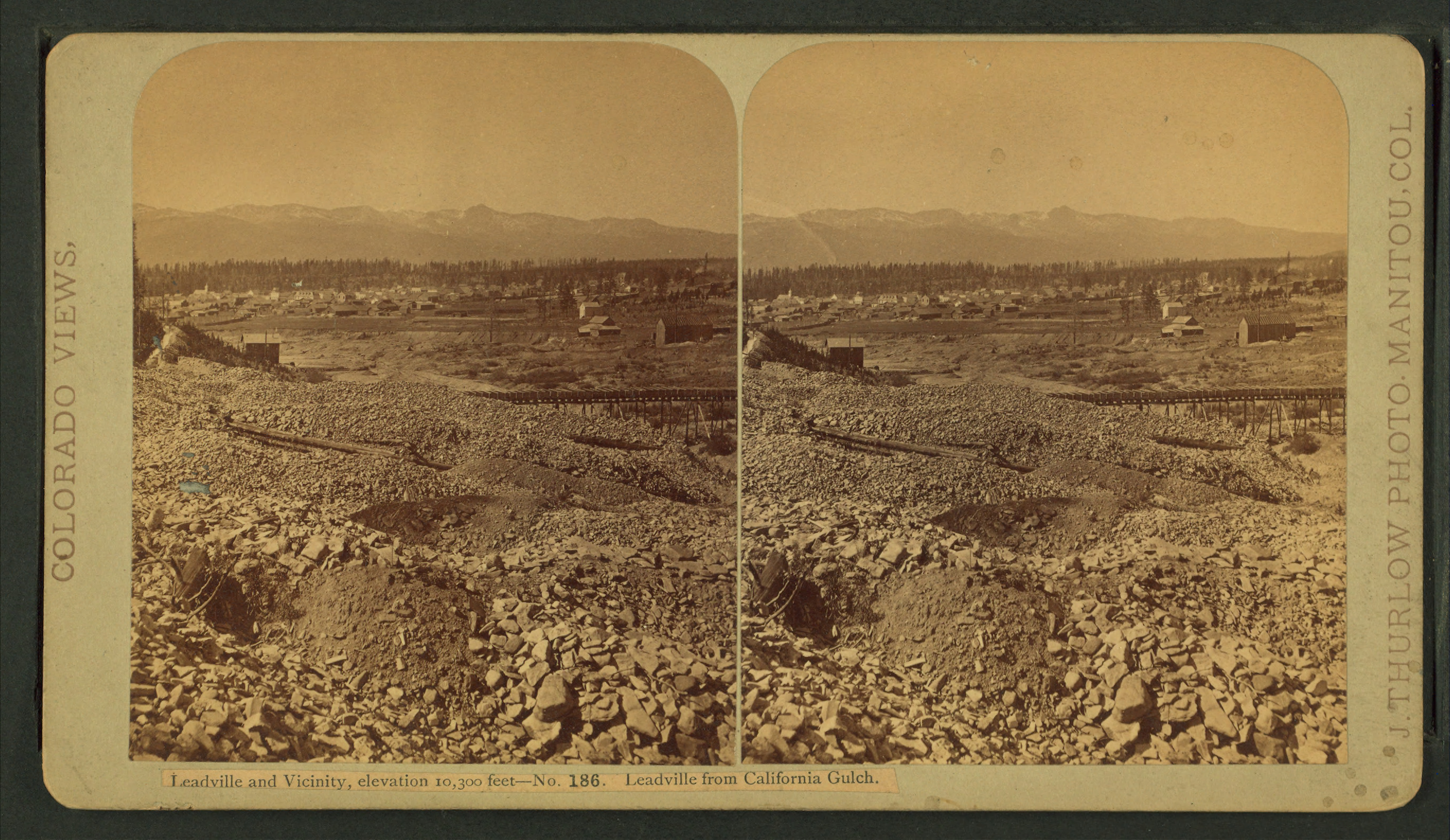
California Gulch with Leadville in the background

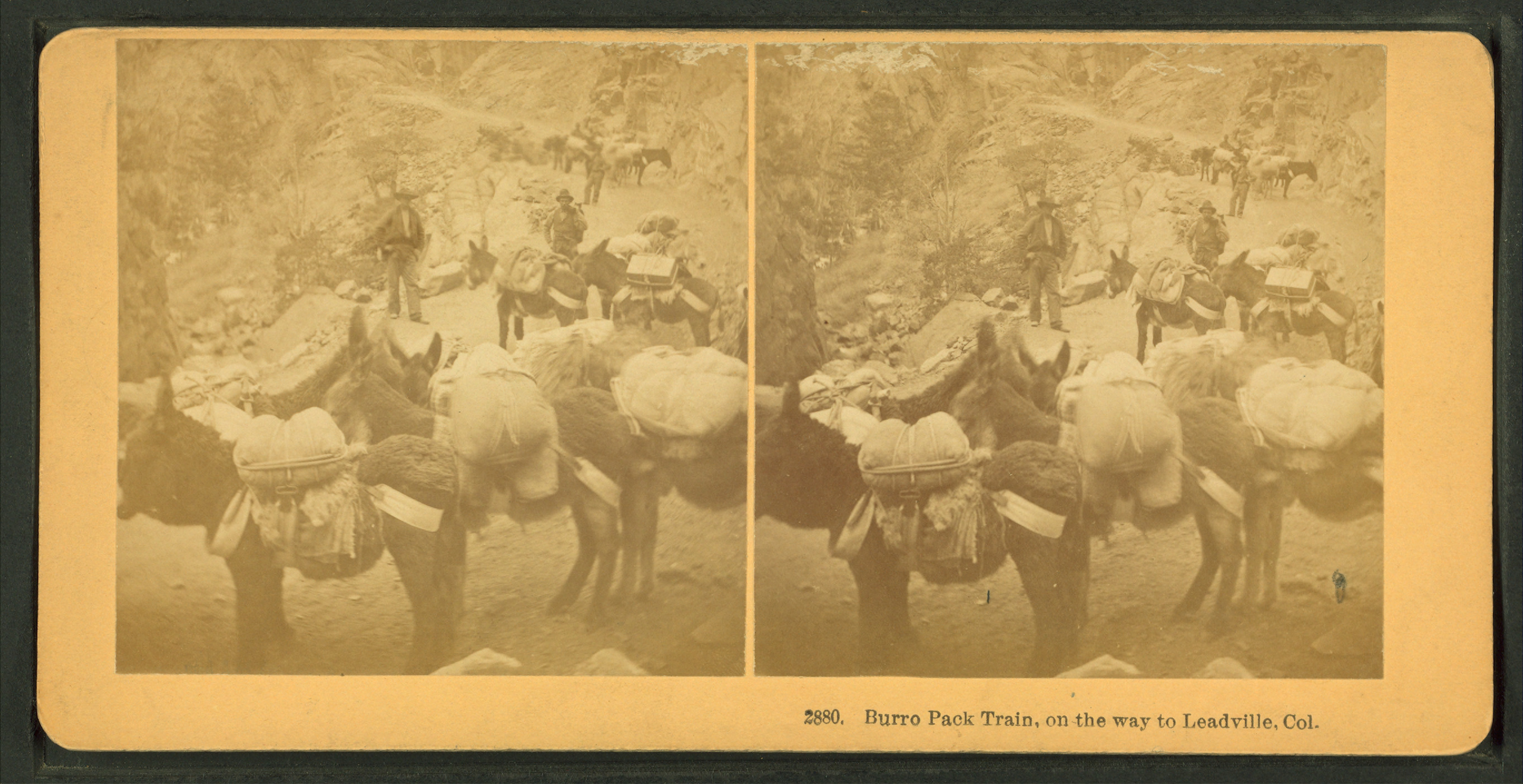
Burro pack train, on the way to Leadville

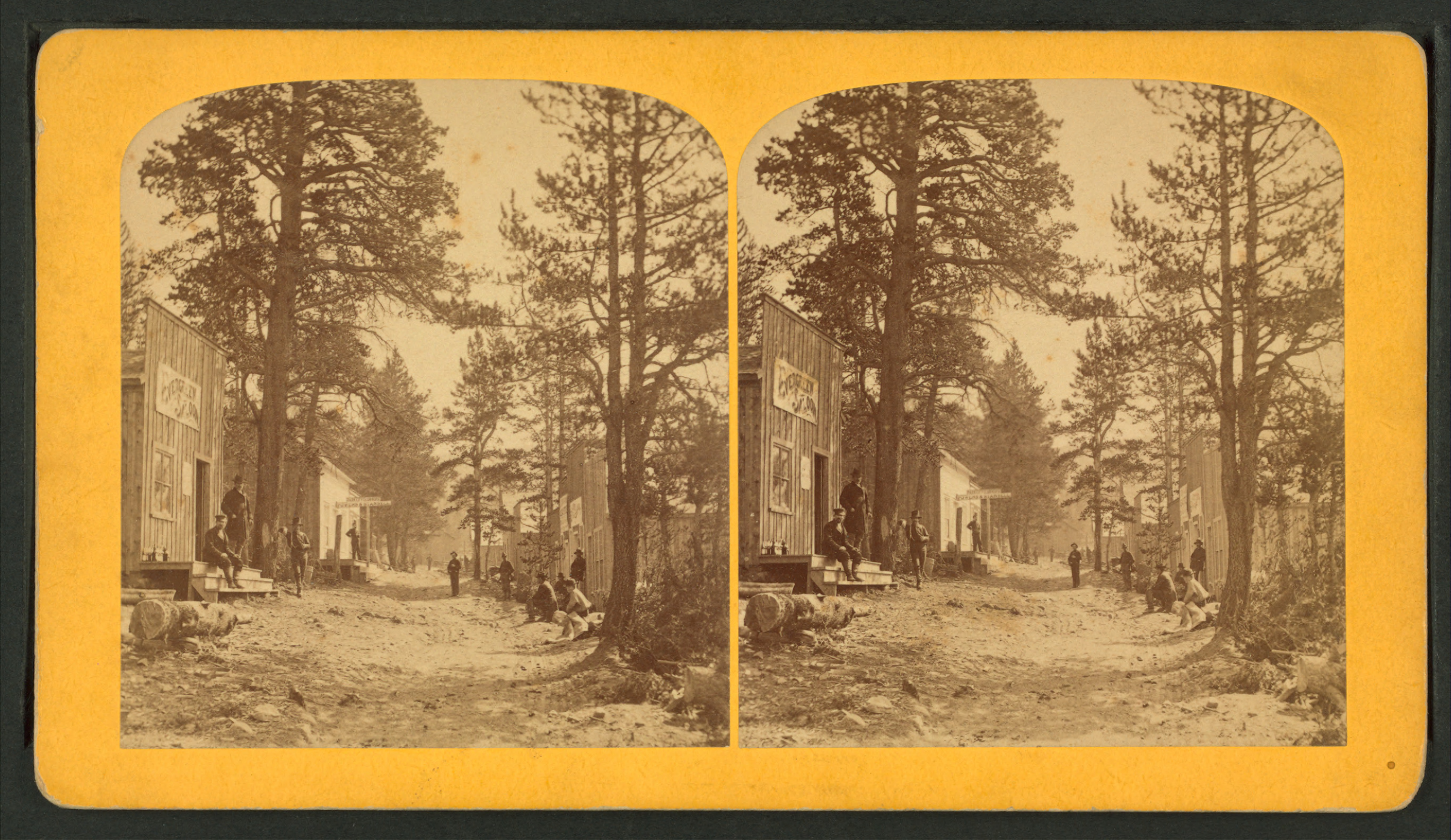
Park City. A new mining camp, up Stray Horse Gulch, two miles east of Leadville

Gold was discovered in the area in late 1859, during the Pike's Peak Gold Rush. However the initial discovery, where California Gulch empties into the Arkansas River, was not rich enough to cause excitement. On April 26, 1860, Abe Lee made a rich discovery of placer gold in California Gulch, about a mile east of Leadville, and Oro City was founded at the new diggings. By July 1860 the gold rush was on; the town and surrounding area grew to a population of 10,000 and an estimated $2 million in gold (equivalent to $70 million today) was taken out of California Gulch and nearby Iowa Gulch by the end of the first summer. But within a few years the richest part of the placers had been exhausted and the population of Oro City dwindled to only several hundred. Many claims were consolidated, and worked by ground sluicing. A ditch was dug in 1877 to provide water for hydraulic mining, but the hydraulic mining was reported to be unsuccessful.

In 1874, gold miners at Oro City had an assay done on the heavy, black sand that had been impedeing their placer gold recovery and found that it was the lead mineral cerussite, that carried a high content of silver. Prospectors traced the cerussite to its source, and by 1876 had discovered several lode silver-lead deposits, setting off the Colorado Silver Boom. Unlike the gold which was in placer deposits, the silver was in veins in bedrock and hard rock mining was needed for recovery of the ore.

The city of Leadville was founded near to the new silver deposits in 1877 by mine owners Horace Austin Warner Tabor and August Meyer, By 1878 Leadville had become the county seat of Lake county. The name Leadville probably was chosen for the town because lead was the major mineral in both the placers and in the lode mines. By 1880, millions of dollars were being made and Leadville became one of the world's largest silver camps with a population of over 40,000. Leadville became Colorado's largest mining camp and the town was second only to Denver. Leadville became overcrowded, unable to support the hundreds of miners that were flooding into the area. There was no local food source and all supplies had to come by either pack mules or the stage coach. Exorbitant prices were being charged for a place to sleep.

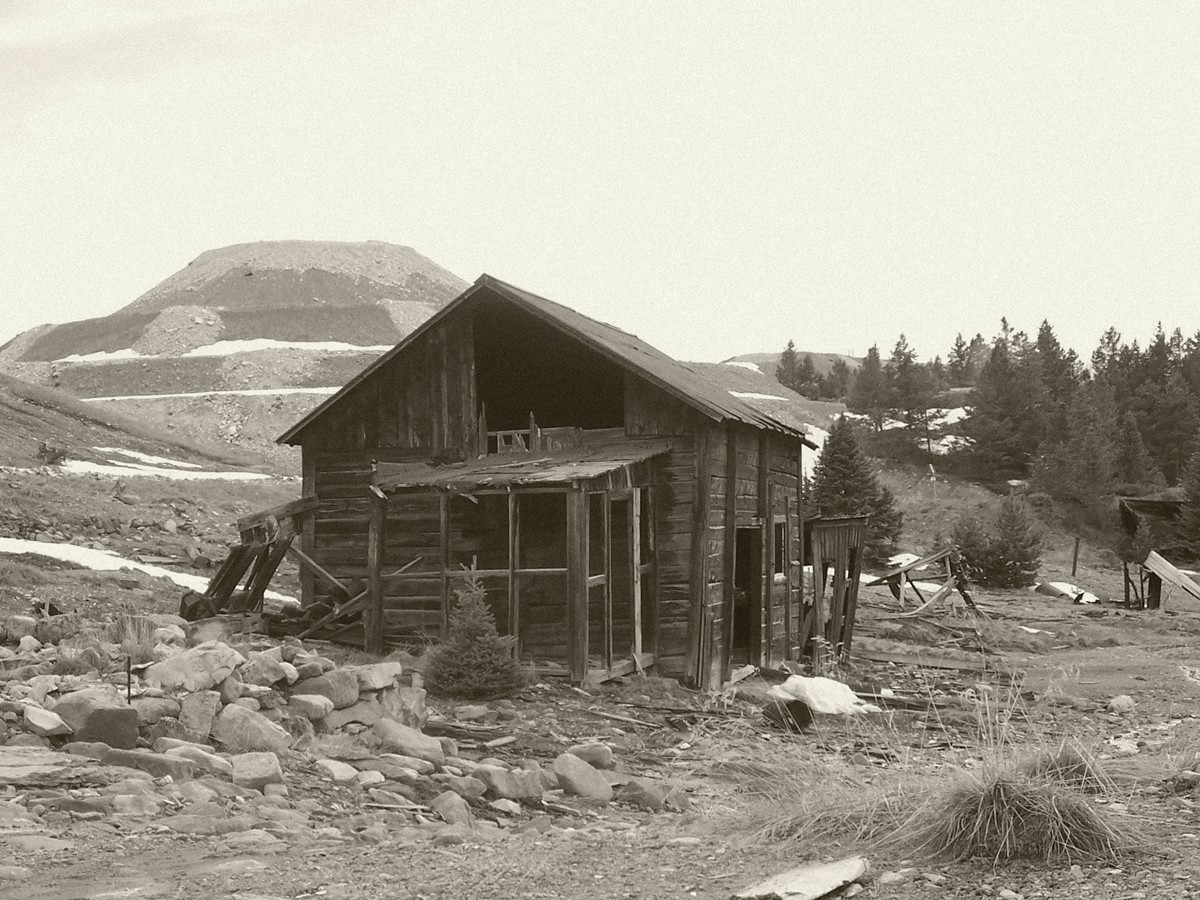
One of two remaining structures standing in Finntown in 2007, this old building was destroyed by vandals that year.

Leadville is a high mountain town and the winters are long and bitterly cold; many miners died of exposure and starvation. Crime was rampant and lawmen were unable to cope with it. Many small shanty towns grew up around Leadville, including Poverty Flats, Slabtown, Finntown, and Boughtown. The name "Boughtown" referred not only to the many pine trees that grew in the area, but to lodgings the miners built of four posts covered with pine boughs.

In 1893, the repeal of the Sherman Silver Purchase Act caused a panic in Leadville and in all of Colorado's silver camps. The price of silver fell rapidly and eventually many of the silver mines closed. Mining companies came to rely increasingly on income from the lead and zinc.

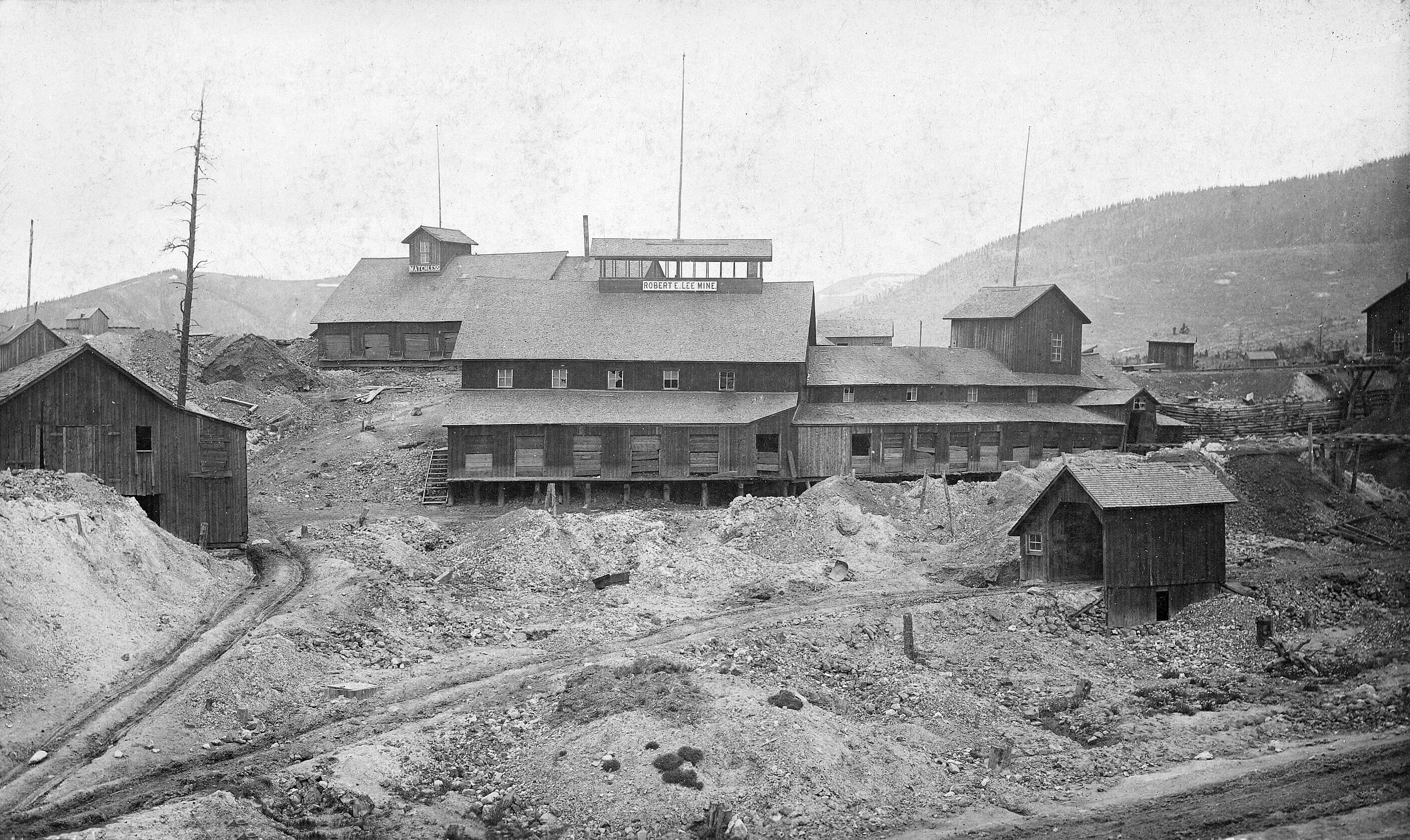
Robert E. Lee Mine, Leadville, Colorado - circa 1879/1894 - William Henry Jackson

The Sherman Mine produced over 10 million ounces (620,000 pounds; 280,000 kilograms) of silver, mostly between 1968 and 1982, with a value of over $300 million at 2010 prices. Secondary ore minerals from the Sherman mine are popular with mineral collectors.The prominent ruins of the historic buildings and structures of the Hilltop Mine (above the more recent Sherman mine workings) are often visited and photographed by hikers and mountaineers. After 100 years as a major US mining district, the last active mine, the Black Cloud mine, owned by ASARCO, closed in 1999. While there is no longer any active mining in the Leadville District, over the course of history more than 2800 patented mine claims were filed and the area contains over 1600 prospects, 1300 shafts, and 155 adits. The value of the cumulative production of silver alone from the Leadville mines is estimated to be $512 million through 1967 (equivalent to about $4.9 billion today).

== Geology ==
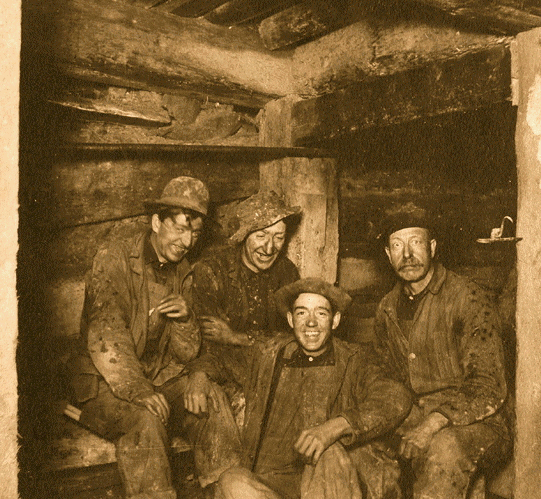
Hard rock miners at Garbutt Mine, east of Leadville c. 1900

Leadville lies near the center of the Colorado Mineral Belt (CMB), a 50-mile-wide (80 km) strip that runs north and south for 300 miles (480 km). Mineralization of the CMB came primarily by way of intrusions of Tertiary Period magmas. The primary ores of the CMB were generally deposited as mixed metal sulfide mineral veins containing pyrite, galena, sphalerite, chalcopyrite, and gold, silver, and copper. During the last glacial period native gold was freed from the host rock and became available for placer mining. The district is a highly faulted area, intruded with Tertiary quartz monzonite porphyries, on the east side of the Arkansas River graben, part of the Rio Grande Rift system.

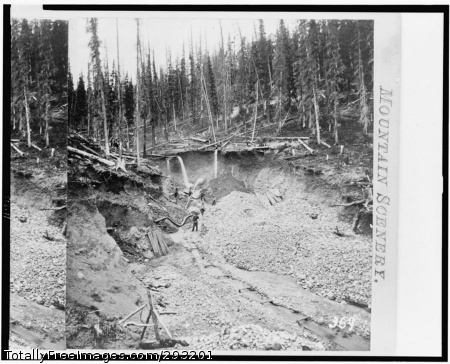
Hydraulic mining, California Gulch ~ 1879

The silver occurs associated with manganese and lead in veins, stockworks, and manto-type deposits in the Mississippian Leadville Limestone (here a dolomite), the Devonian Dyer Dolomite, and the Ordovician Manitou Dolomite. Ore minerals are pyrite, sphalerite, and galena, in jasperoid and manganosiderite gangue. In upper levels, the ore minerals are oxidized to cerussite, anglesite, and smithsonite. Leadville was the largest silver-producing district in Colorado. Cumulative production through 1963 was 240 million troy ounces (16 million pounds; 7.5 million kilograms) of silver, three million troy ounces (210 thousand pounds; 93 thousand kilograms) of gold, 987 million tonnes (2.2 trillion pounds; 987 billion kilograms) of lead, 712 million tonnes (1.6 trillion pounds; 712 billion kilograms) of zinc, and 48 million tonnes (110 billion pounds; 48 billion kilograms) of copper.

Geologist R. Mark Maslyn describes the Leadville mining district and the nearby Sherman Mine area saying:

Several mining districts surrounding the central Colorado Sawatch Range contain economic deposits hosted by late Mississippian paleokarst features. These are primarily developed in and along the upper surface of the early Mississippian Leadville Formation. Paleokarst features include isolated eaves and sinkholes as well as integrated cavern systems that are mineralized and can be traced from insurgence to outlet.

== Environmental damage related to mining operations ==
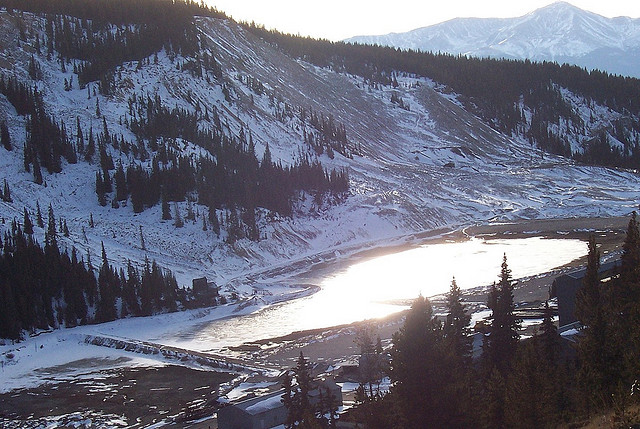
Black Cloud Mine tailings pond, 2008.

Mining, mineral processing and smelting activities in the area have produced gold, silver, lead and zinc for more than 130 years. Wastes generated during the mining and ore processing activities contained metals such as arsenic and lead at levels posing a threat to human health and the environment. These wastes remained on the land surface and migrated through the environment by washing into streams and leaching contaminants into surface water and groundwater. The site was added to the U.S. Environmental Protection Agency (EPA) National Priorities List in 1983,. Investigation of the site began in the mid-1980s. Since 1995, EPA and the potentially responsible parties have conducted removal and remedial activities to consolidate, contain and control more than 9,400,000 cubic feet (350,000 yd^{3}) of contaminated soils, sediments and mine-processing wastes. Cleanups by the potentially responsible parties have involved drainage controls to prevent acid mine runoff, consolidation and capping of mine piles, cleanup of residential properties and reuse of slag. As of September 2011, most of the cleanup had been completed so current risk of exposure is low, although pregnant women, nursing mothers and young children are still encouraged to have their blood-lead levels checked.

=== Drainage tunnels ===
As in many mining districts, as the mines extended deeper, keeping the water pumped out of the workings became a major expense. To more economically drain the mines, two tunnels were driven to allow the water to drain by gravity. Water from both tunnels ultimately flows into the Arkansas River.

==== Yak tunnel ====
The Yak tunnel, 3.5 miles (5.6 km) long and built between 1895 and 1923 to drain the southern part of the district, has its outlet in California Gulch east of the town of Leadville. The tunnel became part of the California Gulch Superfund site in 1983. In October 1985, a large surge of water from the Yak tunnel reached the Arkansas River, and elevated the dissolved metals content of the river for tens of miles downstream. Water flowing from the tunnel has been treated by its owner, ASARCO, since June 1991, to remove metals.

==== Leadville tunnel ====
The Leadville tunnel was started in 1943 by the US Bureau of Mines to drain the mines of the northern part of the district, and so increase metal production. The tunnel has its outlet north of the town of Leadville, on the East Fork of the Arkansas River. In 1959 the US Bureau of Reclamation bought the tunnel for $1.00, as a source of irrigation water.

Since March 1992, the Bureau of Reclamation has treated the water flowing out of the tunnel, to remove dissolved metals and bring the water quality into compliance with the Clean Water Act.

Collapses within the tunnel that began in 1995 partially blocked flow, and have created a large reservoir of an estimated one billion US gallons (3.8 billion litres; 830 million imperial gallons) of water within the tunnel behind the collapse. In February 2008, concerns became public that if the collapse dam should suddenly fail, as has happened in other mine drainage tunnels in Colorado (such as the Yak tunnel, the Argo Tunnel and the 2015 Gold King Mine waste water spill north of Silverton, Colorado), a large slug of contaminated water would suddenly flow out of the tunnel, overwhelm the treatment facilities, and flow into the Arkansas River. The rise in water level inside the tunnel has caused water with high concentrations of dissolved metals to leak out to the ground surface through springs.

Opinions as to the threat posed varied widely. County Commissioner Mike Hickman said "If it blows, it could be a national catastrophe, not only to Leadville and Lake County but to the entire Arkansas River." On the other hand, Leadville Mayor Bud Elliott stated "This is what happens when you create an emergency when there isn't one." On June 30, 2008, the Bureau of Reclamation issued a report that concluded that a sudden burst of water from the tunnel was unlikely, and that the tunnel posed "no imminent public safety hazard."

On 27 February 2008, the US EPA began pumping 150 US gallons (570 L; 120 imp gal) per minute from the tunnel system, to relieve water pressure upstream from the blockage. The water, pumped from the Gaw mine shaft, was clean enough to discharge to the Arkansas River without treatment. Meanwhile, the EPA drilled a new well into the tunnel system; a pump test was completed in early June 2008 to determine optimal pumping rate.

== Tour and visitor attractions ==
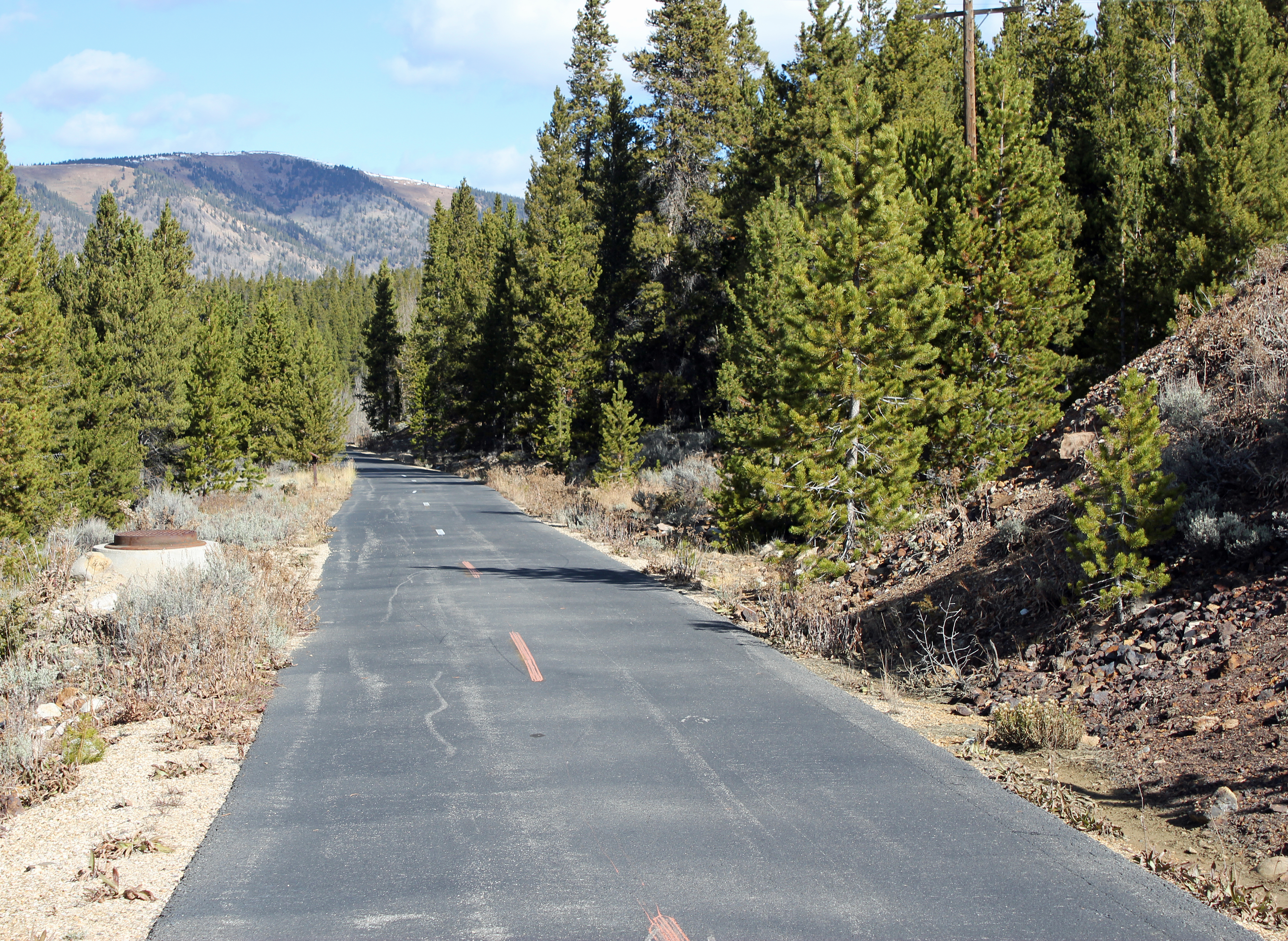
Mineral Belt National Recreation Trail

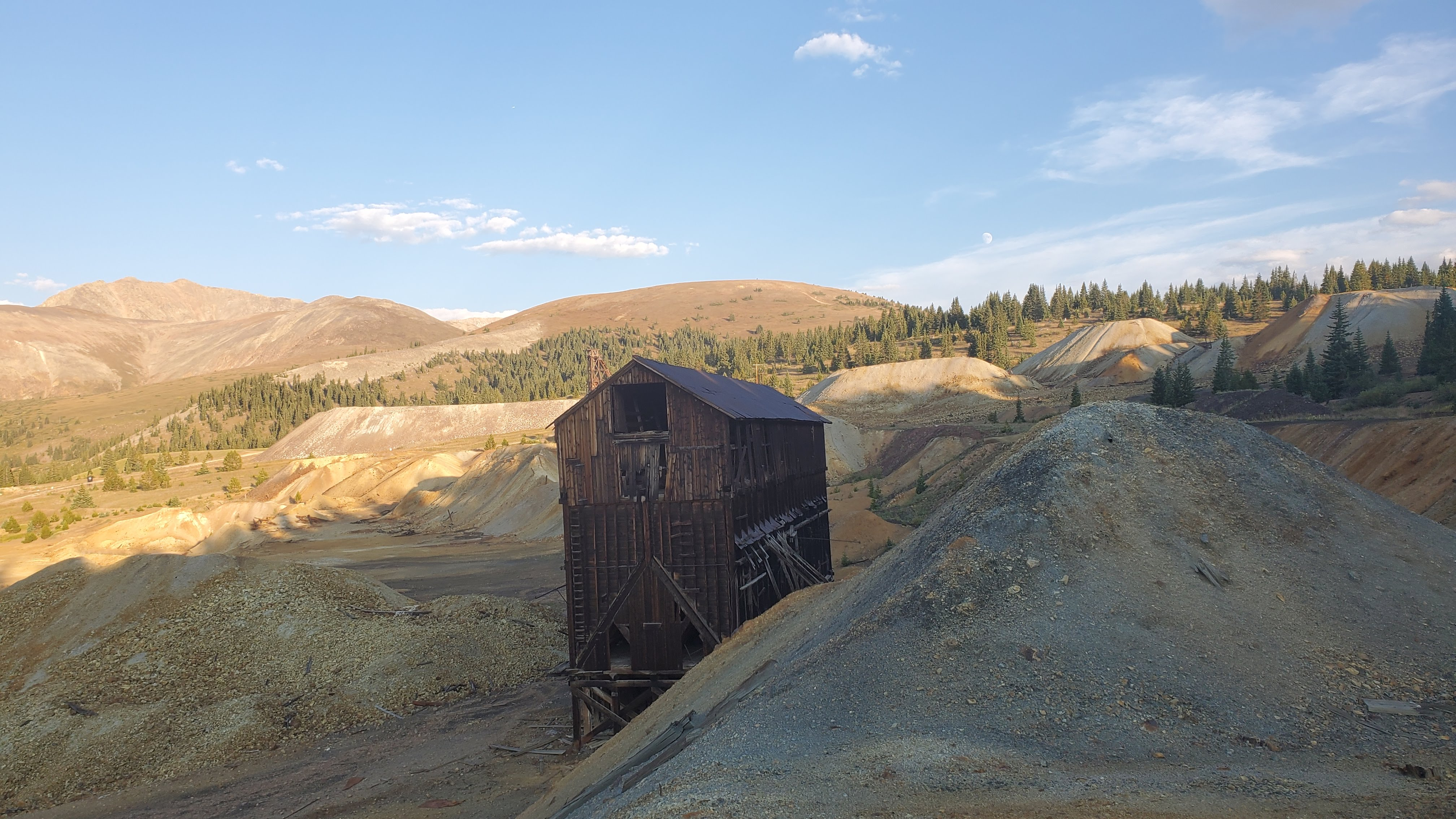
The abandoned Ibex Mine near Stumptown

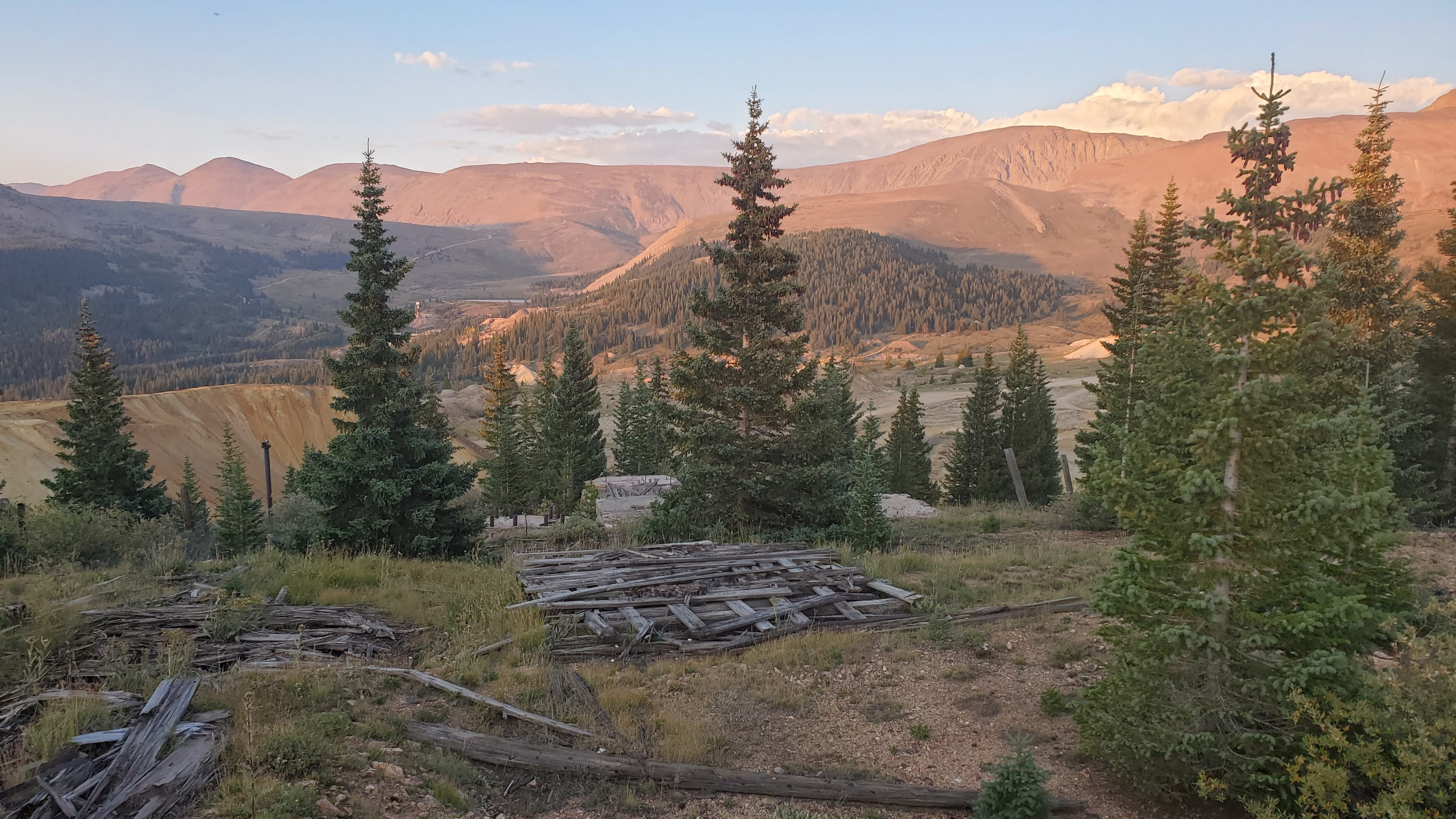
Collapsed remains of part of the Ibex Mine

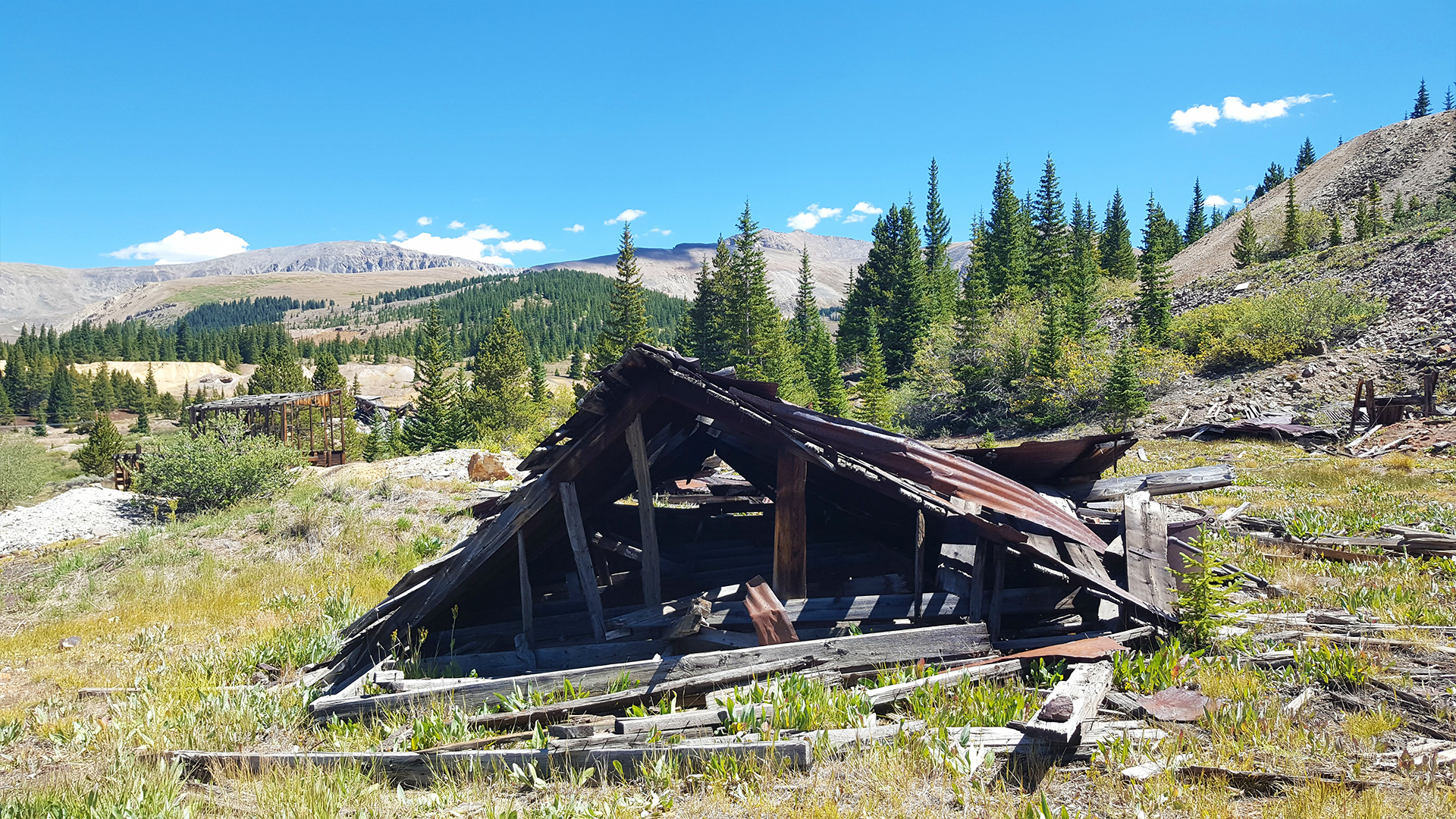
Remains of a collapsed mining structure in the district

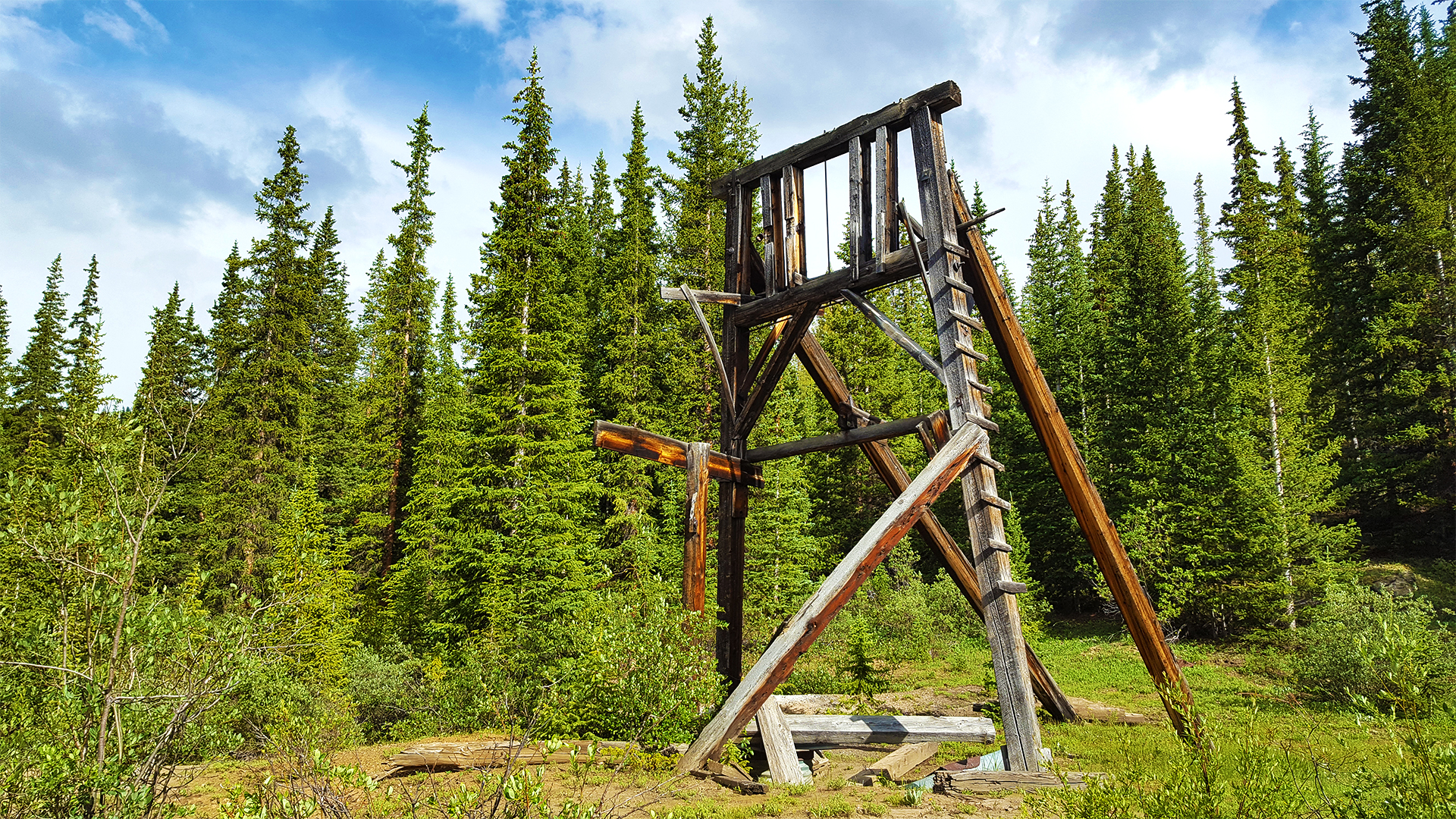
An abandoned mine's headframe in the District

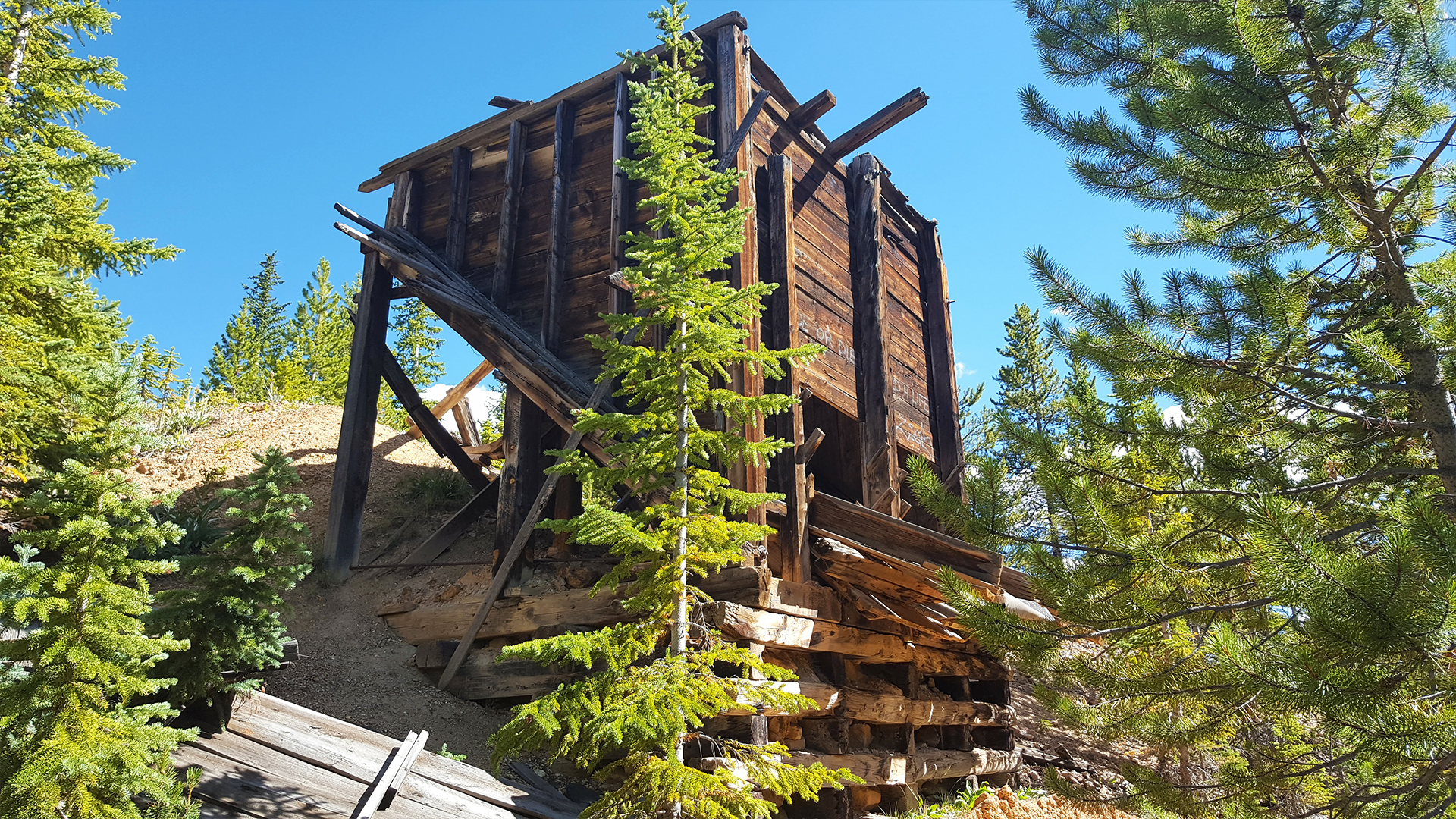
A mine's ore chute in the district

The Mineral Belt National Recreation Trail is an 11.6-mile (18.7 km) all-season biking/walking trail that loops around Leadville and through its historic mining district. In part the trail follows old mining-camp railbeds. Several signs along the way provide historical snippets about Leadville's colorful past.

The "Route of the Silver Kings" is a driving tour of the 20-square-mile (52 km^{2}) historic mining district surrounding Leadville. The tour includes mines, power plants, ghost towns and mining camps.

The National Mining Hall of Fame and Museum occupies 71,000 square feet (6,600 m^{2}). Major exhibits include an elaborate model railroad, a walk-through replica of an underground hardrock mine, the Gold Rush room, with many specimens of native gold, a large collection of mineral specimens, and a mining art gallery.

The Matchless mine and cabin, former home of Baby Doe Tabor, is open as a tourist attraction during the summer.

== See also ==
- Colorado Silver Boom
- Leadville, Colorado
- Silver mining in Colorado
- Yule marble

== Gallery of Leadville area minerals ==
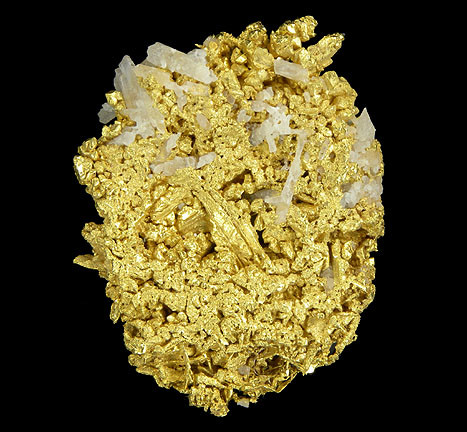
Gold-quartz

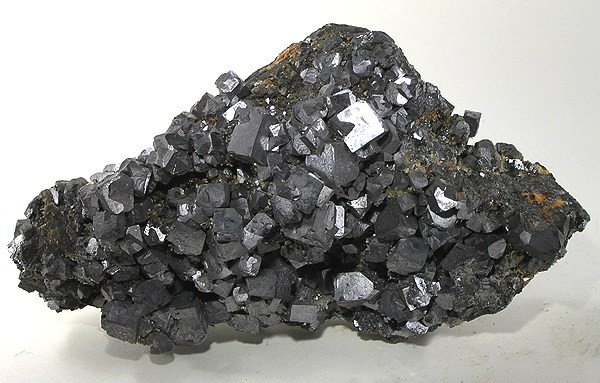
Galena—Black Cloud Mine

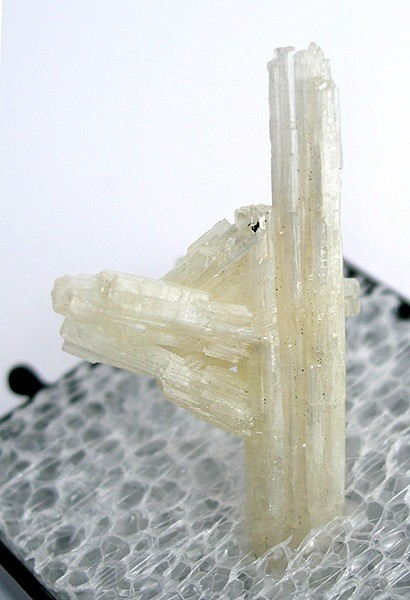
Cerussite

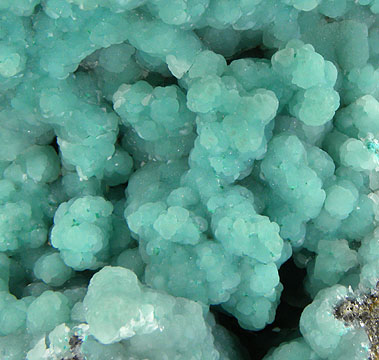
Smithsonite-baryte

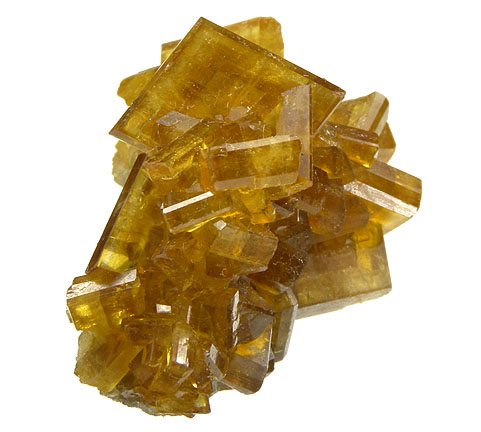
Baryte

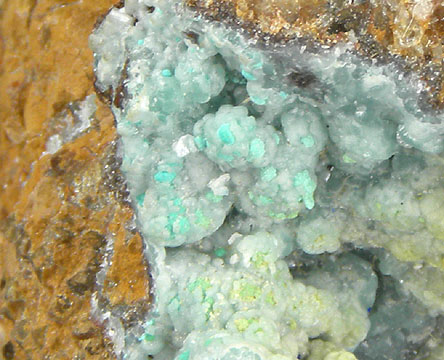
Cerussite-rosasite-azurite

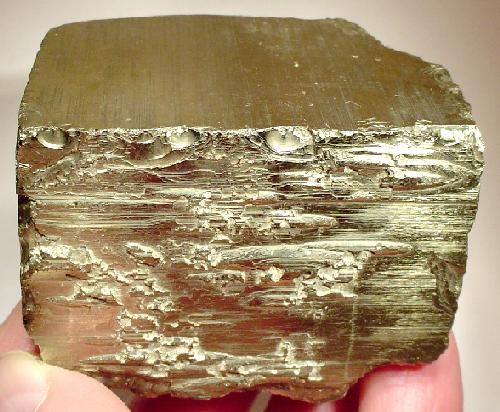
Pyrite

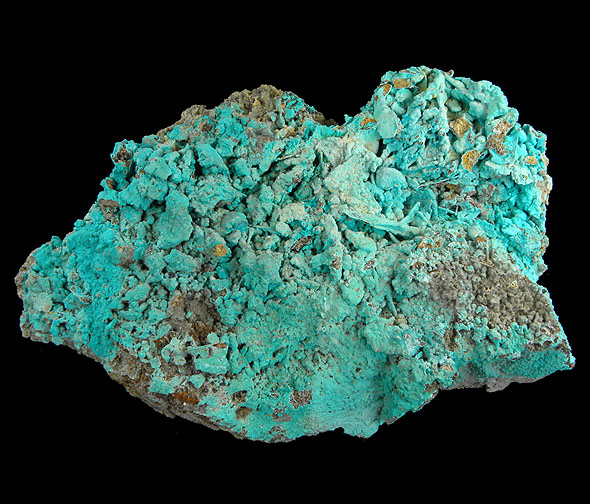
Wulfenite-rosasite

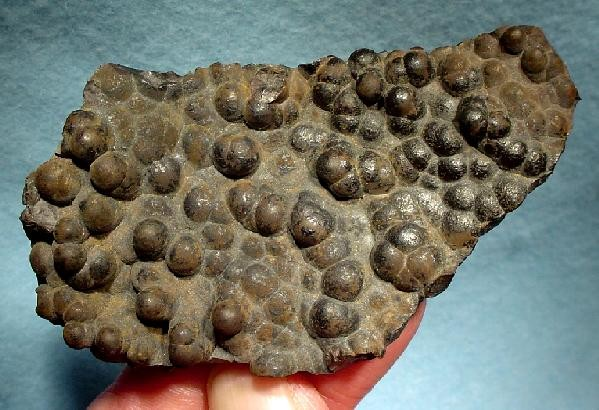
Goethite

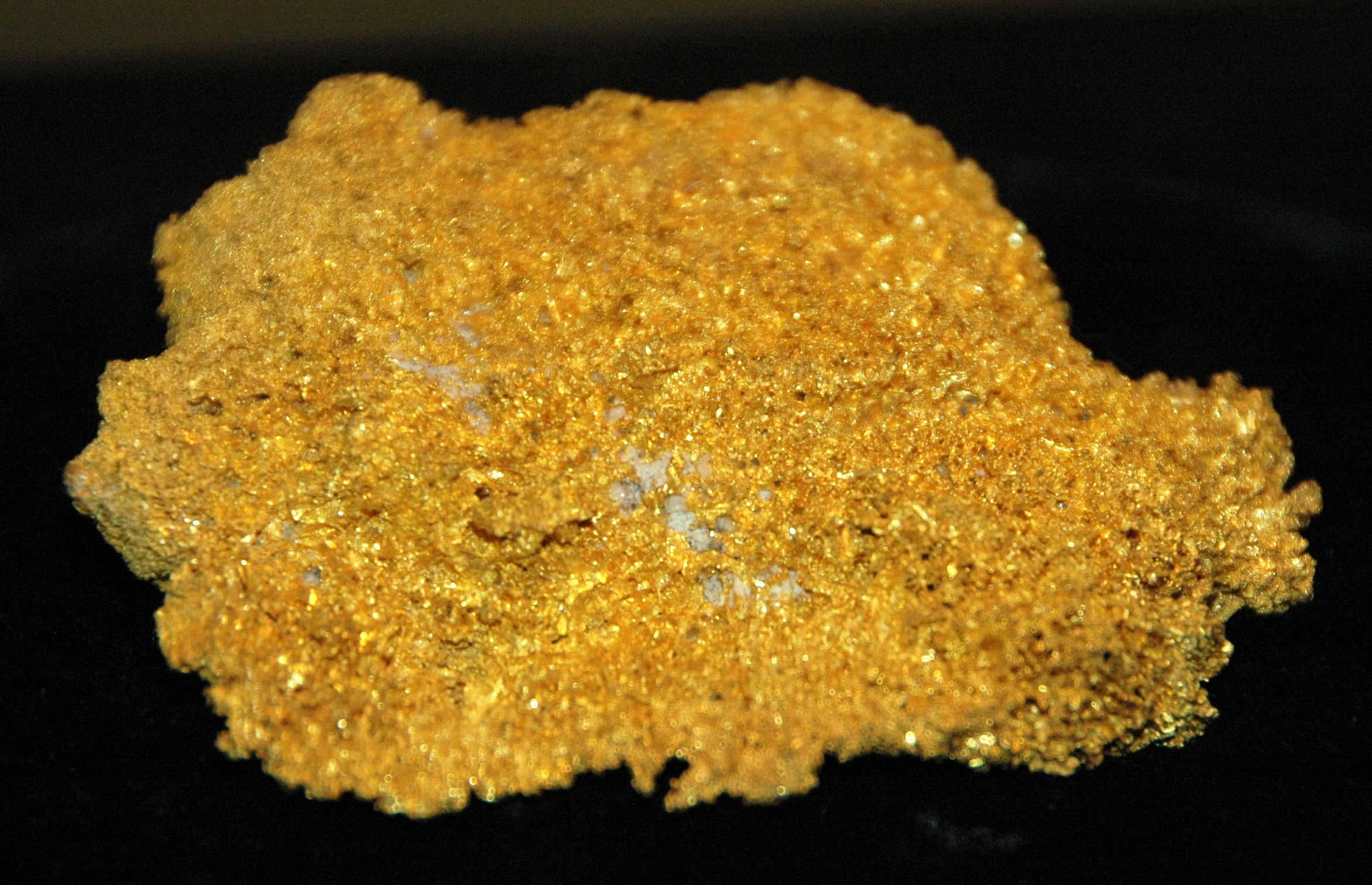
Gold - Little Jonny Mine
