= Mount Champion =

Mountain in Colorado, United States

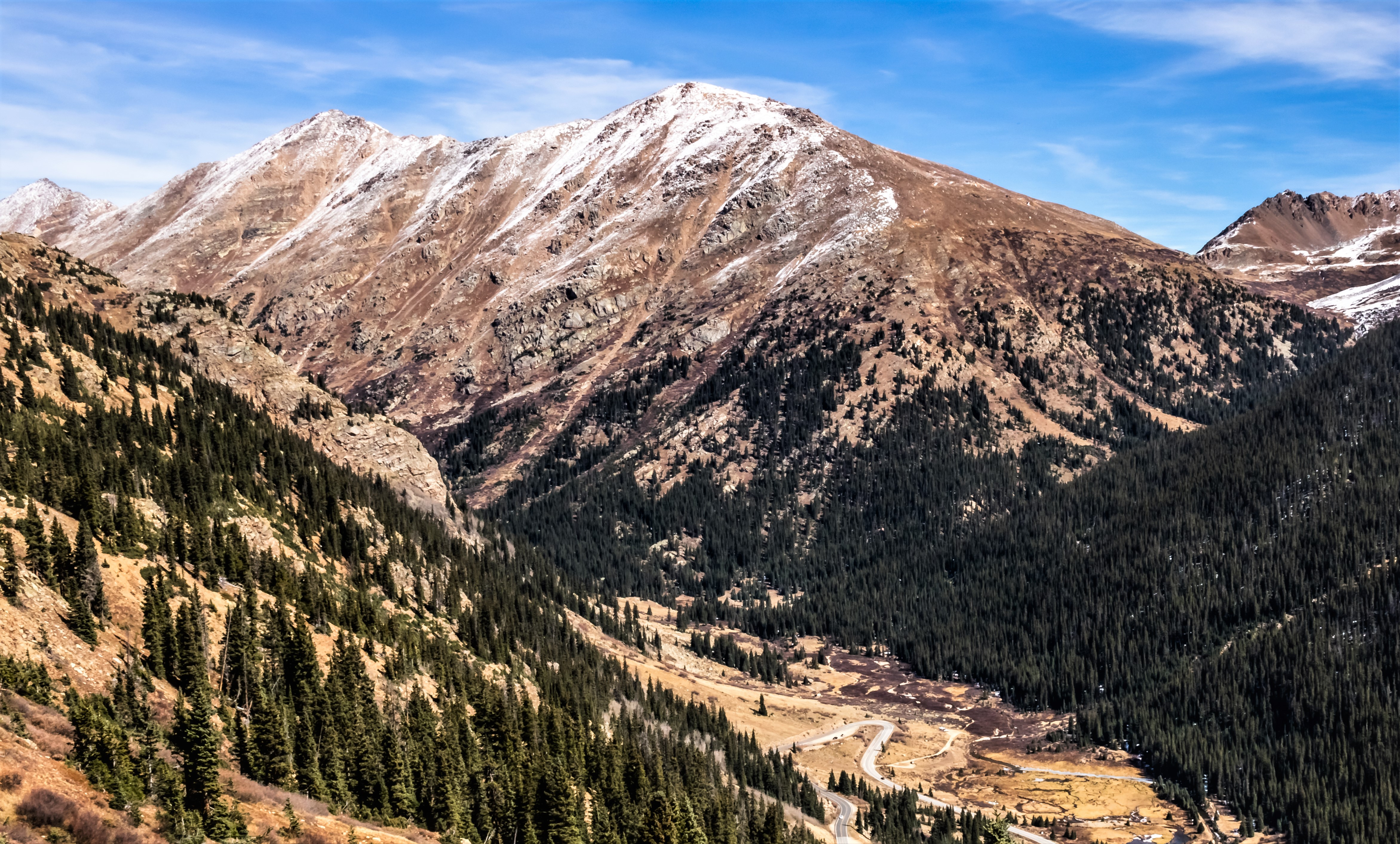
- Southwest aspect, center

Highest point
- Elevation: 13,646 ft (4,159 m)
- Prominence: 286 ft (87 m)
- Parent peak: Peak 13738
- Isolation: 0.6 mi (0.97 km)
- Coordinates: 39°07′56″N 106°31′17″W

Geography
- Location within Colorado Location within the United States
- Country: United States
- State: Colorado
- County: Lake County
- Protected area: San Isabel National Forest
- Parent range: Rocky Mountains; Sawatch Range
- Topo map: USGS Mount Champion

Geology
- Rock type: Quartz Monzonite

Climbing
- Easiest route: class 2 hiking

Mount Champion is a 13,646-foot (4,159 m) mountain summit in Lake County, Colorado, United States.

== Description ==
Mount Champion is set 2 miles (3.2 km) east of the Continental Divide in the Sawatch Range which is a subrange of the Rocky Mountains. The mountain is located 17 miles (27 km) east of the community of Aspen on land managed by San Isabel National Forest. Mount Champion can be seen from State Highway 82 at Independence Pass. It ranks as the 173rd-highest peak in Colorado. Precipitation runoff from the mountain's slopes drains into tributaries of the Arkansas River. Topographic relief is significant as the summit rises 2,450 feet (747 m) above North Fork Lake Creek in 0.75 miles (1.21 km). An ascent of the peak involves hiking six miles (9.7 km) with 3,400 feet (1,036 m) of elevation gain.

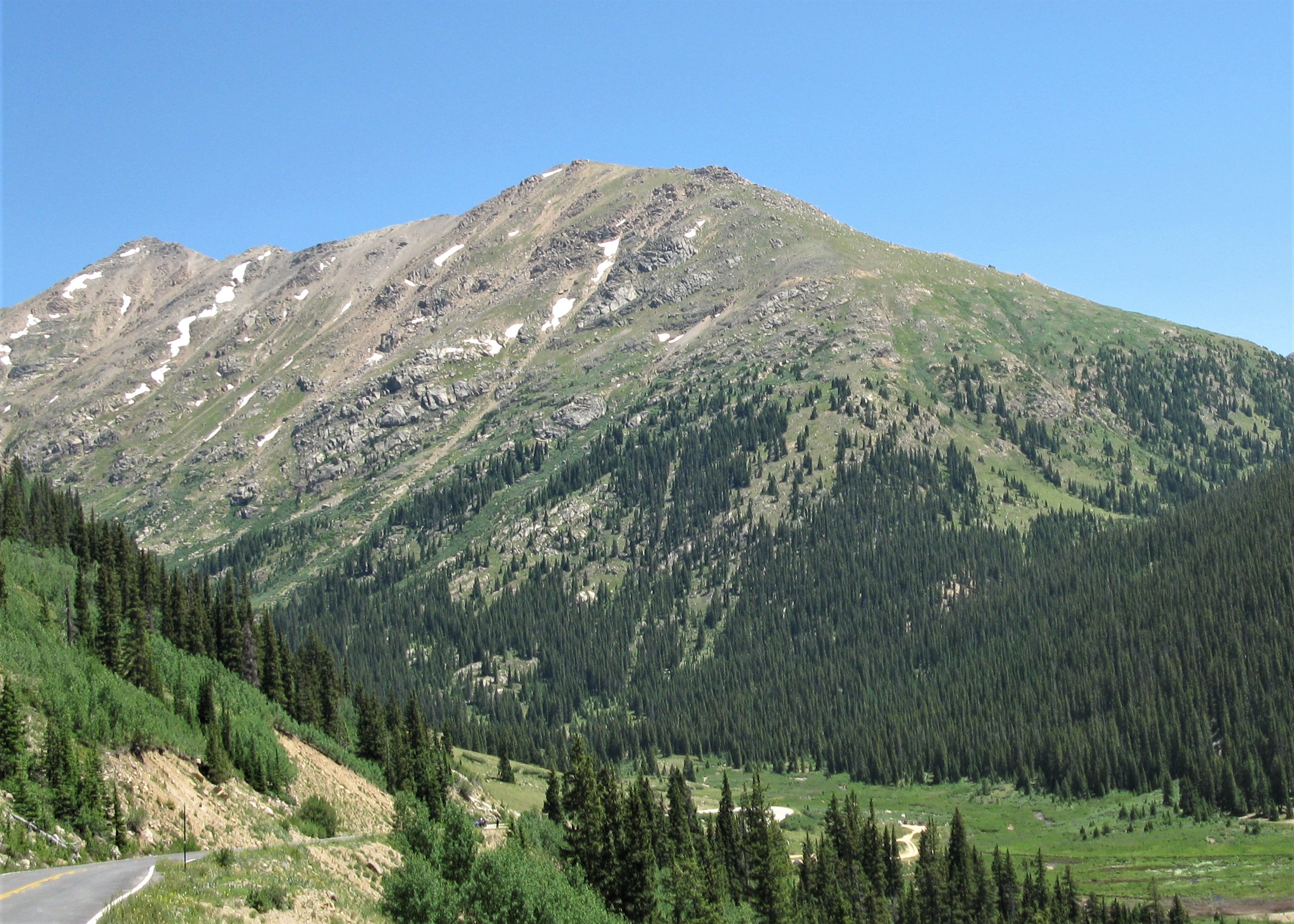
Mt. Champion in summer from Highway 82

== History ==
Tingley S. Wood discovered gold on Mount Champion in 1881. The Champion Mine extracted gold and silver-bearing quartz and an aerial tramway transported the ore from the mine to the Champion Mill. The crushed ore was then transported by wagon to Leadville. The mountain's toponym has been officially adopted by the United States Board on Geographic Names, and has been featured in publications since at least 1898. The mine and summit are privately held land, owned by Gold Retrievers, LLC.

== Climate ==
According to the Köppen climate classification system, Mt. Champion is located in an alpine subarctic climate zone with cold, snowy winters, and cool to warm summers. Due to its altitude, it receives precipitation all year, as snow in winter, and as thunderstorms in summer, with a dry period in late spring.

== See also ==
- List of mountain peaks of Colorado
- Thirteener
