= Colorado Mineral Belt =

Area of ore deposits in Colorado, United States

- Ore deposit
- Approximate boundaries of the Colorado Mineral Belt with inner area having principal mining districts.
- Location: Colorado
- Orogeny: Laramide

The Colorado Mineral Belt (CMB) is an area of ore deposits from the La Plata Mountains in Southwestern Colorado to near the middle of the state at Boulder, Colorado, and from which over 25 million troy ounces (778 t) of gold were extracted beginning in 1858. The belt is a "northeast-striking zone defined by: a Proterozoic shear zone system (McCoy, 2001); a suite of Laramide-aged plutons and related ore deposits (Tweto and Sims, 1963); a major gravity low (Isaacson and Smithson, 1976); low-crustal velocities; and high heat flow (Decker et al., 1988)." Mining districts include:

- Central City-Idaho Springs district
- Leadville mining district, named for Leadville, Colorado
- Sneffels-Red Mountain-Telluride district

The belt lies within a zone that has been geologically active at intervals beginning from near the time of crustal accretion in central Colorado at least 1.6 billion years ago until the present. Parts of the CMB follow shear zones of Precambrian age and the Paleozoic and Mesozoic. Igneous rocks intruded about 60 to 70 million years ago during the Laramide orogeny are associated with the belt and once were thought to be responsible for most of the ore deposits. Now many of the important ore deposits are thought to be genetically related to younger magmatism, some at least as young as about 25 million years.

== See also ==
- Timeline of mining in Colorado
- Colorado Western Slope
- Cripple Creek Gold Rush
- Colorado Springs metropolitan area
