= Champion Mill =

Coordinates: 39°08′15″N 106°30′16″W

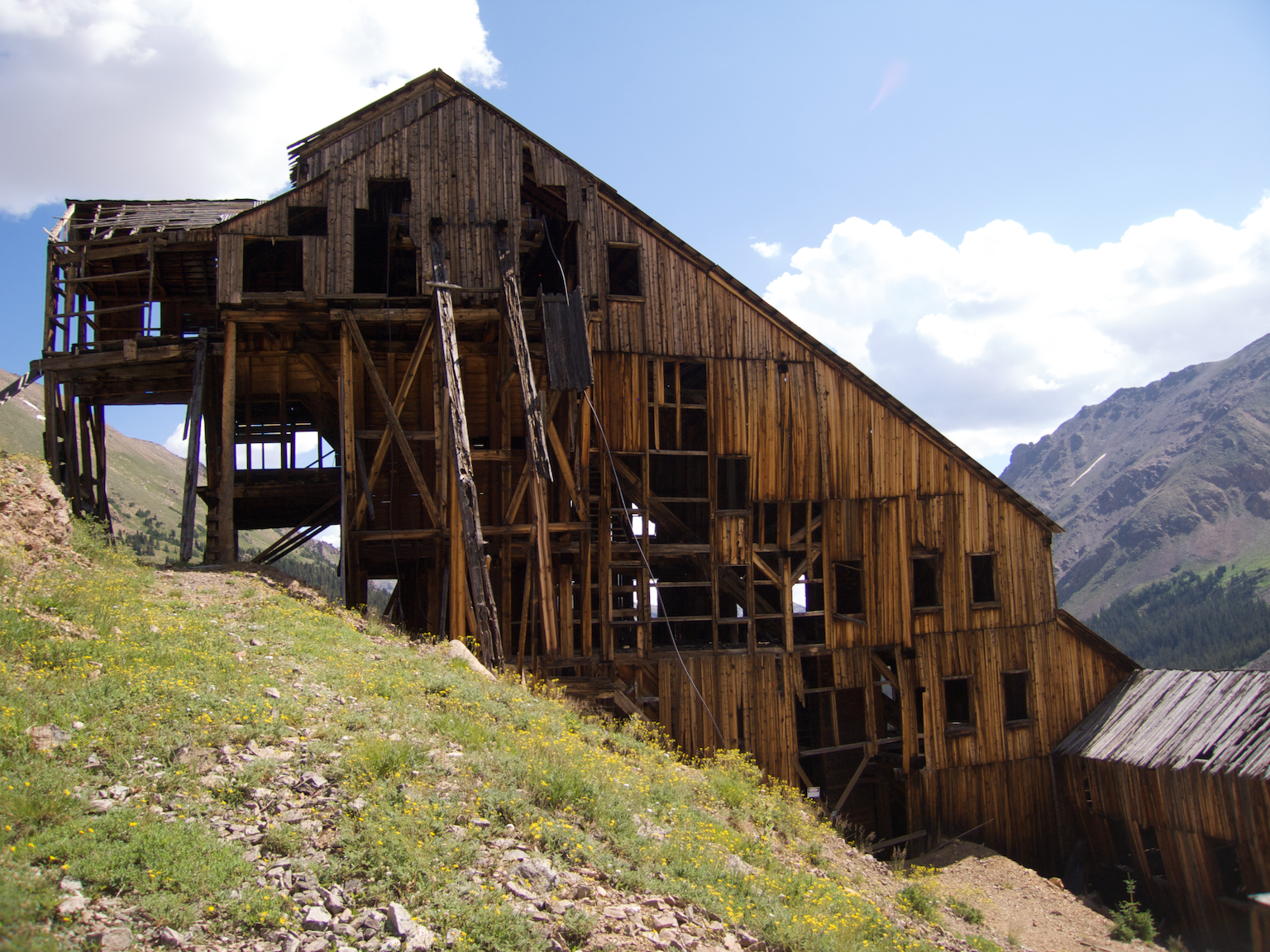
Champion Mill, Lake County, Colorado

Champion Mill, in Lake County, Colorado, is part of a mining complex on the eastern slope of Mount Champion on Halfmoon Creek. Established in the 1890s, it was a consistent supplier of gold and silver, as well as galena and pyrite to the smelters in Leadville, Colorado. The mine and mill operated until around 1919, when the price to ship the ore to Leadville became too expensive to maintain a profit. It was briefly reopened between 1937 and 1940, when it finally shut down for good. During its lifespan, the mine produced than 100,000 thousand pounds of minerals.

Today numerous structures remains, including the giant mill, which is gated off, numerous tram towers leading up the mountainside to the mine, and a couple small structures at the top of the mountain.
