= Silver mining in Colorado =

Silver mining in Colorado has taken place since the 1860s. In the past, Colorado called itself the Silver State. (Nevada also calls itself the Silver State. Idaho, however, actually produces the most silver in the US.)

Silver-mining centers in Colorado

== Central City-Idaho Springs district ==
Silver veins were discovered in the Central City-Idaho Springs district a short time after gold was discovered there in 1859. However, mining the silver veins was delayed for the most part until smelters were built in the late 1860s. The veins of the district are zoned in a roughly concentric manner, with gold-bearing pyrite veins in the center, and silver-bearing galena veins more common in the outlying areas.

== Montezuma district ==
The first silver discovery in Colorado was one mile (1.6 km) south of Montezuma in 1864. The discovery led to others in the Montezuma district, including those at Saints John.

== Argentine district ==
The discovery of silver in the Montezuma district led to the silver discovery at the Belmont lode in the Argentine district just northeast of the Montezuma district.

== Georgetown-Silver Plume district ==
Prospectors found gold veins near present Georgetown in 1859. Silver, the main product from the district, was not discovered until 1864. John Henry Bowman (1850–1900) came to Silver Plume, Colorado, in 1883, then moved to Georgetown, Colorado, in 1885. A machinist, he worked as foreman of the Miners Sampling Works. Later, he was superintendent of the American Sisters Mine, a company in which he owned stock. American Sisters Mine was a consolidation of Two Sisters Mine and Native American Mine, silver mines located on Columbia Mountain in upper Clear Creek County, Colorado. In 1891–1892, John Bowman and his wife Lavinia Potts Bowman (1848–1901) built what later became known as the Bowman/White House in Georgetown (a historical site today). There they raised two daughters, Iorria and Mary Ellen ("Mellie"). In 1899, Iorria married J.E. Carnal and moved to Ohio.

For the most part, Mellie (1876–1969) stayed in the family home after she married John James ("J.J.") White (1870–1932) in 1901. She inherited half of her father's share in the American Sisters Mine and served on the Georgetown Library Association from 1911 to 1922.

Mellie's husband, John James White Sr., bought the remaining stock of what was now called the Two American Sisters Mine. He managed the construction of a dam and power plant north of Georgetown and built a new shaft house and mill at the mine site. White, an attorney, practiced law, served as the Police Judge and Mayor of Georgetown from 1900 to 1902, and was President of the Georgetown school board. The Bowman-White House still remains and is registered as a historical site in Georgetown, Colorado.

== Leadville district ==
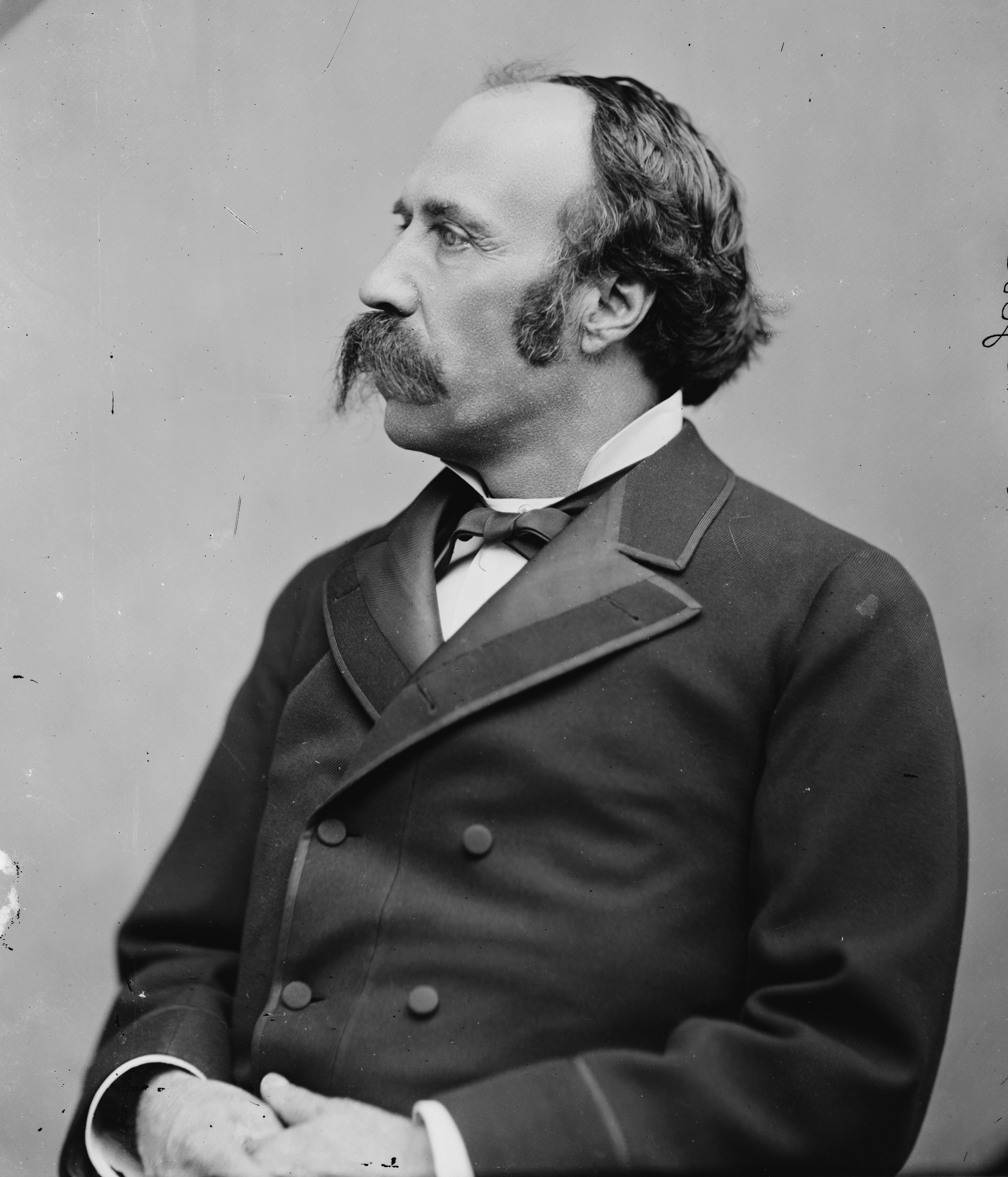
Shopkeeper Horace Tabor grubstaked a pair of prospectors, and their silver discovery at Leadville turned him into a millionaire

Despite the early silver discoveries, Colorado's largest silver district, Leadville, was not discovered until 1874. Leadville was the largest silver-producing district in Colorado. Cumulative production through 1963 was 240 million troy ounces (16 million pounds; 7.5 million kilograms) of silver, three million troy ounces (210 thousand pounds; 93 thousand kilograms) of gold, 987 million tonnes (2.2 trillion pounds; 987 billion kilograms) of lead, 712 million tonnes (1.6 trillion pounds; 712 billion kilograms) of zinc, and 48 million tonnes (110 billion pounds; 48 billion kilograms) of copper.

== Aspen district ==
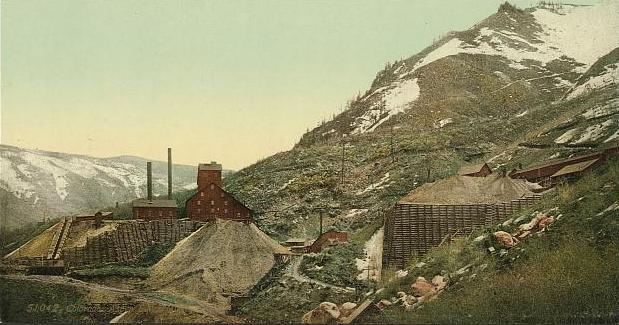
Silver mines at Aspen, circa 1898–1905.

In 1879, prospectors searching for another Leadville were led to the Aspen area by geological maps that showed outcrops of Leadville Limestone. They found silver ore on Aspen Mountain, but ore production was small until the Denver and Rio Grande Railroad reached the town in 1887 and provided economic shipment of ore to smelters. Ore occurs in the Mississippian Leadville Limestone and the lower part of the overlying Pennsylvanian Belden Formation. Ore minerals include galena, sphalerite, and native silver. Early production was almost all silver, but after 1900, lead and zinc became economically important. Major mining operations continued until 1952. Total production was 101 million troy ounces of silver, 294 tons of lead, and 11,000 tons of zinc.

== Gilman district ==
Silver was discovered in the Gilman mining district in 1878 or 1879. As the deeper sulfide ores were reached, the miners found that the ore contained so much zinc that the smelters refused to buy it. A roaster and magnetic separator were installed in 1905 to separate out the zinc minerals, turning the problem into an asset. The mining operations transitioned increasingly to zinc, although the Eagle Mine was still the leading producer of silver in the state in 1930. The New Jersey Zinc Company entered Gilman in 1912, and over a period of years purchased all the principal mines and the entire townsite. Zinc was the economic mainstay until 1931, when low zinc prices forced the company to switch to mining copper-silver ores. Production of the district through 1964 was 64 million troy ounces (1,990 metric tons) of silver, 348,000 ounces (10.82 metric tons) of gold, 578,000 metric tons of zinc, 114,000 metric tons of lead, and 92,000 metric tons of copper. Zinc production resumed in 1941 and remained the principal product of the mines until they were closed in the 1980s.

== Creede district ==
The Creede district in Mineral County was discovered in 1887 but did not become a significant silver producer until 1891. The ore occurs as veins along north–south trending faults, and as replacement bodies in the Creede Formation, a Tertiary ash-flow tuff. Ore minerals are sphalerite, galena, acanthite, native silver, pyrite, and chalcopyrite. Production through 1983 totaled 80 million troy ounces (2,500 metric tons) of silver, 150 thousand troy ounces (4.7 metric tons) of gold, and considerable lead and zinc.

== Current production ==
The largest current source of silver in Colorado is as a byproduct of gold mining at the Cripple Creek & Victor Gold Mine, a large open-pit heap leach operation owned by Newmont Mining Corporation at Victor, Colorado (see Cripple Creek mining district). In 2006, the mine produced 4.0 metric tons (130,000 troy ounces) of silver.

== See also ==
- Champion Mill
- Coal mining in Colorado
- Gold mining in Colorado
- Silver mining
- Silver mining in the United States
- Uranium mining in Colorado
