= Oro City, Colorado =

Ghost town in Colorado, US

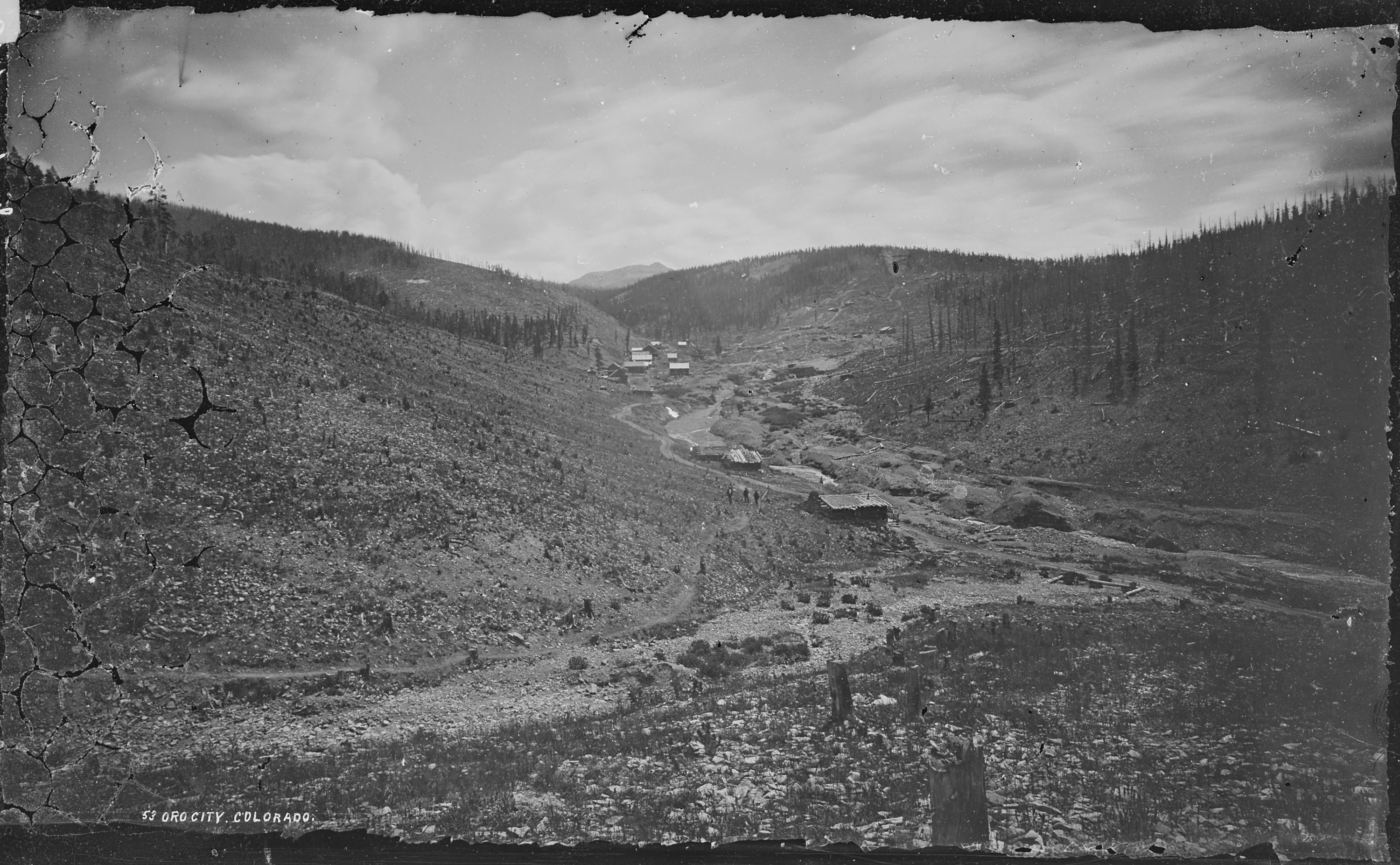
Oro City ~ circa 1874-1879

Oro City is a ghost town in Lake County, Colorado, United States

== Description ==
The community was an early Colorado gold placer mining town located near Leadville in the California Gulch. Oro is the Spanish word for gold. Oro City was the site of one of the single richest placer gold strikes in Colorado, with estimated gold production of 120,000 to 150,000 troy ounces (4 to 5 metric tons), worth $2.5 to $3 million at the then-price of $20.67 per troy ounce (31.1 grams).

== Geography ==
The site of Oro City is at 39°14′05″N 106°15′08″W. It is in California Gulch, about a mile (1.6 km) northeast of Leadville in the Mosquito Range of Lake County, Colorado, United States.

== History ==
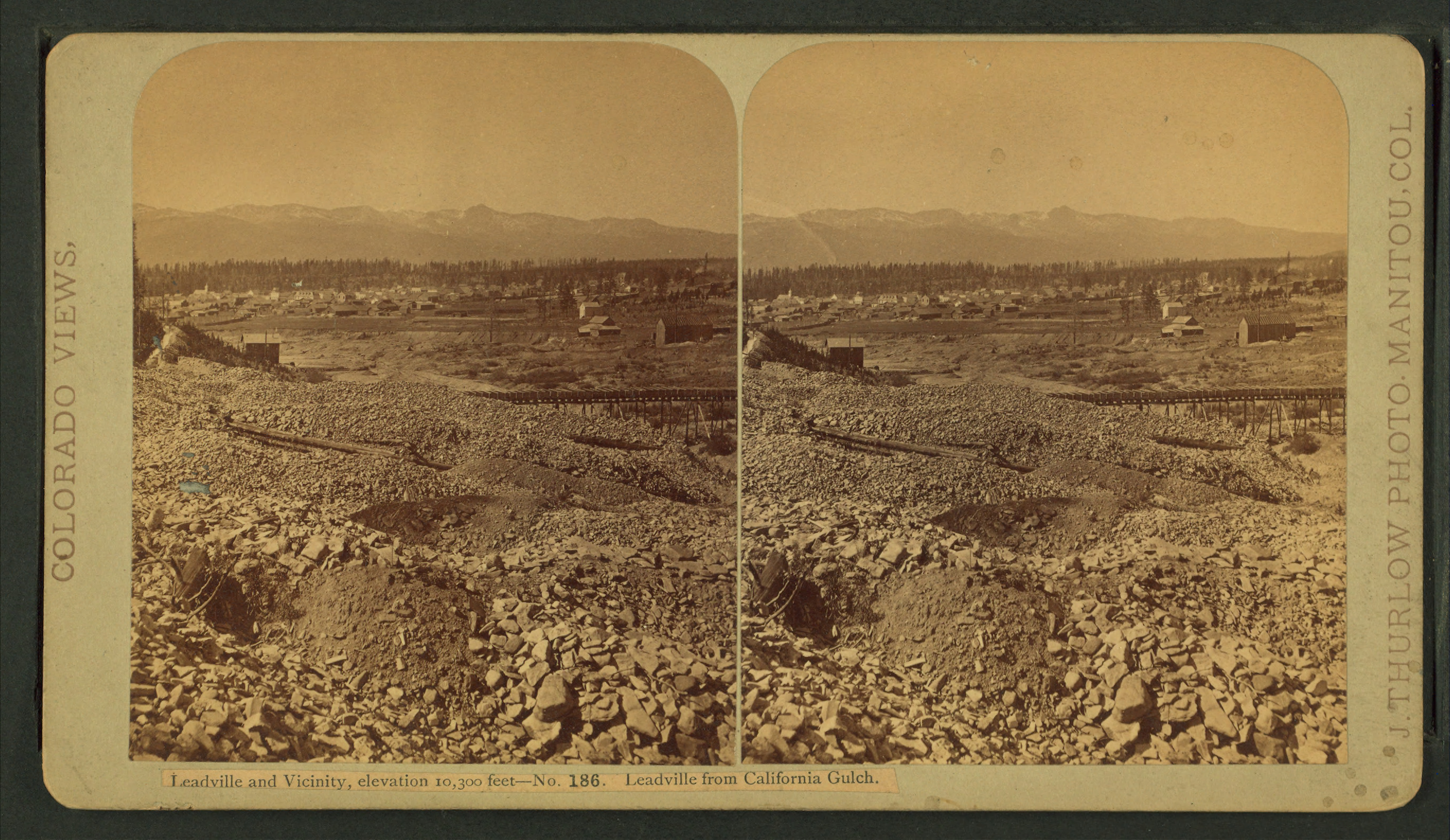
Leadville, from California Gulch, by Thurlow, J. (1831–1878)

Gold was discovered in the area in late 1859, during the Pike's Peak Gold Rush. However the initial discovery, where California Gulch empties into the Arkansas River, was not rich enough to cause excitement. On 26 April 1860, Abe Lee made a rich discovery of placer gold on California Gulch six miles (9.7 km) east of the Arkansas River, and Oro City was founded at the new diggings. By July 1860, the town and surrounding area had a population of 10,000. An estimated $2 million in gold was taken out the first summer from California Gulch and nearby Iowa Gulch, but within a few years the richest part of the placers had been exhausted, and the population of Oro City was several hundred. Many claims (each measuring 100 feet (30.5 meters) along the stream) were consolidated, and worked by ground sluicing. A ditch was dug in 1877 to provide water for hydraulic mining, but the hydraulic mining was reported to be unsuccessful.

Placer mining had always been hampered by a heavy brown sand. As early as 1874, one of the miners determined that the brown sand was the lead mineral cerussite, and that the sand also carried high values of silver. Some veins of gold ore had already been found, but following the brown sand to its sources in the bedrock led to the discovery of large and rich silver deposits. The silver started a new and larger rush, and Oro City filled with silver prospectors, but most people went instead to the new city of Leadville nearby. The 1890 census found the population of Oro to be 222.

== Notable resident ==
- Horace Tabor, one of the placer miners in Oro City in 1860

== See also ==
- List of ghost towns in Colorado
