= California Gulch =

Area in Lake County, Colorado, US

Coordinates: 39°13′27.96″N 106°20′58.09″W

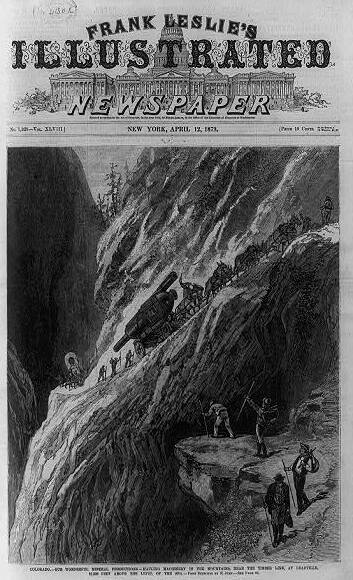
Newspaper Leadville: Our wonderful mineral productions - hauling machinery in the mountains, near the timberline, at Leadville, 10,500 feet above the level of the sea

The California Gulch site consists of approximately 18 square miles in Lake County, Colorado. The area includes the city of Leadville, parts of the Leadville Historic Mining District and a section of the Arkansas River from the confluence of California Gulch downstream to the confluence of Two-Bit Gulch. The site was listed as a Superfund site in 1983.

== History ==
Mining in the Leadville area began in 1859 when prospectors working in the channels of the Arkansas River tributaries discovered gold at the mouth of California Gulch. In April 1860, one of the richest discoveries of placer gold in Colorado was discovered at California Gulch. By 1872, placer mining in California Gulch yielded more than $2,500,000, roughly equivalent to $47,674,478 today. In 1876, piles of sand once considered bothersome to placer gold miners, were discovered to contain lead carbonates and were traced back to California Gulch. This discovery propelled a rush of miners to the area. The town of Leadville was founded a year later by mine owners Horace Austin Warner Tabor and August Meyer. Mining, mineral processing, and smelting in and near Leadville produced gold, silver, lead, copper, manganese, and zinc for more than 130 years. Wastes generated during the mining and ore processing contained metals, such as cadmium, copper, lead, and zinc.

These wastes remained on the land surface and migrated through the environment by washing into streams and leaching contaminants into surface water and groundwater. Investigation of the site began in the mid-1980s. California Gulch was designated a Superfund Site in 1983, shortly after the Environmental Protection Agency created the program. In 1998, the EPA and the state of Colorado signed agreements to provide public access to open space near the Arkansas River. State and local governments purchased more than 2,300 acres of ranch land that serve as wildlife habitat and recreational resources. A soccer complex was built on part of the site in 2009 and in 2013 a 21,000 square foot skate park opened. In 2014, the Colorado Parks and Wildlife Commission honored the site with a Gold Medal Trout Waters designation. The designation highlights the Upper Arkansas River's improved water quality and revitalized habitats for trout and other wildlife.

== Superfund site ==
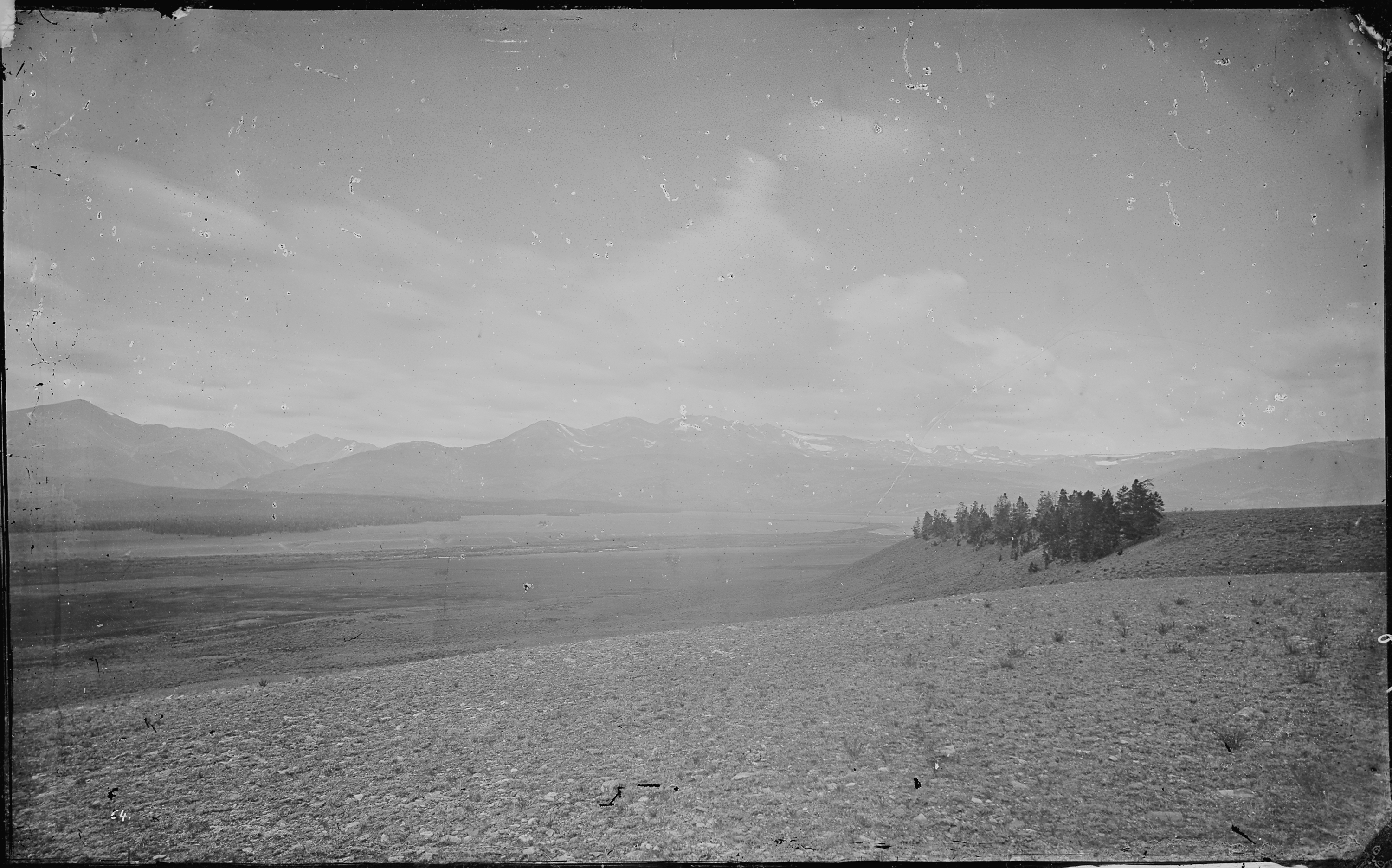
Grand or massive mountain, from near mouth of California Gulch, Sawatch Range. Photograph by William Henry Jackson, 1873.

California Gulch is one of the many Superfund sites in Colorado. The Superfund program is responsible for cleaning up contaminated land and responding to environmental emergencies, oil spills and natural disasters in the United States. California Gulch was placed on the National Priorities List (NPL) in 1983 due to health risks associated with people ingesting and touching contaminants from the former mining operations found in soil, sediment, surface water, groundwater, liquid waste, solid waste, and sludge. A preliminary estimate in 2006 for the damages to aquatic and terrestrial environments was between $53 million and $68 million. The second largest settlement in Colorado history was reached in 2008 when the parties agreed on a $20.5 million natural resource damages settlement.

Since the 1850s, byproduct materials, such as tailings and slag, have been left by mining operations. High levels of heavy metals and mine drainage raised concerns of high blood lead levels in residents, particularly in children. This hazardous waste and low-pH water also reduced biological diversity and caused stress in the ecosystem, decreasing the trout populations. The most concerning contaminants are arsenic, cadmium, copper, lead, manganese, and zinc.

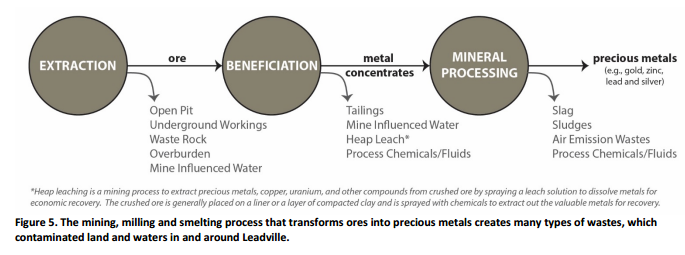
The mining, milling and smelting process that transforms ores into precious metals creates many types of wastes, which contaminated land and waters in and around Leadville.

Since 1995, removal and remedial activities have been conducted through federal, state, and PRP actions to consolidate, contain and control more than 350,000 cubic yards of contaminated soils, sediments and mine-processing wastes. Potentially Responsible Parties (PRPs) and the EPA work on the cleanup by conducting drainage controls to prevent acid mine runoff, cleanup of residential properties, reuse of slag, and consolidation and containment of contaminated soils, sediments, and mine-processing wastes. The Yak Treatment Plant was also built and it is still in operation. The EPA divided the site into 12 Operable Units (OUs), with the twelfth OU surrounding the whole NPL site and tests the groundwater conditions. The residential areas of Leadville and Lake County are in OU9. The EPA found concentrations of lead in the soil in some areas that exceeded the soil action levels of 3,500 parts per million, causing a risk of lead poisoning in the population.

EPA completed various Five-Year Reviews to evaluate the implementation and performance of the Environmental remedy to determine if it is or will be protective of human health (public health) and the environment. The last one was published in February 2017. Current actions for long-term protection include assessment of institutional controls for OUs 1, 2, 4 and 10 to guarantee the continue safety levels, implementation of institutional controls for OU-5, possible investigations in OU-3, and updates and implementation of operation and maintenance plans for OUs 5 and 7.

The EPA has deleted 9 OUs and proposed to delete several other OUs from the NPL. The EPA and the Colorado Department of Public Health and Environment proposed to delete OUs 4, 5 and 7 from the NPL in August 2014.

Despite the risk of exposure being low, Pregnant and nursing women, and young children are encouraged to test their blood-lead levels. Lake County continues to offer free blood-lead testing.

=== 12 operable units ===
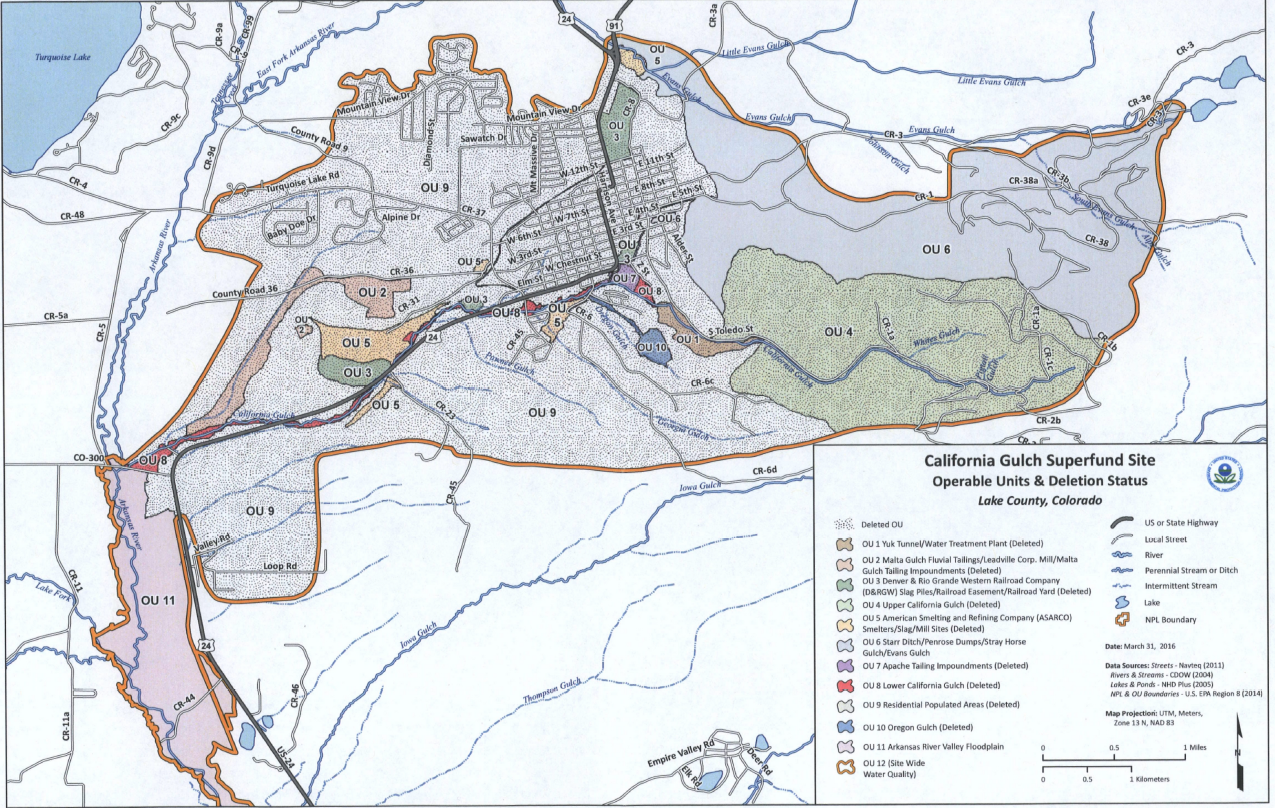
Map of California Gulch Superfund site, Operable Units and Deletion Status, March 31, 2016 EPA

- OU1 Water treatment is ongoing since 1992.
- OU2 Zoned for industrial mining and includes the Malta Gulch drainage. EPA deleted OU2 from the Superfund program's National Priorities List (NPL) in June 2001. This abandoned lab used to be an ore mill from the early 1970's thru 1986. To extract the silver, the ore was pulverized and put through a cyanide leach process.
- OU3 Slag has been removed and consolidated into the Arkansas Valley slag pile. Based on current land use, EPA determined that slag does not pose elevated health risks.
- OU4 Water diversion channels and settling ponds were constructed to prevent heavy metals from flowing into the surface water.
- OU5 Location of historic smelter sites and a Zinc-Lead mill site. "Smelter waste, waste rock, and tailings from the milling process were consolidated and capped with a soil cover on site."
- OU6 Design of the Environmental remediation is ongoing. It includes large improvements on the clean water diversion systems, reduction of the amount of acid rock drainage (ARD) generated, enhancements on the current ARD collection system and retention ponds, and implementation of land use restrictions to protect engineered remedies and reduce exposure to contaminants that will remain in place.
- OU7 ASARCO, a PRP, consolidated and capped this tailings pile in 2002.
- OU8 EPA deleted OU8 from the NPL in January 2010 after the removal of tailings, non-residential soils and stabilizing a channel in 2002 by a PRP.
- OU9 Located in the residential areas of Leadville and Lake County. EPA found concentrations of lead in the soil in some areas of this OU exceeded the soil action levels of 3,500 parts per million, causing risk of lead contamination in the population. In the mid and late 1990s, 2 programs were launched in Leadville and Lake County respectively with the goal of reducing children's exposure to lead and to educate the community about lead. Performance goals for the remedy were met in 2006. In 2009, EPA completed soil sampling and remediation for property owners that responded to a final call. EPA deleted OU9 from the NPL in September 2011.
- OU10 Zoned for industrial mining, it includes part of the Oregon Gulch drainage and the Oregon Gulch Tailing Impoundment. EPA deleted this OU from the NPL in April 2001.
- OU11 Located by the Arkansas River. EPA signed a Record of Decision in 2005 and completed field work in 2010. EPA is still monitoring and maintaining the reclaimed areas until the revegetation is deemed mature and self-sustaining.
- OU12 Monitoring of the surface and groundwater quality of this operable unit is ongoing. Remedy also includes a technical impracticability waiver for specific action levels and institutional controls.

== Hazards ==
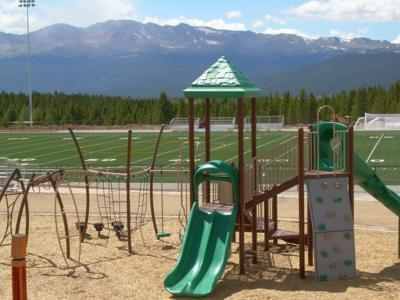
EPA Superfund Sites in Reuse in Colorado - Sports Complex

According to the EPA, the Current Human Exposure status of the California Gulch site is considered to be Not Under Control. Operable Unit 12, responsible for Sitewide Surface and Groundwater Quality, is currently in the remedial action phase of cleanup. This phase includes construction or implementation of the project design, but not complete cleanup. In order for the human exposure status of the site to be considered under control, contamination levels must be safe and controls must be in place to prevent human exposure. Since the area is a major water supply to surrounding homes and businesses, monitoring of lead levels in the groundwater is currently ongoing and thus far indicates that contaminant levels have declined or remained stable. Although risk may be low, blood lead levels are a major concern, especially for pregnant women, nursing mothers, and children as contaminants can cause a variety of adverse health effects such as cell toxicity or neurodevelopmental defects. As a result, current blood-lead testing, outreach and education programs are being implemented in the Lake County area. The next step in the cleanup process is to conduct a 5-year review to determine the success of the current plan in protecting human health and the environment.

== Leadville status ==
The population in Leadville has been relatively stable for the last 30 years. Since 1983, several residential areas were able to be removed from the Superfund site designation due to the ongoing cleanup by the EPA. Residents were relieved to no longer be overshadowed by the Superfund stigma. Real estate values have continued to increase, which is in sync with the market in Colorado. According to Trulia, Leadville has seen an increase of $46,000 (26%) in the median home price in the last year. Similarly, in the last year the price per square foot has increased from $131 to $188. These statistics indicate that the spill has not had a significant adverse impact on the growth for Leadville; however, it also highlights the need for ongoing monitoring and sustainable solutions for existing and expanding residents.

The Arkansas River was named a "gold medal" trout stream in January 2014. The designation significantly helped tourism revenue for the town. Guides reported a 25% increase in trout guided tours after the designation. Even locals who used to overlook the Arkansas river for fishing, now enjoy what is now the longest segment of Gold Medal trout water in CO. The Denver Post quoted Stu Pappenfort, a river ranger with the Arkansas Headwaters Recreation Area, as saying, "When I was a kid and we used to come out here fishing, we skipped over the Arkansas and went to the Taylor and the Gunnison. The heavy metals really impacted the size of the fish. There was a good number of them, but not the ones you wanted to hold up in the picture. So we skipped over it." As a result of the clean up efforts and the Gold Medal designation, there were over 100,000 anglers fishing the Arkansas between Leadville and Parkdale in 2012.
