= Abandoned mine drainages in Colorado =

According to a survey completed by the Colorado Geological Survey between 1991 and 1999, the number of abandoned mines in Colorado is 18,382. The Arkansas Headwaters, Las Animas River, Rio Grande Headwaters, Alamosa, and Uncompahgre were the priority watersheds studied in this survey. In the survey, analysis was completed with Environmental Degradation Measures ranging from none to extreme. Results showed 26 abandoned mines with extreme degradation and mineral hazards, 219 with significant degradation, and 672 potentially significant hazards.

In recent years, abandoned mine drainage has led to major environmental events, such as the 2015 Gold King Mine waste water spill.

== Extent ==
Colorado has ten mines with active water treatment. These ten mines produce 4.7 billion gallons of polluted water per year. Of them, two are abandoned, seven are closed, and one is active. The one active mine, Climax, will produce 2.9 billion gallons of polluted water at its new site. The abandoned mine at Summitville produced 235 million gallons of polluted water needing treatment in 2012 and is projected to produce even more in 2016 at 380 million gallons. The second site in the Earthworks report is the Captain Jack mine, which produces 26 million gallons of polluted water per year.

== Effects on water quality ==
Acid mine drainage forms when water and oxygen react with sulfur-bearing materials in exposed rock. The resulting acidic water was can dissolve metals and carry them into surface water or groundwater. The sulfuric acid causes leaching of iron, manganese, lead, copper, zinc and cadmium from the rock it interacts with. Acid mine drainage is caused by both abandoned mines and mines in current excavation. Acid mine drainage (AMD) is responsible for surface water pollution in the mid-Atlantic region, as well. In 2012, a report published by the Colorado Division of Reclamation Mining and Safety (DRMS) described the abandoned mine land (AML) areas with greatest need for remediation. Most of these sites no longer have an entity accountable for the costs associated with remediation.

Streams and other water sources are affected by drainage from AML, estimated at as many as 89% of Colorado streams. The South Platte watershed and river basin project is estimated to cost more than two million dollars in characterization, engineering, and reclamation. The areas being addressed in this project to reduce the water contamination include:

1. South Platte Watershed - London Mine and Waldorf Mine;
2. Upper Colorado River Basin - Saint Johns Mine;
3. Rio Grande River Basin;
4. Arkansas River Basin - Venture Mine Complex and Champion Mine and Mill;
5. Gunnison River Basin - Daisy Mine.

== Ecologic effects ==
Acid mine drainage causes many environmental concerns, one of which is the effect on wildlife, fish and surrounding vegetation. Lead, cadmium, and arsenic are some of the major concerns and detrimental to the ecosystem downstream of the mine drainage. Treatment of acid mine drainage is listed as one of the state's Top 10 winnable battles in gaining clean water. The Colorado Department of Public Health and Environment treats nearly 98 million gallons of water a year from five mining sites alone.

== Examples and impact ==
=== Argo Tunnel ===
The Argo Tunnel was completed in 1910 for the purpose of mining gold during the Colorado Gold Rush. The Argo Tunnel served all major gold mines in Idaho Springs at the time. The main purpose of the tunnel was for transporting ore out of the tunnel and onto trains. Argo Tunnel ceased production after a mining disaster in 1943, in which 4 miners died because of a large volume of naturally impounded water flooding the area they were in. The site has been a tourist attraction since the 1970s. Drainage from the Argo Tunnel flows into the Clear Creek River, which is part of a watershed affecting more than one-quarter million people who live in the Denver area. Since the opening of the Argo Tunnel in the early 1900s, there has been discharge of acidic water with high concentrations of heavy metals flowing into the Clear Creek River. The Argo Tunnel discharges water with a pH between 2 and 3, which is below both water quality and drinking water standards. On average, about 850 pounds of dissolved metals are released from the tunnel each day. Because of the high volume of acidic and metallic water flowing into a major water source for parts of the Denver area, many projects have been created to eliminate this issue. One project was the Argo Tunnel Water Treatment Facility, which focused on decreasing and eliminating the acidity and high levels of metal in the water. The plant began treating water in April 1998 and recently was upgraded from a low-density lime precipitation process to a high-density sludge process in June 2013.

=== Summitville Mine ===
Summitville Mine opened in the 1870s, mining gold and silver. During the 1980s, the company, Summitville Consolidated Mining Company, started open-pit mining of gold ore. Open-pit mining uses cyanide, which is poured over the broken-down ore and dissolves the gold. After this process, gold is extracted from the bottom and processed. Environmental problems followed after the beginning of open-pit mining, as acidic and metal-rich water drained into the Alamosa River. Drainage from open-pit mining often has a pH below 3 and high to extreme concentrations of metals. This new process of mining also exposed large volumes of previously oxidized sulfides that affected groundwater. Since the Summitville Mine runs next to the Alamosa River, this drainage affected livestock, agricultural irrigation and wildlife habitat. It is believed that this drainage also explains the 1990 disappearance of stocked fish from the Terrace Reservoir and some farm hold ponds along the river. In the early 1990s the state took over Summitville Mines with help from the EPA. Plans were created to clean up the area and mitigate the environmental damage.

The following is a time line of this major operation:

1994-1995	Heap Leach Pad detoxification.
1996	Cropsy Waste Pile, Beaver Mud Dump, Summitville Dam Impoundment and mine pit closure.
1996-2000	Modification to the existing water treatment plant
1998	Heap Leach Pad cap complete.
1998	Completion of Heap Leach Pad, North Waste Dump.
2002	Complete site wide reclamation.
2004	Complete water treatment plant design.
2004-2005	Complete contaminant source collection structures.
2008-2009	Wightman Fork and Summitville Dam Impoundment improvement, installation of micro-hydro-power.
2010	Begin construction of new water treatment plant.
2011	Completed construction of new water treatment plant.
2013	Completed reconstruction of the Wightman Fork rundown structure; Summitville Mine site achieved the site-wide construction completion milestone.

=== Gold King Mine ===
Discovered in 1887 by Olaf Nelson for the purpose of mining the abundant gold in the city of Silverton, Colorado, the Gold King mine has had many owners throughout its existing. Gold King Mine was shut down in 1923, but subsequent operations continued until as recently as 1991. The Gold King Mine has been in the clean-up process since operations stopped. A blockage in one of the emptying pipes created a buildup of pressure and acidic water over time. When it came to remove the blockage and continue with the cleanup process, the EPA and DRMS teams agreed on how to resolve the issue and continued with the clean up. Shortly after they started, pressure overwhelmed the blockage and the water began flowing downstream into the San Juan River and Animas River. The release sent about three million gallons of acidic, mine-impacted water into Cement Creek, a tributary of the Animas River. Residents were advised to have their water tested, to keep domestic animals away from the rivers, and not to fish or swim in the river.

A timeline shows the clean-up process from start to end:

Wednesday, August 5, 2015	EPA sends a team to look over the Gold King Mine in Silverton. Upon arrival, they noticed the pipe that drains the mine is plugged. They discuss how to unplug it, but underestimated the water and pressure that had accumulated behind the blockage. The blowout caused an overwhelming amount of acidic water to flow into Cement Creek, which then drains into the Animas river.
Thursday, August 6, 2015	EPA announces their team caused blowout. The wastewater reaches Durango by evening. La Plata County Sheriff closes the Animas River. Groups from New Mexico, Arizona, Utah and the Navajo Nation outline an estimate for when the wastewater will hit their lands.
Friday, August 7, 2015	EPA starts to clean up and rebuild the settlement ponds at the entrance of the mine. They also start advance testing on the river and conduct aerial flights to view the extent of the spill and clean up.
Saturday, August 8, 2015	Colorado Parks and Wildlife have caught and placed fingerling trout in baskets along the river to help save this species from being affected by the wastewater. The wastewater flow is down to 550 gallons per minute compared to 740 gallons per minute on Friday. Wastewater has reached New Mexico. Aztec and San Juan both shut down their water intakes.
Sunday August 9	EPA revises the estimate of the total amount of wastewater spilled from 1 million gallons to 3 million gallons. Aircraft flying over Farmington and Durango say that the wastewater is dissipating as it flows down the San Juan.
Monday, August 10, 2015	Colorado Gov. John Hickenlooper makes an announcement about the wastewater flowing from the Gold King Mine, and announces future efforts to focus on other abandoned mines throughout Colorado to prevent a similar disaster.
Tuesday, August 11, 2015	John Hickenlooper arrives in Durango and discussions begin with the EPA concerning when the river will be safe to open again.
August 17	EPA administrator, Gina McCarthy, reports no one has experienced adverse health effects as a result of the wastewater blowout.
Wednesday, August 12, 2015	Durango begins testing the water in the Animas River.
Thursday, August 13, 2015	EPA states the water from the Animas River around Durango is back to similar levels of acidity and metal content as before the wastewater blowout.
Friday, August 14, 2015	The Animas River reopens to boaters. CDPHE states the water is back to levels that won't affect human health during typical recreation. New Mexico lifts ban on use of private wells stemming from the Animas River Valley.

== Management ==
=== Current management ===
The containment and ultimate clean-up of abandoned mines is a challenging problem, as interested parties comprise federal, state, and local governments, property owners, non-profit environmental organizations, and others. Many of the mines were abandoned when regulations did not exist concerning the rehabilitation of the mine’s land. Another complicating facet of acid mine drainage from abandoned mines is the downstream impacts, which affect myriad stakeholders. In terms of the actual locations of abandoned mines in Colorado, most are located on federally managed land, either the Department of Interior’s Bureau of Land Management (BLM) or the United States Department of Agriculture’s National Forest Service (NFS). Approximately 19,000 are located on NFS land with an additional 3,400 abandoned mines on BLM land. Several existing federal programs can be tapped for funding the remediation of abandoned mines including the Surface Mining Control and Reclamation Act of 1977 (SMCRA), the Comprehensive Environmental Response, Compensation, and Liability Act of 1980 (CERCLA) which provides money for sites designated Superfunds, and the Clean Water Act Grant Program. There is no single party responsible for the remediation of abandoned mines. Efforts have historically been funded by a combination of these available sources and coordinated by multiple agencies. One example is the Animas River Stakeholders Group, or ARSG, which comprises government agencies, citizen groups, and private entities – mostly mining corporations. This collaboration was dubbed a “pilot success” in a joint BLM and NFS report published in 2007. The subsequent Gold King Mine disaster in this very watershed illustrates the shortcomings of even the most organized efforts to mitigate environmental effects of abandoned mines.

=== Looking ahead ===
The Gold King Mine disaster brought the importance and danger of abandoned mines back into the public eye. Policy makers sought to formalize a process to identify, prioritize, and fund the reclamation of abandoned mines via the Hardrock Mining Reform and Reclamation Act of 2015 (HMRRA). This law would have created a fund specifically for the reclamation of abandoned mines and a new reclamation fee to be collected from current and future mining activities. The HMRRA never made it out of committee in either the House of Representatives’ Subcommittee on Energy and Mineral Resources or the Senate’s Committee on Energy and Natural Resources. In 2016, the Colorado Department of Public Health and the Environment (CDPHE) organized a $300,000 project, in conjunction with the Colorado Geological Survey, to inventory Colorado’s abandoned mines and prioritize each site’s reclamation according to current or potential environmental and human health impacts. While the intent of this project is merely to inventory the abandoned mines, the report will be a valuable asset if and when more funds become available for remediation.
