= Elkton =

Elkton may refer to:

== Communities ==
=== Canada ===
- Elkton, Alberta

=== United States ===
- Elkton, Colorado
- Elkton, Florida
- Elkton, Kentucky
- Elkton, Maryland
- Elkton, Michigan
- Elkton, Minnesota
- Elkton, Missouri
- Elkton, Ohio
- Elkton, Oregon
- Elkton, South Dakota
- Elkton, Tennessee
- Elkton, Virginia

== See also ==
- Elkton Township, Clay County, Minnesota
- West Elkton, Ohio
