= Jennifer Whalen =

Jennifer Whalen may refer to:

- Jennifer Whalen (actress), Canadian actor and comedian
- Jennifer Whalen (cyclist), American racing cyclist

== See also ==
- Whalen, people with the last name Whalen
