= Robert Friedland =

Canadian-American businessman

- Born: Robert Martin Friedland; Chicago, Illinois, US
- Education: Reed College (BA)
- Occupation: Investor
- Known for: Founder, Ivanhoe Mines
- Spouse: Darlene M. Friedland
- Children: 3
- Awards: Canadian Mining Hall of Fame inductee

Robert Martin Friedland is an American-Canadian billionaire financier in the mining industry. Since the early 1980s, he has specialized in securing funding for the exploration and development of mineral and energy resources and technology ventures. He is the founder and chairman of his private, family-owned firm, Ivanhoe Capital Corporation, which is active in capital markets, focused on emerging markets. He is the founder and co-chairman of Ivanhoe Mines, a Canadian public company listed on the Toronto and OTCQX exchanges.

== Early life ==
Friedland was born in Chicago, Illinois, the eldest of three children born to immigrant parents Ilona (née Muller) and Albert Friedland. Friedland's father survived three years in Auschwitz while his mother worked as a forced laborer during the Holocaust.

=== LSD ===
Robert Friedland resigned from Bowdoin College in 1970 after being arrested by federal authorities for the possession of an estimated $100,000 worth of LSD. He was sentenced to two years in federal prison, but received early release on probation. The conviction was expunged in 1986.

He graduated in 1974 from Reed College, Oregon, with a political science degree. During his senior year at Reed, Friedland was student body president.

=== All One Farm ===
During his time at Reed he met Steve Jobs with whom he shared an interest in Eastern spirituality. At the time, Friedland served as the caretaker of an apple farm south of Portland that was owned by his millionaire uncle Marcel Muller and Jobs would come on the weekends and help with the apple orchard, which served as the inspiration for the name of his company, Apple Inc. Friedland turned the orchard into a commune called All One Farm. His followers were not paid for working on commercial endeavors there.

== Career ==
Friedland got his start as the CEO of Galactic Resources Ltd. Raising over US$300 million in investments, he established a gold mine at Summitville, Colorado. Against contractor advice, Friedland decided to implement the relatively new mining technology of heap leaching for the site during the middle of a snowy winter. The sodium cyanide solution used to extract ore soon spilled from the mine as the heap-leach liner collapsed. Carried by heavy rain and snow, the cyanide and other heavy metals contaminated the Alamosa River, causing the deaths of fish as far as 17 miles downstream from the mine. The clean-up of the mine cost the EPA over 100 million dollars, and Galactic Resources soon went bankrupt in 1992. Friedland resigned from his positions at Galactic Resources on the day that the EPA issued their notice to Colorado regulators that they were taking action at Summitville. Claiming to have only based his decisions on mining expert advice and having resigned two years before Galactic Resources went bankrupt, Friedland denied responsibility for the environmental damage to Summitville.

Friedland is currently the executive co-chairman of Ivanhoe Mines Ltd. (IVN: TSX, IVPAF: OTCQX), a Canadian mining company focused on advancing three joint-venture projects in Southern Africa: copper production from a major new mine at the Kamoa-Kakula copper discoveries near Kolwezi in the Democratic Republic of Congo (DRC); mine development at the Platreef palladium-platinum-nickel-copper-rhodium-gold discovery near Mokopane in South Africa; and the extensive redevelopment and upgrading of the historic Kipushi zinc-copper-germanium-silver mine, also in the DRC. Ivanhoe also is exploring for new copper discoveries on its wholly owned Western Foreland exploration licences in the DRC, near the Kamoa-Kakula Project. The current Ivanhoe Mines was launched in 1993 as African Minerals to pursue mineral interests in Southern Africa. It was renamed Ivanplats Limited in 2011, and then Ivanhoe Mines in 2013.

Friedland also operates Ivanhoe Capital from its corporate headquarters in Singapore – a location that has facilitated his focus on the Asia Pacific region. Ivanhoe Capital has specialized in the provision of venture capital, project financing and related financial services for a roster of international business enterprises since its founding in 1987.. Mr. Friedland was inducted into the Canadian Mining Hall of Fame in 2016 and into the American Hall of Fame in 2021 for his outstanding lifetime achievements advancing the global mineral resources industry.

Friedland was CEO of the original Ivanhoe Mines (now named Turquoise Hill Resources (TRQ: TSX & NYSE)), which he founded as Indochina Goldfields in 1994 and led to a successful initial public offering on the Toronto Stock Exchange in 1996. He was chairman, and later executive chairman, until 2011. Exploration by Ivanhoe Mines since 2000 discovered a chain of copper, gold and silver deposits at Oyu Tolgoi (Turquoise Hill) in Mongolia's South Gobi region. The first phase of what is independently projected to be one of the world's largest porphyry copper and gold mines (Oyu Tolgoi) began commercial production in 2013. The original Ivanhoe Mines was renamed Turquoise Hill Resources (TRQ: TSX & NYSE) in 2012. Turquoise Hill Resources is focused on the operation and further development of the Oyu Tolgoi copper-gold mine.

Friedland was the Chairman of Diamond Fields Resources when it was bought out for $4.3 billion by Michael Sopko's INCO for its rich Voisey's Bay development. The deal earned Friedland a seat on the board of INCO, from which he benefited by Companhia Vale do Rio Doce's 2006 bid for INCO.

Friedland's other corporate leadership positions include or have included:

- Chief Executive Officer of Ivanhoe Capital Acquisition Corp. (IVAN: NYSE)
- Co-Chairman, of SK Global / Ivanhoe Pictures
- Chairman and CEO of High Power Exploration
- Chairman, Gold X Mining Corp.(GLDX: CVE)
- Co-Founder, Executive Co-Chairman and Chief Executive Officer of Ivanhoe Energy Inc.
- Chairman of Sunwing Holding Corporation.
- Co-Chairman of Clean TeQ Holdings (CLQ: ASX & TSX)
- Executive Chairman of Ivanplats Limited.
- Chairman and Non-Executive Director of Ivanhoe Australia Ltd. (IVA: ASX & TSX).
- Chairman, Potash One Inc.
- Founder and Co-Chairman of Diamond Fields Resources Ltd.
- Chairman and Chief Executive Officer of Galactic Resources Ltd.

== Controversies ==
=== Drug Trafficking ===
In 1970, Friedland was arrested by the FBI for drug-trafficking, after he was caught selling narcotics to an FBI agent, while in the possession of tens of thousands of LSD packs with an estimated worth of $125,000. American businessman and former close friend of Friedland, Daniel Kottke, said that when Steve Jobs and Kottke met Friedland, he was already a convicted felon.

=== The Summitville Scandal ===
In 1991, the Summitville gold mine, located in Colorado, the United States, and operated by Friedland’s company, Galactic Sources Ltd., became the center of a major scandal in which it was exposed that the company, led by Friedland, had knowingly contaminated nearby major water sources with Cyanide and other dangerous metals. The mine was quickly declared as one of the worst environmental disasters in U.S. mining history.

Friedland, who was accused of the disaster, had fled the U.S. for Singapore, shortly before the company collapsed. He was heavily criticized for avoiding accountability in a scandal that cost over $200 million, which were eventually paid by the American taxpayers, while Friedland's company has netted profits of approximately $100 million from the mine.

== Personal life ==
Robert Friedland holds dual US and Canadian citizenship and is also a resident of Singapore.

He is married to Darlene Friedland, and they have three children. His son, Govind Friedland, is a geologist.
