= Mollie Kathleen Gold Mine =

Cripple Creek, Colorado tourist attraction

Coordinates: 38°45′11″N 105°09′38″W

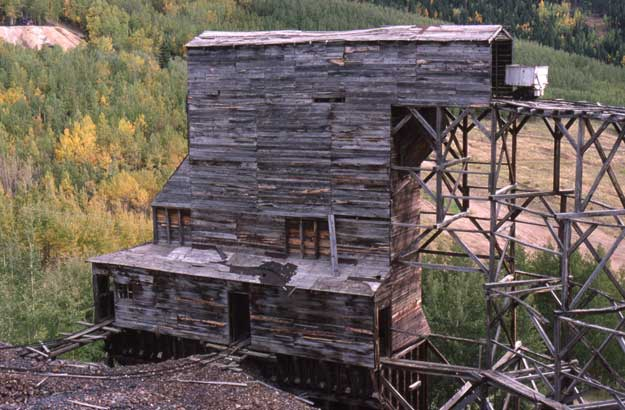
Ore bin at the Mollie Kathleen mine.

The Mollie Kathleen Gold Mine is a historic vertical shaft mine near Cripple Creek, Colorado, United States. The mine shaft descends 1,000 feet (300 m) into the mountain, a depth roughly equal to the height of the Empire State Building in New York City. The mine closed in 2024, due to the death of a tour guide. The addition of the mines and subsequent tours of this mine and others in the area had considerable effect on the economies of both Victor and Cripple Creek.

== History ==
The mine was started in 1891 on a mining claim staked by Mollie Kathleen Gortner, after whom the mine was named.

Other than a government-ordered hiatus during World War II, the mine operated continuously until 1961. The mine subsequently attracted significant tourism, until it officially closed in 2024.

On Thursday, October 10, 2024, during a tour, the elevator malfunctioned, killing one tour guide, injuring four, and leaving twelve others trapped underground—eleven tourists and a mine worker. Eleven others were rescued. Authorities hoped to repair the elevator but had a fire department crew ready for a rescue operation. All twelve people were evacuated via the elevator on Thursday evening.

In mid-January 2025, authorities reported that the accident was due to operator error – not equipment malfunction – and that the mine could reopen for the 2025 tourist season. Ultimately, they made the decision to keep it closed for the foreseeable future and have thanked everyone for allowing them to share Colorado history.

== See also ==
- Gold mining in Colorado
