= Ivanhoe Mines =

Canadian mining company

Ivanhoe Mines Ltd.
- Type: Public
- Traded as: TSX: IVN; S&P/TSX Composite Component
- Industry: Mining & Exploration
- Headquarters: Vancouver, Canada
- Key people: Robert Friedland
- Website: www.ivanhoemines.com

Ivanhoe Mines is a Canadian mining company focused on advancing its three principal projects in Southern Africa: the development of new mines at the Kamoa-Kakula copper discoveries in the Democratic Republic of the Congo (DRC), the Platreef palladium-platinum-nickel-copper-rhodium-gold discovery in South Africa, and the extensive redevelopment and upgrading of the historic Kipushi zinc-copper-germanium-silver mine, also in the DRC. Ivanhoe is also exploring for new copper discoveries on its wholly owned Western Foreland exploration licences in the DRC, near the Kamoa-Kakula Project.

== History ==
In October 2012, the company held an initial public offering (IPO) on the Toronto Stock Exchange, raising $300 million, and valuing the company at $2.5 billion. In August 2013 the company changed its name to Ivanhoe Mines, taking advantage of Friedland's right to that name.

In 2015, Ivanhoe sold half of its interest in the Kamoa copper project to the Zijin Mining Group, a Chinese mining company, for US$412 million.

In April 2017, Ivanhoe announced it had confirmed the new Kakula West discovery in the Democratic Republic of the Congo. Reported assays returned 8.86 metres grading 5.83% copper that included a higher-grade intercept of 6.17 metres grading 6.84% copper. The discovery extended the Kakula along a confirmed strike length of 6.8 kilometres.

In January 2019, Ivanhoe Mines reported an unprecedented 22.3-metre intersection of 13.05% copper in a shallow, flat-lying discovery at the Kamoa North Bonanza Zone on the Kamoa-Kakula mining licence. The drill hole DD1450 intersection included grades of up to 40% copper and is within 190 metres of the surface. In February 2020, the initial mineral resource estimate for the Kamoa North Bonanza Zone included 1.5 million tonnes of Indicated Resources grading 10.7% copper, at a 5% cut-off.

In February 2020, Ivanhoe released an independently verified, updated Mineral Resource estimate for the Kamoa-Kakula Copper Project in the Democratic Republic of Congo (DRC). The Kamoa-Kakula Project Indicated Mineral Resource now stands at 1.4 billion tonnes grading 2.7% copper, at a 1% cut-off grade, and the project's Indicated Mineral Resource now stands at 423 million tonnes grading 4.68% copper, at a 3% cut-off grade.

International mining consultant Wood Mackenzie has ranked the Kamoa-Kakula Copper Project as the world's fourth-largest copper discovery, with copper grades that are the highest by a wide margin of the world's top 10 copper deposits.

Construction of the Kakula Mine, the first of multiple planned mining areas at Kamoa-Kakula, is making excellent progress. Initial copper concentrate production from the Kakula Mine is scheduled to begin in the third quarter of 2021.

== Operations ==
Ivanhoe has three projects:

- The Kamoa-Kakula copper project, located near Kolwezi in the DRC. An independent preliminary economic assessment (PEA) issued in February 2019 indicates that Kamoa-Kakula has a potential production rate of at least 18 Mtpa. Once this expanded rate is achieved, Kamoa-Kakula is projected to become the world's second largest copper mine, with peak annual production of more than 700,000 tonnes of copper.
- Ivanhoe Mines owns 68% of Kipushi Mine, while state-owned Gécamines owns 32%. The zinc mine is located near the city of Kipushi in the DRC's Haut-Katanga province. Kipushi has an estimated 10.2 million tonnes of measured and indicated Mineral Resources grading 34.9% zinc.
- The Platreef Project, a platinum mine in Limpopo province, South Africa. Platreef is expected to eventually be one of the world's largest platinum mines.
