= Paul M. Lewis (car builder) =

American entrepreneur and inventor (1896–1990)

Paul M. Lewis (September 12, 1896 – November 27, 1990) was an American entrepreneur, inventor and car builder. He built the Airomobile (1937), Fascination (1962), three Renault powered models, and an Oldsmobile Toronado-sourced V6.

Lewis moved to Denver from Idaho Springs, Colorado, in 1933 to open a Vertical Take Off and Landing (VTOL) airplane company. He soon began constructing a mass market automobile with a three-wheeled layout. He partnered with former Franklin Motor Company engineers to design the engine. Production was sought with the Doman-Marks Engine Company, but in 1936 disputes with the Security and Exchange Commission (SEC) halted the project. The company went bankrupt in 1939.

Lewis tried again with Fascination in 1962. It was built by his Lakewood, Colorado, company Highway Aircraft Corporation. It was intended as a futuristic 130 mile-per-hour automobile with 180-degree turning capability. To build the planned vehicles he partnered with tractor cab manufacturer Egging Manufacturing Company of Gurley, Nebraska. He touted development of a Nobel Gas Plasma Engine for the car, but it never came to pass.

== See also ==
- Preston Tucker
- Buckminster Fuller
