= Snowstorm Dredge =

Mining dredge in Colorado

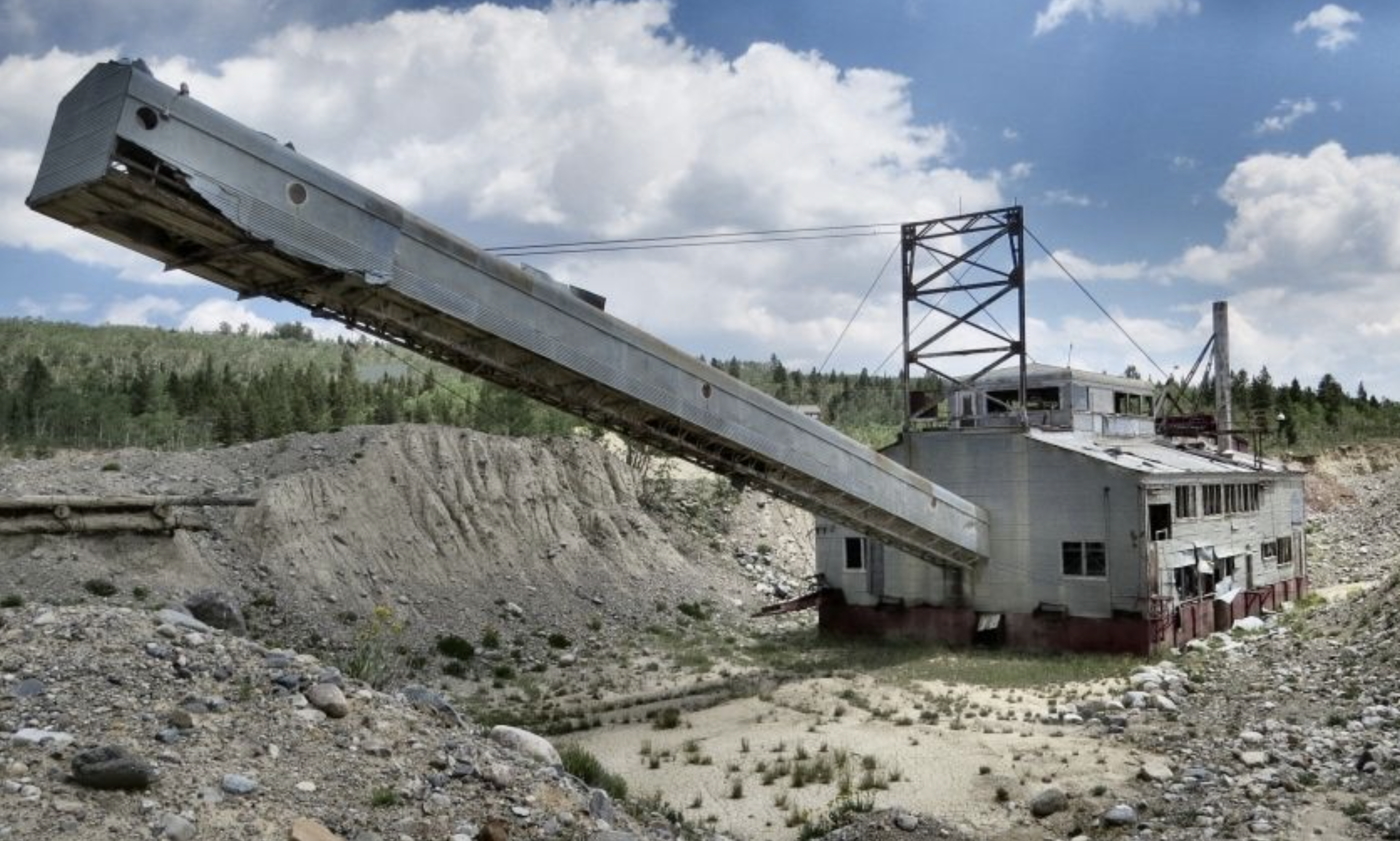
Snowstorm dredge in 2013

The Snowstorm Dredge, originally the Timberline Dredging Co. Dredge No. 2, is a defunct mining dredge in the Alma Mining District near Park County, Colorado. The dredge is located near Colorado State Highway 9. Snowstorm remains the last intact dredge in Colorado and one of very few in all of the US.

== Background ==
Mining in the area originally used placer mining techniques such as panning and hydraulic blasting. James W. Gibson discovered the Snowstorm Placer in 1870 and was awarded the trust deed to the Gibson Gulch in which the placer was located. By 1883, placer mining was well underway in the Gulch. In 1902, a team of industrialists from Detroit and Chicago purchased the claim from Gibson and founded the Snow Storm Hydraulic Company with a capitalization of $1,250,000. At this point 70 men were employed around the site working in three shifts. By the end of 1902, the company starts hydraulically blasting the placer with water nozzles, an entire community has sprung up around the site. In 1908, a reservoir was constructed above the placer to facilitate a longer mining season. Between 1904 and 1937, the placer output 11,989 ounces of gold with the yearly average fineness of gold since 1904 ranging from 0.823 to 0.830. The hydraulic and panning methods used in early mining exhausted the easily accessible gold and new methods were needed to recover gold. In 1935, the Cunningham Dredge Company purchased the Snowstorm placer and commissioned a mining dredge called the Stearns dredge for use on the Beaver Creek section of the placer. That dredge operated until 1938 when it was dismantled.

== Operations ==
Dredges, like the one at Snowstorm, are large floating platforms used to excavate and process gravel to separate gold and silver. The Snowstorm dredge is a dragline dredge, employing a large bucket suspended from a boom with cables to scoop up dirt and gravel. From the bucket, the extracted material is sent to a processing plant within the hull of the platform to be refined. A sieve sorts out the larger pieces of gravel and then a sluice system extracts the gold from the rest of the material.

The dredge was built atop a Bodinson boat and featured a 46 metre long boom, a 5.7 cubic metre bucket, and, at the time of its completion, it was the largest dredge in the state of Colorado. At peak operation, the dredge handled 7645 cubic metres of gravel per day, almost twice that of the Continental Dredge.

== History ==
=== Construction ===
In 1938, the Timberline Dredging Company was founded in Morris, Illinois. Shortly after, the Bodinson Manufacturing Company began building the dredge in San Francisco at the behest of Timberline. Timberline purchased the placer from Cunningham and, later in 1938, the old equipment from the Stearns dredge was removed from the Snowstorm placer in order to make way for the Snowstorm Dredge. The dredges components were delivered by train in 1941 to the Buena Vista railroad station and transported by trucks operated by the Gately Motor Company to Snowstorm placer. The dredge was assembled at the placer nearly 200 feet below its present location by 1942.

=== Operations ===
The Snowstorm Dredge came online in late 1941. It was forced to close again in October of 1942 after the passage of Limitation Order L-208 by the War Production board. The order classified gold as a non essential resource for war and most of the nation's gold mines were temporarily closed to bolster the workforce and resources available to mines producing supplies for the war effort. In 1945, order L-208 was revoked, however, few mines reopened immediately due to the cost of restarting operations. The dredge reopened briefly in 1947 following the conclusion of the war but closed again in 1948.

=== Closure and reactivation ===
The dredge remained shut down between 1948 and 1975. The Timberline Dragline Co. was dissolved in 1958 and sold the placer and its dredges to In 1975 the dredge was refurbished, repainted, and reopened briefly with conveyors instead of draglines and in a fixed floating position. In late 1977, the dredge was shut down permanently and replaced with a gold. The rest of the dredges in Park County were removed over the final decades of the 20th century, making Snowstorm the last surviving example. The dredge was declared a historic landmark by Park County in 1999. In 2000, a survey funded by the State Historical fund found that the nearly 60 year old dredge was in fair condition. In 2014, Gold Unlimited Inc. opened talks with the Town of Fairplay to preserve and restore the dredge for tours but as of 2025, work has not commenced due to a dispute with the owners of the land Snowstorm sits on.
