= Argo Gold Mine and Mill =

- Argo Mill
- U.S. National Register of Historic Places
- Colorado State Register of Historic Properties
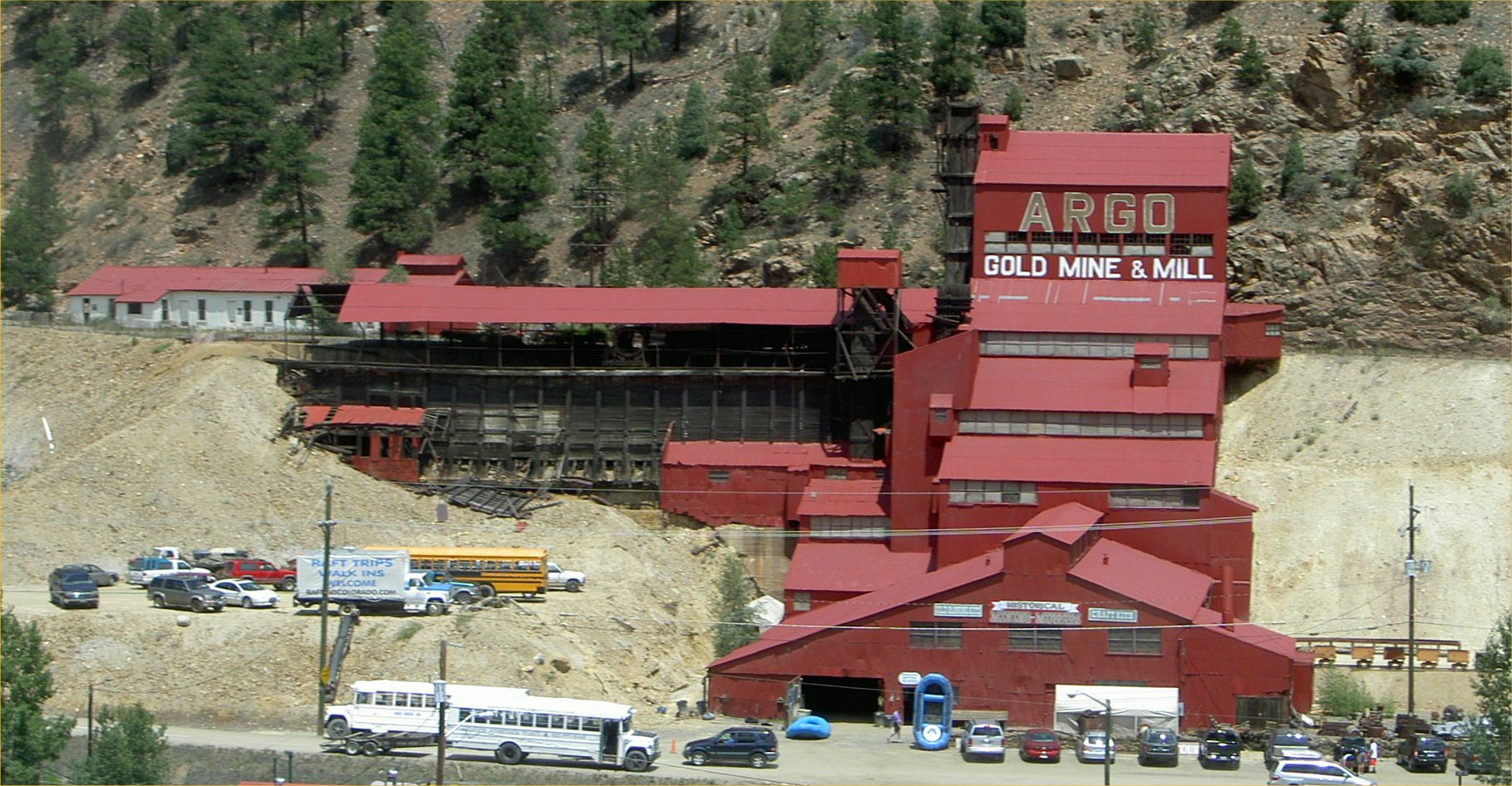

- Location within Colorado Location within the United States
- Location: 2517 Riverside Dr., Idaho Springs, Colorado
- Coordinates: 39.742867°N 105.506612°W
- Built: 1912
- NRHP reference No.: 78000836
- CSRHP No.: 5CC.76
- Added to NRHP: January 31, 1978

The Argo Gold Mine and Mill is a former gold mining and milling property in Idaho Springs, Colorado, featuring an intact gold mill built at the entrance of the Argo Tunnel. The tunnel was built between 1893 and 1910 to drain the gold mines in Virginia Canyon, Gilpin Gulch, Russell Gulch, Quartz Hill, Nevadaville, and Central City and allow easier ore removal. The success of the tunnel as an access route meant that a large volume of ore began exiting at the Idaho Springs entrance and a large mill was built to process it. At the time it was one of the largest such tunnels and milling operations in the world, directly recovering nearly $100 million in gold (11.2 million ounces) valued in 2023 at $10.1 trillion. They also sent another $200 million of high-value ores to smelters in Denver.

The property was closed in January 1943 after a major hydraulic accident in the tunnel, and never reopened after a federal moratorium was placed on gold mining during World War II. In 1976 it was purchased by a local investment group led by James N. Maxwell, who wanted to preserve an example of the Colorado gold rush mines. It was renovated and reopened as a tourist attraction and mining museum, and presently continues to offer daily tours. It was added to the National Register of Historic Places in January 1978.

== Description ==
The Argo Mill is open all year for tours, weather permitting. Visitors are provided with a brief history movie, an ore sample and mining equipment demonstration, a tour of the tunnel entrance, and a descending tour of the mill structure and extant equipment including gravity separators, amalgamation trays, and froth flotation cells. An indoor museum on the bottom level includes many mining artifacts. An outdoor museum, partly visible from the street, includes larger period equipment used in various stages of extraction, separation, and smelting. A gold panning experience is also available.

A gondola lift to a viewing and event site opened in May 2026, with capacity for mountain bikes allowing access to 28 miles (45 km) of mountain bike trails.

== See also ==
- National Register of Historic Places listings in Clear Creek County, Colorado
