= Jennifer Whalen (cyclist) =

American racing cyclist (born 1976)

Personal information
- Full name: Jennifer Whalen
- Born: 1976 (age 49–50) United States

Cycling career
- Sport: Cycling
- Discipline: MTB
- Role: Rider
- Rider type: DH

Jennifer Whalen (born 1976) is an American professional downhill mountain bike racer who won the 2005 NORBA National Championship in the Women's Super-D class. She lives in Idaho Springs, Colorado.

== Palmares ==
=== 2005 ===
- Keystone Climax (Downhill - Pro - Senior) - 4th place (United States)
- Keystone Climax (Super D - Expert - Senior - 19-29) - 3rd place (United States)
- Mount Snow-Shimano NMBS Finals (Super D - Pro) - 4th place (United States)
- Snowshoe NMBS NORBA National (SUPER D - Pro) - 2nd place (United States)
- NMBS Brian Head (SUPER D - Pro) - 1st place (United States)
- Snowmass NORBA National (SUPER D - Pro) - 4th place (United States)
- Schweitzer Norba Nationals (SUPER D - Pro) - 1st place (United States)
- Wildflower Rush Race (Downhill - Pro) - 3rd place (United States)
- Wildflower Rush Race (Super D - Senior) - 5th place (United States)
- Deer Valley NORBA National (SUPER D - Pro) - 5th place (United States)
- Chile Challenge AMBC (Super D - Expert) - 4th place (United States)
- Chile Challenge AMBC (Downhill - Pro - Senior) - 6th place (United States)
- Nova NORBA National (SUPER-D - Pro) - 7th place

=== 2004 ===
- Keystone Climax (Downhill - Pro - Senior) - 4th place (United States)
- NMBS #7-Snowmass (SUPER D - Pro) - 2nd place (United States)
- Full Tilt in Telluride (Downhill - Pro - Senior) - 3rd place (United States)
- Blast the Mass (Downhill - Pro - Senior) - 5th place (United States)
- Chile Challenge (Downhill - Pro - Senior) - 10th place

=== 2003 ===
- Final Descent - (Downhill - Pro/Expert - Senior) - 3rd place (United States)
- Chile Challenge (Downhill - Pro - Senior) - 3rd place (United States)
- Wells Fargo Rage in the Sage (Downhill - Pro - Senior) - 1st place (United States)
- Tour of Canyonlands (Downhill - Pro - Senior) - 4th place

=== 2002 ===
- Chile Challenge (Downhill - Expert - Senior - 19-29) - 1st place (United States)
- Tour of Canyonlands (Downhill - Expert - Senior - 19-29) - 2nd place

=== 2001 ===
- Telluride Mountain Bike Classic (Downhill - Expert - Senior - 19-29) - 4th place (United States)
- NORBA NCS #3 (Downhill - Expert - Senior - 25-29) - 4th place

=== 2000 ===
- Telluride Mountain Bike Classic (Downhill - Expert - Senior - 19-29) - 3rd place
