= Summitville mine =

Defunct gold mine in Colorado

- Superfund site
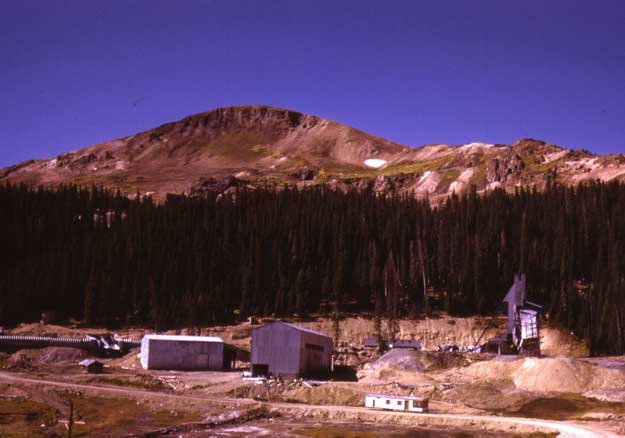
- Summitville mine site in 1980

- Location within Colorado
- Location: Del Norte, Rio Grande, Colorado; 37°26′10″N 106°35′52″W

Information
- CERCLIS ID: COD983778432
- Contaminants: Heavy metals
- Responsible parties: EPA

Progress
- Proposed: May 10, 1993
- Listed: May 31, 1994

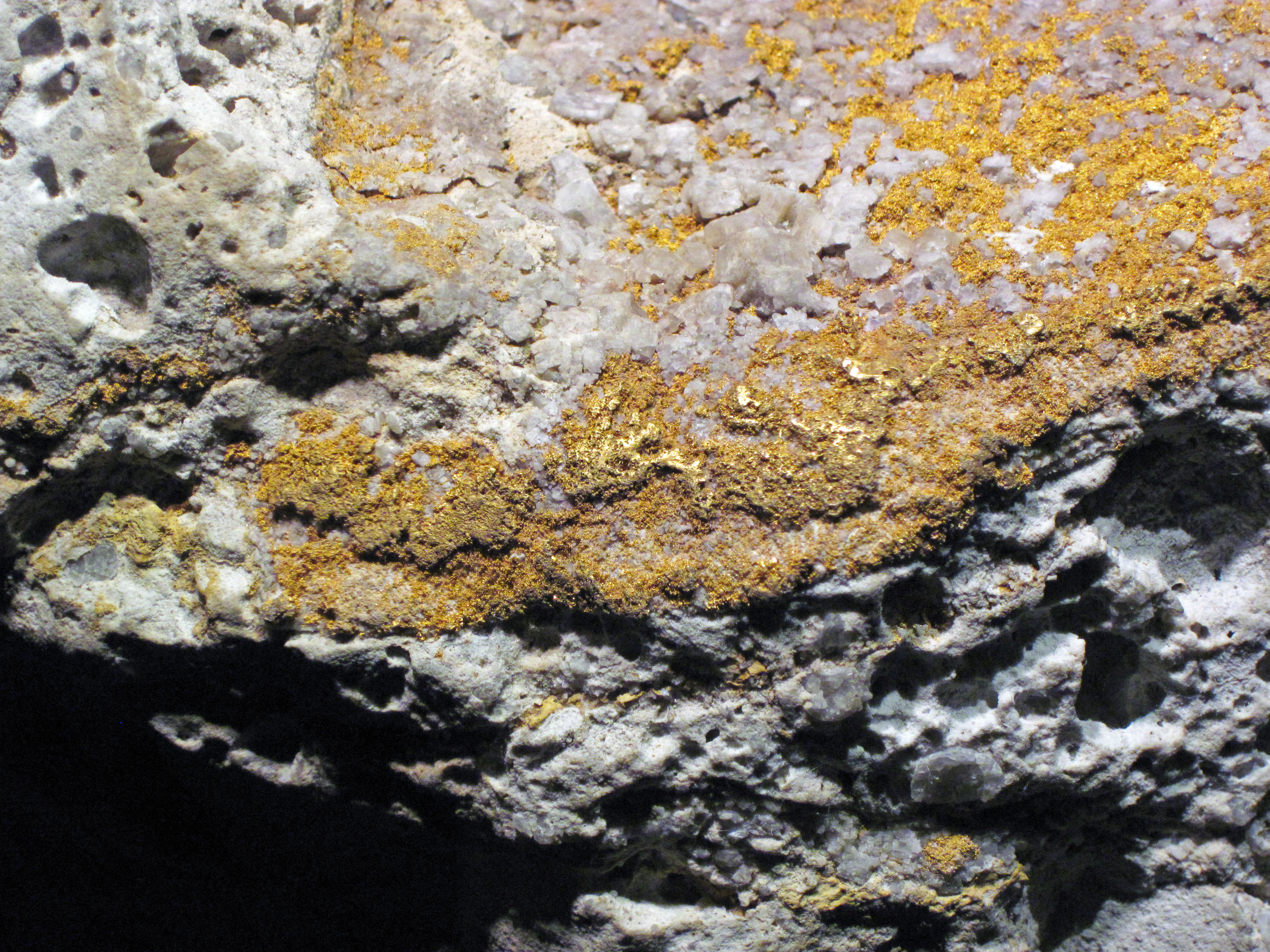
Detail of a 114-pound boulder which has an estimated 316 troy ounces of native gold. Auriferous volcanic breccia from the Little Annie Mine, Summitville. On display at Denver Museum of Nature and Science .

The Summitville mine was a gold mining site in the United States, located in Rio Grande County, Colorado 25 miles (40 km) south of Del Norte. It is remembered for the environmental damage caused in the 1980s by the leakage of mining by-products into local waterways and then the Alamosa River.

== History ==
Charles Baker's group of prospectors found traces of placer gold in the San Juan Mountains in 1860 at Eureka, Colorado. The group was forced out in 1861 by the Ute Tribe, who had been awarded the area in a US treaty. Gold was discovered in Wightman Fork, on South Mountain, which is the same location of present-day Summitville. More prospectors returned in 1871, when lode gold was found in the Little Giant vein at Arrasta Gulch, near Silverton, Colorado. The miners were allowed to stay after the Brunot Treaty of 13 Sept. 1873. In exchange for giving up 4 million acres, the Southern Ute Indian Reservation received $25,000 per year. Gold veins were found at 11,500 feet on South Mountain in 1873 and the town was founded when stamp and amalgamation mills were built.

By 1885 there were more than 250 individual claims in operation. The site was soon mined out, with the weather of the 3,500 m high site adding to difficulties. The site was re-opened on a number of occasions for gold or other metals but with little success, and prior to the site's acquisition in 1984 the last survey was in the early 1970s for copper. The total amount of gold extracted from the site from 1873 until 1959 was around 257,600 troy ounces (8,010 kg).

In 1984 an area of 1,230 acres (5.0 km^{2}) was acquired by the Canadian-based Galactic Resources Ltd. subsidiary Summitville Consolidated Mining Company, Inc. (SCMCI). They began a new large-scale open pit operation covering 550 acres (2.2 km^{2}). New techniques were used to extract gold from otherwise uneconomic ore.

The mining involved the treatment of pyritic ore with a sodium cyanide solution to leach the gold out of the ore—heap leaching (see also cyanide process). The solution (leachate) was then removed from the ore and the valuable metals extracted using activated carbon. SCMCI leached around 10 million tons of ore on a 73-acre (0.3 km^{2}) heap leach pad. The mining operations were finished in October 1991 with the leaching continuing until March 1992, when Galactic Resources filed for bankruptcy. A total of 294,365 troy ounces (9,155.8 kg) of gold and 319,814 troy ounces (9,947.3 kg) of silver were recovered. SCMCI then closed the site and converted on-site equipment for the detoxification process, with around 160 million U.S. gallons (610,000 m^{3}) of stored water needing treatment. After the company insolvency proceedings were completed in a British Columbia court, the US Government declared the site a superfund cleanup site and spent $155,000,000 of public funds cleaning up the site.

== Cease-and-desist order and aftermath ==
In 1991 SCMCI was served with a cease-and-desist order by the state government, concerned with metal levels in nearby water due to the run-off of excess water from the heap leach pad and through the damaged pad liner. Possibly 85,000 US gallons (320 m^{3}) of contaminated water had leaked into nearby creeks. In December 1992 Galactic Resources Ltd. declared itself bankrupt and declared that the site clean-up operations would halt immediately. The site clean-up was undertaken by the United States Environmental Protection Agency (EPA), from 1994 under Superfund Emergency Response. The main problem was the contaminated water held in an inadequate pond system. Another source of contamination was water leaking from older underground workings. The EPA estimated that 3,000 US gallons (11 m^{3}) were leaking from the site every minute. However, despite the water having a pH of around 3 (acidic), a USGS study stated that the run-off was no serious threat.

$155 million was spent on the site for detoxification and to reduce leakage. Robert Friedland, the chairman of Galactic Resources Ltd. paid around $30 million in settlement. Heavy metals and acid from the mine are suspected to have killed stocked fish in downstream reservoirs on the Alamosa River in 1990. Although cyanide from the heap leach pads also leaked in the watershed, cyanide is believed to have quickly volatilized into the atmosphere without damaging downstream aquatic life.

== Natural versus man made pollution ==
Rocks in the Summitville area were millions of years ago subjected to acid-sulfate alteration, which causes the streams that drain the area to be naturally acidic and naturally high in metals. The very names of nearby creeks are evidence of poor natural water quality: Iron Creek, Alum Creek, and Bitter Creek. Mining at Summitville, by exposing more rock surface to weathering, increased acidity and concentrations of dissolved metals in runoff from the mine area. The degradation in Summitville runoff water quality has its origin in both decades-old mining structures, such as the Reynold's adit, and the open-pit mining of 1985–1992.

Water runoff from the Summitville mine flows down Wightman Fork, mixes with naturally acidic runoff from unmined areas, flows into the Alamosa River and flows out of the mountains into the San Luis Valley, where it is used for crop irrigation. A United States Geological Survey investigation arrived at three major conclusions:

Extreme acid-rock drainage is the dominant long-term environmental concern at the Summitville mine and could have been predicted given the geological characteristics of the deposit. Extensive remedial efforts are required to isolate both unweathered sulfides and soluble metal salts in the open-pit area and mine-waste piles from weathering and dissolution.

It is likely that natural contamination adversely affected water quality and fish habitat in the Alamosa River long before and will continue to have adverse effects even when acid drainage from Summitville is remediated. Thus, reasonable natural conditions for the Alamosa River must be established in order to set realistic remediation conditions for the Summitville site.

Results of studies as of late 1993 indicate that mining at Summitville has had no discernible short-term adverse effects on barley or alfalfa crops irrigated with Alamosa River water. Remediation of the site will help to ensure that no adverse effects occur over the longer term.
