= Idaho Springs, Colorado =

City in Colorado

- Statutory City
- City of Idaho Springs
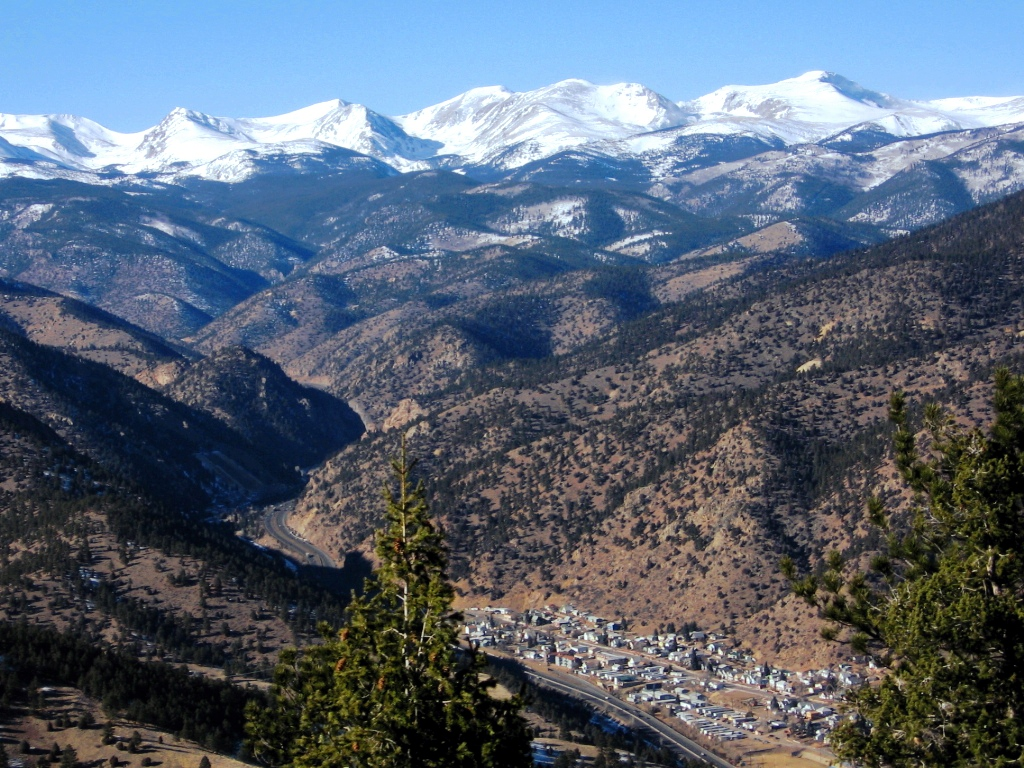
- Aerial view from the east in 2006
- Motto: "Where The Gold Rush Began"
- Location in Clear Creek County, Colorado
- Coordinates: 39°44′48″N 105°28′50″W
- Country: United States
- State: Colorado
- County: Clear Creek County
- City: Idaho Springs
- Founded: 1859
- Incorporated: 1885-11-15

Government
  - Type: Statutory City

Area
  - Total: 2.29 sq mi (5.92 km^{2})
  - Land: 2.25 sq mi (5.83 km^{2})
  - Water: 0.035 sq mi (0.09 km^{2})
- Elevation: 7,526 ft (2,294 m)

Population (2020)
  - Total: 1,782
- Time zone: UTC−7 (MST)
  - Summer (DST): UTC−6 (MDT)
- ZIP Code: 80452
- Area codes: 303 and 720
- FIPS code: 08-38370
- GNIS feature ID: 204710
- Website: www.idahospringsco.com

Idaho Springs is a statutory city in Clear Creek County, Colorado, United States. Located in Clear Creek Canyon in the mountains upstream from Golden, it lies some 30 miles (50 km) west of Denver.

As of the 2020 United States census, Idaho Springs had a population of 1,782, making it the most populous municipality in the county.

Founded in 1859 by prospectors during the early days of the Pike's Peak Gold Rush, the town was at the center of the region's mining district throughout the late nineteenth century. The Argo Tunnel drained and provided access to many lodes of ore between Idaho Springs and Central City. During the late twentieth century, the town evolved into a tourist center along U.S. Highway 6 and U.S. Highway 40, which ascend Clear Creek Canyon through the historic mining district.

The town today is squeezed along the north side of Interstate 70, with a historical downtown in the central portion, a strip of tourist-related businesses on its eastern end, and mostly residences on its western end. It also serves as a bedroom community for workers at the Loveland Ski Area farther up the canyon. The town today is the largest community in Clear Creek County, but, for historical reasons, the county seat has remained at Georgetown.

== History ==
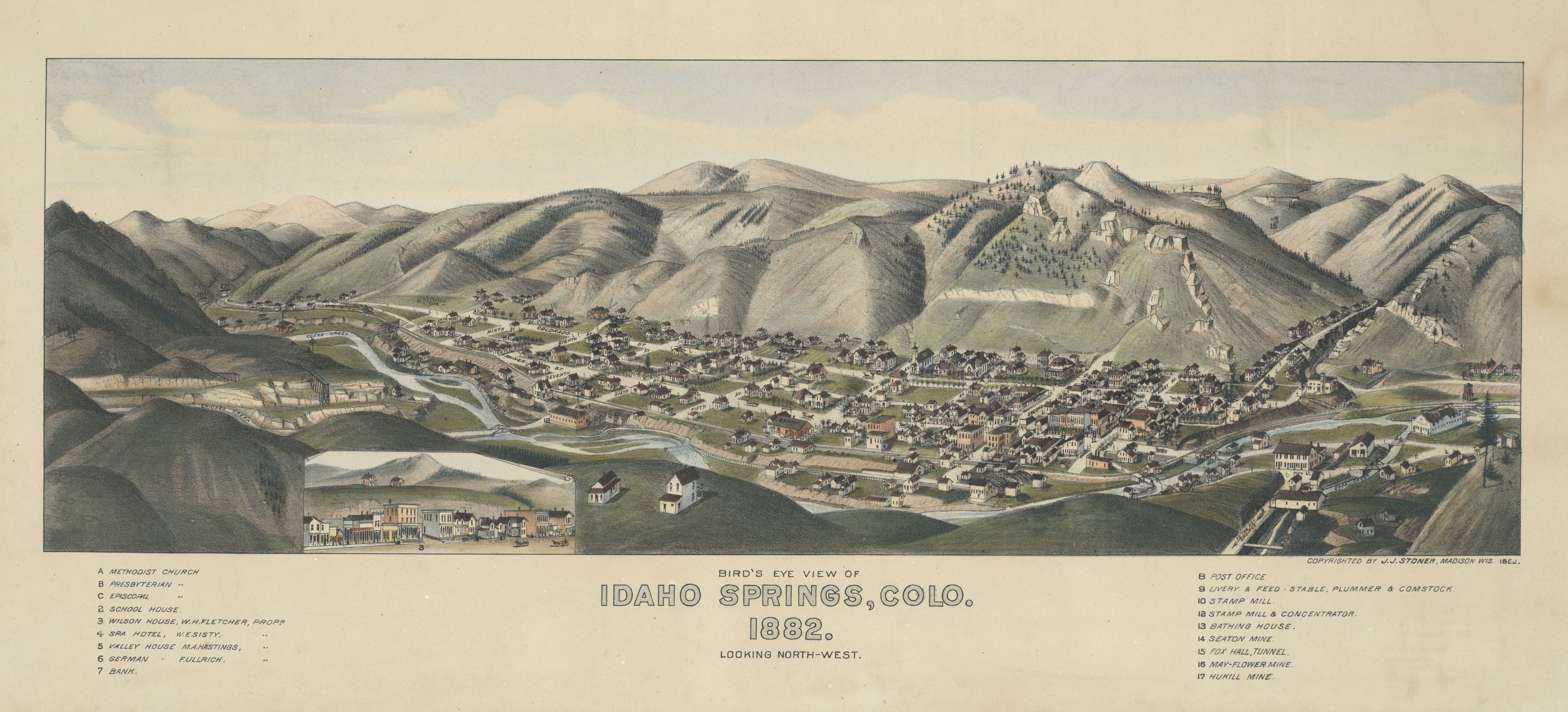
Bird's eye view of Idaho Springs Colorado, 1882

On January 5, 1859, during the Colorado gold rush, prospector George A. Jackson discovered placer gold at the present site of Idaho Springs, where Chicago Creek empties into Clear Creek. It was the first substantial gold discovery in Colorado. Jackson, a Missouri native with experience in the California gold fields, was drawn to the area by clouds of steam rising from some nearby hot springs. Jackson kept his find secret for several months, but after he paid for some supplies with gold dust, others rushed to Jackson's diggings. The location was originally known as "Jackson's Diggings". Once the location became a permanent settlement, it was variously called "Sacramento City", "Idahoe", "Idaho", "Idaho City", and finally "Idaho Springs".

The first placer discoveries were soon followed by discoveries of gold veins in the rocks of the canyon walls on both sides of Clear Creek. Hard rock mining became the mainstay of the town long after the gold-bearing gravels were exhausted.

The Idaho Springs miners' strike of 1903 demanding an eight-hour day erupted into violence in May 1903. This was a conflict was a part the much broader Colorado Labor Wars, where the Western Federation of Miners sought to pressure mining companies into improving conditions for miners.

The 1969 film Downhill Racer portrayed an alpine ski racer from Idaho Springs, played by Robert Redford; a brief scene was shot on location in Idaho Springs. Several scenes from the comedy film The Overbrook Brothers were filmed here in the spring of 2008.

== Geography ==
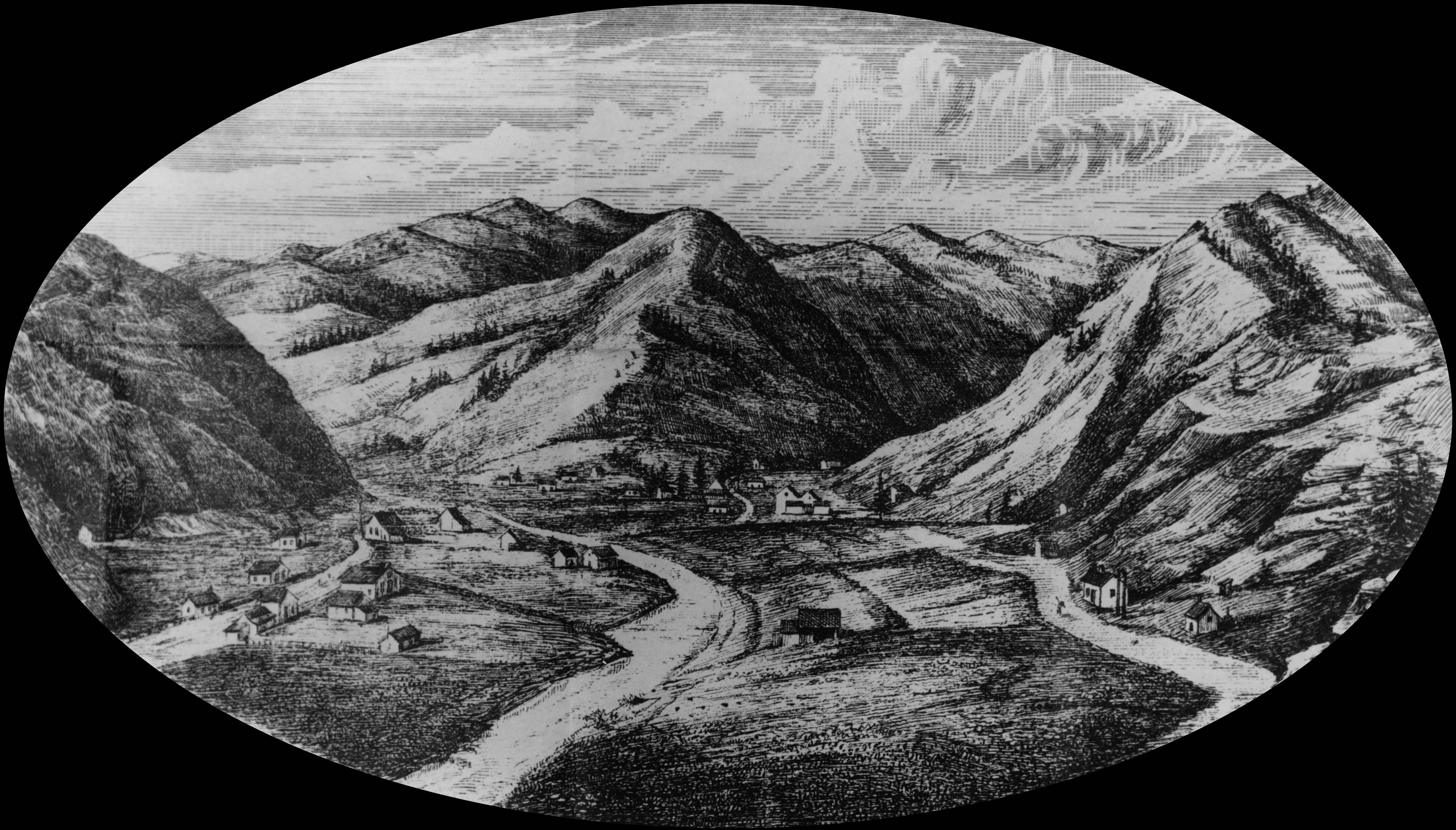
Reproduction of ink rendering; shows Idaho Springs, Clear Creek County, Colorado.

Idaho Springs is located in northeastern Clear Creek County along Clear Creek near the confluence of its tributary, Chicago Creek.

According to the United States Census Bureau, the city has a total area of 2.2 square miles (5.7 km^{2}), of which 0.03 square miles (0.09 km^{2}), or 1.53%, is water.

=== Climate ===
Idaho Springs has a humid continental climate (Koppen: Dfb) with moderately cold winters and warm summers with cool nights. Annual snowfall is heavy, averaging 72 inches (183 cm).

Idaho Springs is notable for having relatively even levels of precipitation between all months. An average of 40 inches of precipitation fall each year.

Climate data for Idaho Springs, Colorado (Elevation 7,555ft)
Month	Jan	Feb	Mar	Apr	May	Jun	Jul	Aug	Sep	Oct	Nov	Dec	Year
Record high °F (°C)	62 (17)	67 (19)	73 (23)	78 (26)	89 (32)	95 (35)	93 (34)	91 (33)	92 (33)	83 (28)	73 (23)	66 (19)	95 (35)
Mean daily maximum °F (°C)	38.8 (3.8)	40.9 (4.9)	45.5 (7.5)	53.6 (12.0)	62.1 (16.7)	72.8 (22.7)	77.4 (25.2)	76.1 (24.5)	69.8 (21.0)	59.3 (15.2)	47.3 (8.5)	39.9 (4.4)	57.0 (13.9)
Mean daily minimum °F (°C)	15.1 (−9.4)	16.0 (−8.9)	19.8 (−6.8)	27.0 (−2.8)	34.4 (1.3)	41.8 (5.4)	47.6 (8.7)	46.4 (8.0)	39.1 (3.9)	30.4 (−0.9)	22.3 (−5.4)	16.5 (−8.6)	29.7 (−1.3)
Record low °F (°C)	−32 (−36)	−29 (−34)	−23 (−31)	−6 (−21)	8 (−13)	23 (−5)	28 (−2)	28 (−2)	14 (−10)	−5 (−21)	−21 (−29)	−24 (−31)	−32 (−36)
Average precipitation inches (mm)	0.33 (8.4)	0.50 (13)	0.90 (23)	1.78 (45)	1.94 (49)	1.50 (38)	2.59 (66)	2.05 (52)	1.36 (35)	0.99 (25)	0.64 (16)	0.47 (12)	15.05 (382)
Average snowfall inches (cm)	5.4 (14)	8.5 (22)	12.3 (31)	15.1 (38)	5.2 (13)	0.4 (1.0)	0 (0)	0 (0)	1.9 (4.8)	7.4 (19)	8.6 (22)	7.2 (18)	72.0 (183)
Source: The Western Regional Climate Center

== Demographics ==
Historical population
Census	Pop.	Note	%±
1870	229		—
1880	733		220.1%
1890	1,338		82.5%
1900	2,502		87.0%
1910	2,154		−13.9%
1920	1,192		−44.7%
1930	1,207		1.3%
1940	2,112		75.0%
1950	1,769		−16.2%
1960	1,480		−16.3%
1970	2,003		35.3%
1980	2,077		3.7%
1990	1,834		−11.7%
2000	1,889		3.0%
2010	1,717		−9.1%
2020	1,782		3.8%
U.S. Decennial Census

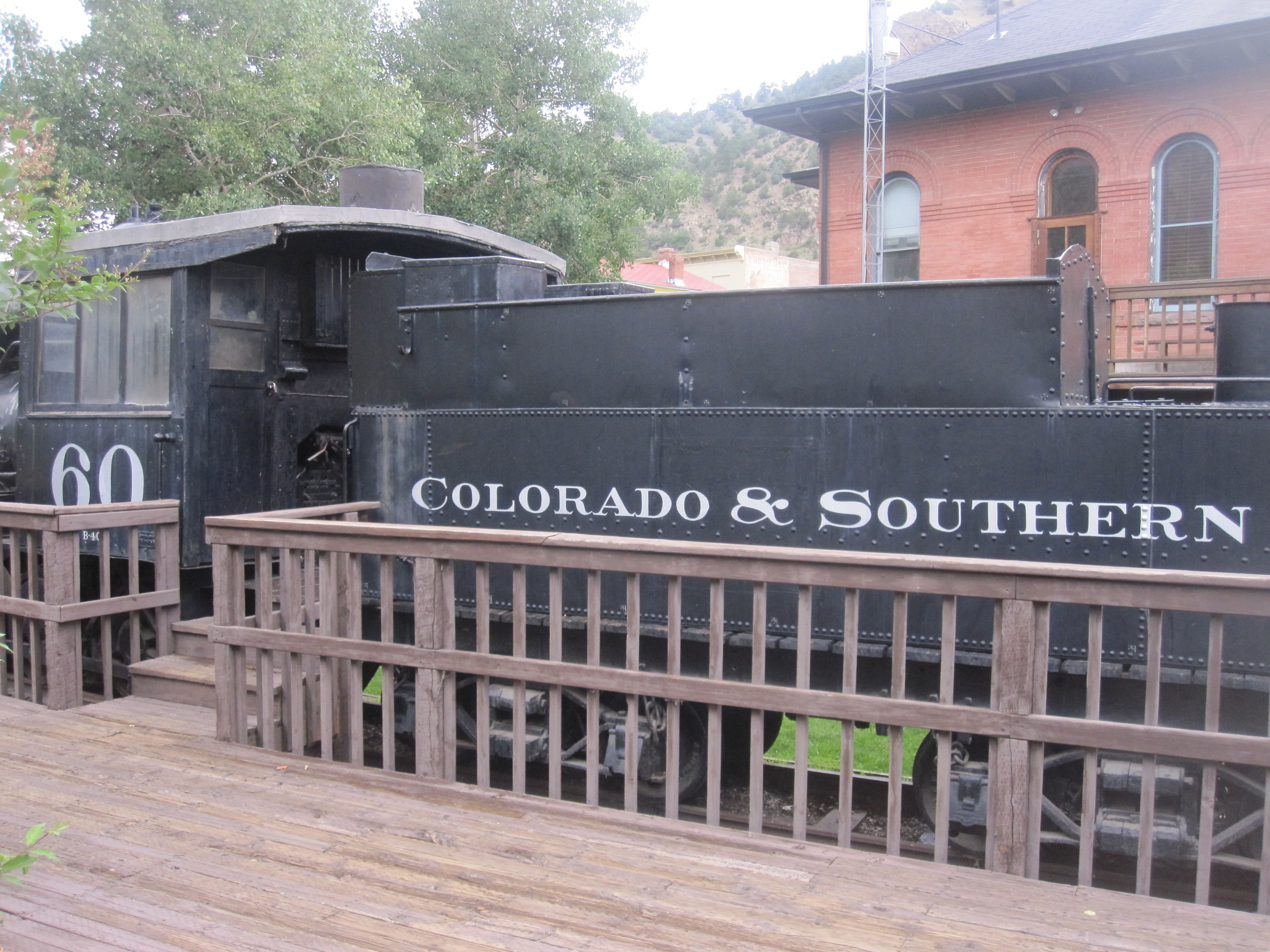
Colorado and Southern Railroad locomotive on exhibit in Idaho Springs

=== 2020 census ===
As of the 2020 census, Idaho Springs had a population of 1,782. The median age was 44.0 years. 15.0% of residents were under the age of 18 and 19.2% of residents were 65 years of age or older. For every 100 females there were 107.5 males, and for every 100 females age 18 and over there were 108.7 males age 18 and over.

0.0% of residents lived in urban areas, while 100.0% lived in rural areas.

There were 865 households in Idaho Springs, of which 20.6% had children under the age of 18 living in them. Of all households, 35.3% were married-couple households, 29.2% were households with a male householder and no spouse or partner present, and 25.1% were households with a female householder and no spouse or partner present. About 38.6% of all households were made up of individuals and 12.9% had someone living alone who was 65 years of age or older.

There were 936 housing units, of which 7.6% were vacant. The homeowner vacancy rate was 0.9% and the rental vacancy rate was 5.8%.

Racial composition as of the 2020 census
Race	Number	Percent
White	1,569	88.0%
Black or African American	22	1.2%
American Indian and Alaska Native	15	0.8%
Asian	18	1.0%
Native Hawaiian and Other Pacific Islander	2	0.1%
Some other race	48	2.7%
Two or more races	108	6.1%
Hispanic or Latino (of any race)	125	7.0%

== Education ==
Idaho Springs Public Schools are part of the Clear Creek School District RE-1. There are two elementary schools, one middle school, one high school, and one charter school. Students attend Clear Creek High School.

Carlson Elementary School is located in Idaho Springs.

== Culture ==
Idaho Springs is the birthplace of Colorado-style pizza.

== Transportation ==
Idaho Springs is incorporated into the Colorado Department of Transportation's Bustang network. It is part of the West Line, which connects Denver to Grand Junction.

== In popular culture ==
Beaus of Holly, a -TV Christmas movie produced in 2020 for the Ion Channel, was filmed in Idaho Springs. The fictional mining town of Haven Springs in the video game Life Is Strange: True Colors is inspired by Idaho Springs.

== Notable people ==
- Gus Alberts, Major League Baseball player
- Joseph H. August, cinematographer
- Warren A. Haggott, U.S. Representative from Colorado
- Paul M. Lewis, entrepreneur and car builder
- Pete Morrison, silent western film actor
- Haleigh Washington, Olympic Gold medalist in Women's Volleyball at the 2020 Summer Olympics
- Jennifer Whalen, professional mountain bike racer
- Elsie Eaves, first female member of the ASCE, civil and cost engineer

== Points of interest ==
- Argo Gold Mine and Mill – The mill and museum are open for tours.
- Statue of cartoon character Steve Canyon
- The Charlie Taylor Water Wheel – a water wheel built by miner Charlie Taylor in 1893 to power a stamp mill. Moved to its present location south of US 6 and US 40 in 1948 and restored in 1988. Fed by city water, there is water fall, referred to as Bridal Veil Falls, visible to the south of eastbound I-70.
- Mount Blue Sky – a 14,266-foot (4,348 m) mountain located about 28 miles south of Idaho Springs.
- Indian Hot Springs

== See also ==
- Arapaho National Forest
- Front Range Urban Corridor
- Pike's Peak Gold Rush
