= Elkton, Colorado =

Elkton
- Town
- Etymology: Elk
- Interactive map of Elkton
- Coordinates: 38°43′20″N 105°09′02″W
- Country: United States
- State: Colorado
- County: Teller County

Elkton is an extinct town in Teller County, Colorado, United States. The GNIS classifies it as a populated place.

A post office called Elkton was established in 1895, and remained in operation until 1926. The community was named for the abundance of elk.
