= Alamosa River =

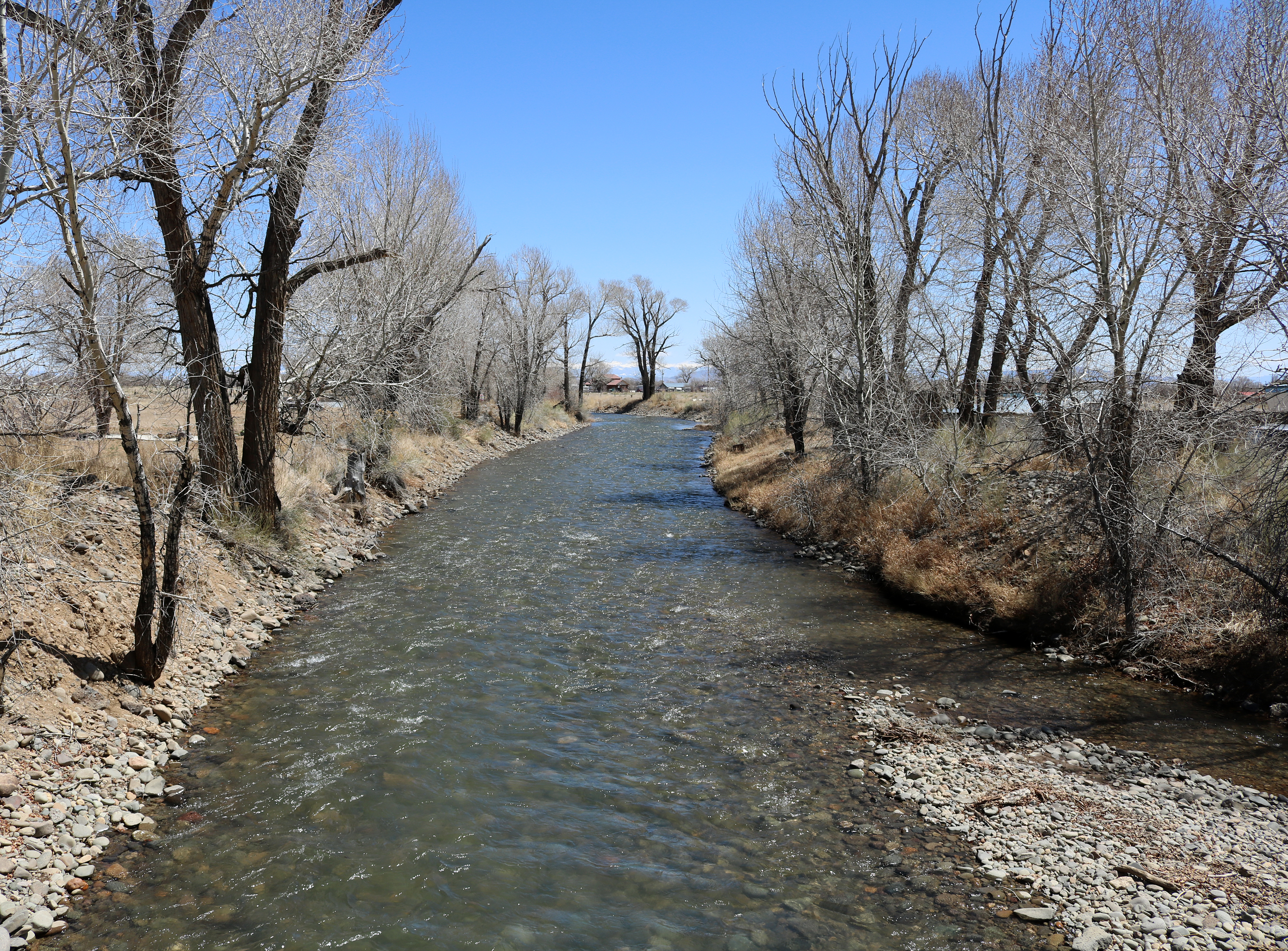
- The river at Capulin.
- Etymology: "of cottonwood"

Location
- Country: United States
- State: Colorado

Physical characteristics
- Source
  - coordinates: 37°21′44″N 106°37′12″W
- Mouth: Rio Grande
  - location: arid land south of Alamosa
  - coordinates: 37°23′54″N 106°50′20″W
- Length: 64 mi (103 km), west-east
- Basin size: 148 mi^{2} (380 km^{2})

The Alamosa River is a river in the southern part of the U.S. state of Colorado. It is about 64 miles (103 km) long, flowing roughly east through the San Luis Valley. Its watershed comprises about 148 square miles (380 km^{2}).

The river's name means "shaded with cottonwoods" in Spanish.

The river was affected by the Summitville mine disaster, the worst cyanide spill in United States history.

== See also ==
- List of rivers in Colorado
- List of tributaries of the Rio Grande
