= National Register of Historic Places listings in Lake County, Colorado =

Location of Lake County in Colorado

This is a list of the National Register of Historic Places listings in Lake County, Colorado.

This is intended to be a complete list of the properties and districts on the National Register of Historic Places in Lake County, Colorado, United States. The locations of National Register properties and districts for which the latitude and longitude coordinates are included below, may be seen in an online map.

There are 11 properties and districts listed on the National Register in the county.

This National Park Service list is complete through NPS recent listings posted October 2, 2026.

== Current listings ==
| | Name on the Register | Image | Date listed | Location | City or town | Description |
|---|---|---|---|---|---|---|
| 1 | Carbonate Hill Steam Plant | | October 2, 2026 (#100013479) | 200 Toledo Ave; 39°14′38″N 106°17′05″W | Leadville vicinity | |
| 2 | Derry Mining Site Camp | Derry Mining Site Camp | July 14, 2000 (#00000782) | West of U.S. Highway 24; 39°07′24″N 106°20′37″W | Leadville | |
| 3 | Dexter Cabin | Dexter Cabin | August 25, 1970 (#70000163) | 912 Harrison Ave. 39°15′07″N 106°17′17″W | Leadville | |
| 4 | Golden Burro Cafe and Lounge | Golden Burro Cafe and Lounge | March 10, 2023 (#100008732) | 710 Harrison Ave. 39°15′00″N 106°17′32″W | Leadville | |
| 5 | Hayden Ranch Headquarters | Hayden Ranch Headquarters | October 11, 2003 (#03001007) | West of U.S. Highway 24; 39°07′41″N 106°18′55″W | Leadville | |
| 6 | Healy House | Healy House | August 25, 1970 (#70000164) | 912 Harrison Ave. 39°15′08″N 106°17′18″W | Leadville | |
| 7 | Interlaken Resort District | Interlaken Resort District | August 7, 1974 (#74000587) | East of Twin Lakes off State Highway 82; 39°04′39″N 106°20′49″W | Twin Lakes | Located across the Twin Lakes from Colorado Route 82; public access only via hiking trail. |
| 8 | Leadville Historic District | Leadville Historic District | October 15, 1966 (#66000248) | Town of Leadville; 39°14′39″N 106°13′42″W | Leadville | |
| 9 | Leadville National Fish Hatchery | Leadville National Fish Hatchery | May 29, 1980 (#80000908) | West of Leadville; 39°13′31″N 106°23′32″W | Leadville | |
| 10 | Matchless Mine | Matchless Mine | December 28, 2010 (#10001088) | East 7th Road; 39°15′22″N 106°16′16″W | Leadville | (Mining Industry in Colorado, MPS) |
| 11 | Twin Lakes District | Twin Lakes District | July 30, 1974 (#74000588) | Both sides of State Highway 82; 39°04′56″N 106°22′56″W | Twin Lakes | |

== See also ==
- List of National Historic Landmarks in Colorado
- List of National Register of Historic Places in Colorado
- Bibliography of Colorado
- Geography of Colorado
- History of Colorado
- Index of Colorado-related articles
- List of Colorado-related lists
- Outline of Colorado
