= Interlaken Fire =

2024 wildfire in Colorado

- Date: June 11, 2024 – June 24, 2024
- Location: Twin Lakes, Colorado
- Coordinates: 39°4′8″N 106°21′2″W

Statistics
- Burned area: 704 acres (3 km^{2})

Ignition
- Cause: Abandoned Campfire, Human Caused

Map
- The fires location in western Colorado

The Interlaken Fire was a wildfire burning near Twin Lakes, Colorado in Lake County, Colorado, United States from June 11 to June 24, 2024. It burned a total of 704 acres (285 ha) and was declared 100% contained on June 24.

== Events ==
=== Cause ===
The fire is believed to have been caused by an unattended campfire.

=== June ===
The Interlake Fire was first reported on June 11, 2024, at around 2:01 pm MDT.

== Closures ==
On June 14, 2024, the United States Forest Service closed the Twin Lakes and several surrounding areas including Twin Lakes day use areas, Dexter Campgroungs and the dispersed camping areas near the Twin Lakes Dam.
