= Interlaken Resort District =

Historic district in Colorado, United States

- Interlaken resort District
- U.S. National Register of Historic Places
- U.S. Historic district
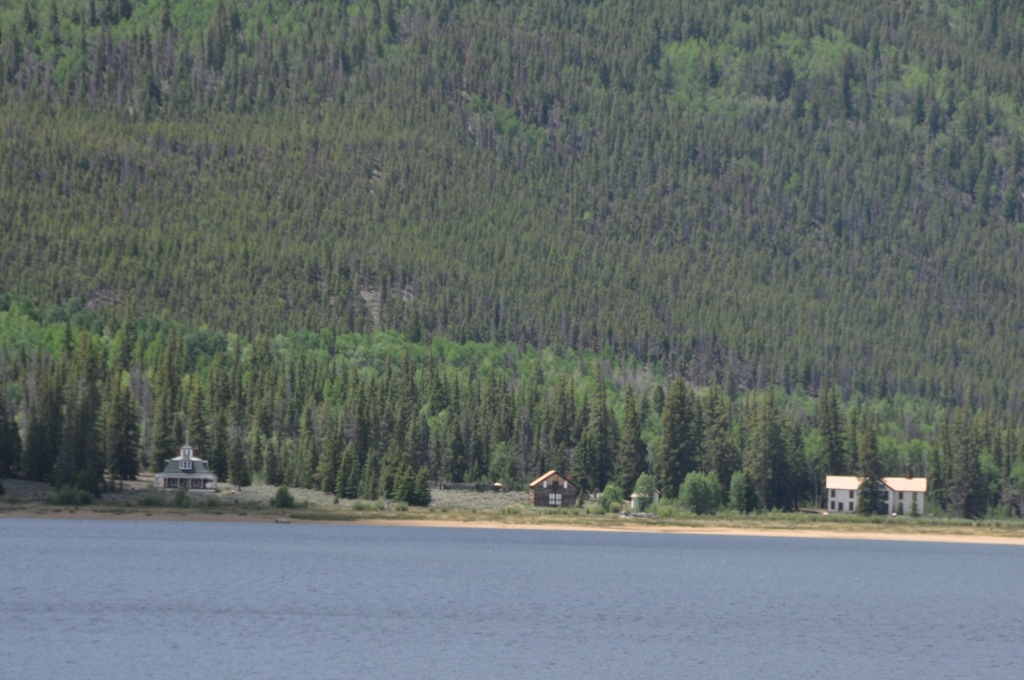

- Location within Colorado Location within the United States
- Location: East of Twin Lakes off State Highway 82
- Coordinates: 39°04′39″N 106°20′49″W
- Area: 11 acres (4.5 ha)
- Built: 1895
- NRHP reference No.: 74000587
- Added to NRHP: August 07, 1974

Interlaken Resort District is located near Twin Lakes, Colorado and was one of the most scenic and most popular resort areas in the mountains of Colorado, in the United States. Located across from the town of Twin Lakes, it began operations in 1879 as a small and unpretentious hotel called the Lakeside Resort on the smaller of the two lakes at the foot of Mount Elbert. In the 1950s, the Twin Lakes were enlarged, and Interlaken was cut off from the town and was only accessible by boat. The hotel closed shortly after the lake was enlarged.

The Interlaken Hotel is a two-story log structure, roughly cruciform in plan, with brick chimneys in the center of its two main wings.

== See also ==
- National Register of Historic Places listings in Lake County, Colorado
