= Hayden Ranch Headquarters =

- Hayden Ranch headquarters
- U.S. National Register of Historic Places
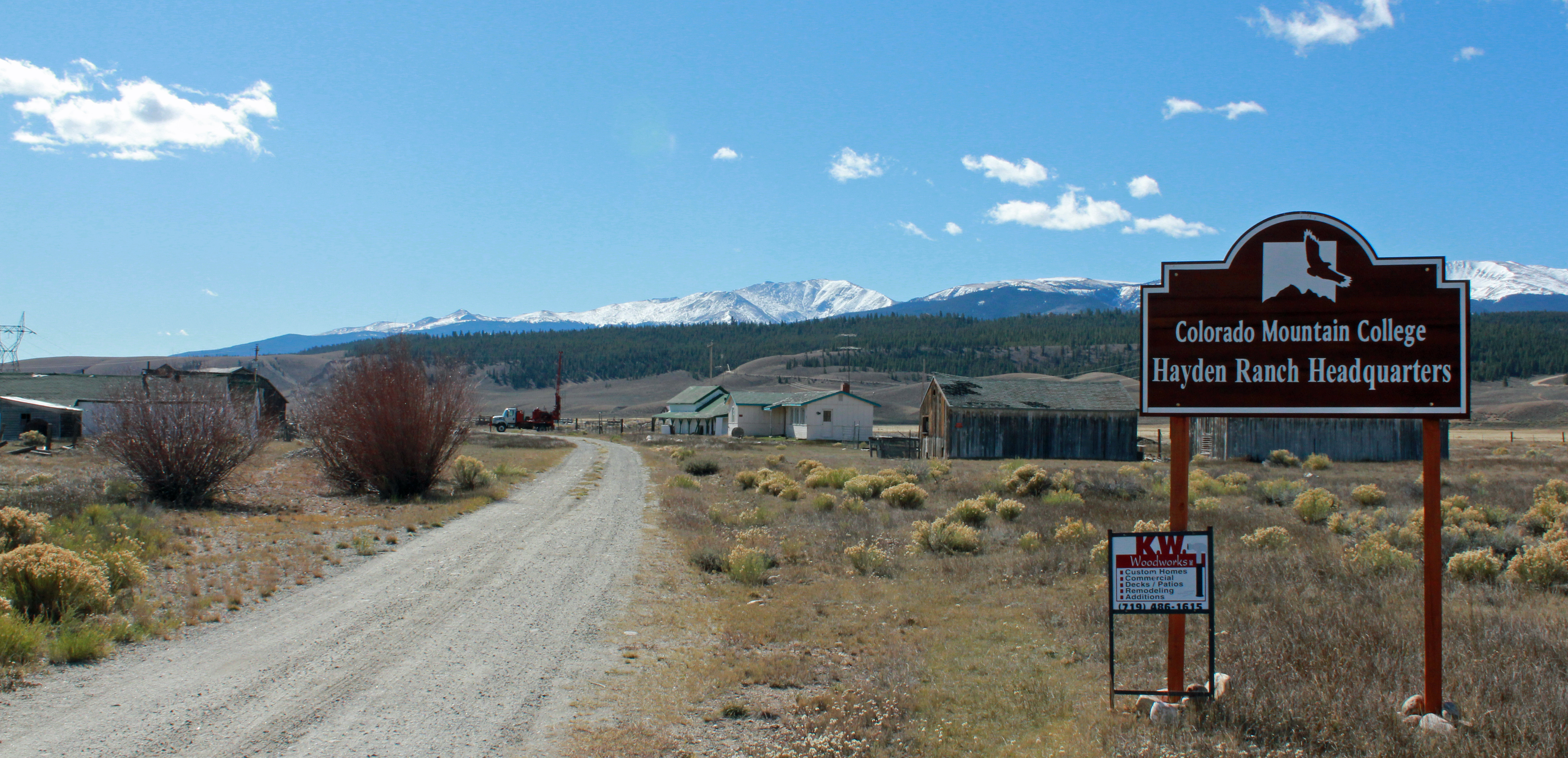

- Location within Colorado Location within the United States
- Location: West of Route 24, Leadville, Colorado
- Coordinates: 39°07′41″N 106°18′45″W
- Area: 35 acres (14 ha)
- Built by: Francis Hayden, John Weir
- Architectural style: log cabin
- NRHP reference No.: 03001007
- Added to NRHP: October 11, 2003

Hayden Ranch Headquarters is located near Leadville, Colorado and is an example of early high country agricultural operations. Colorado Mountain College currently owns the property.

A 35 acres (14 ha) portion of the original ranch was listed on the National Register of Historic Places in 2003. The listing included 16 contributing buildings and a contributing site.

The ranch is at elevation of 9,180 feet (2,800 m). It is located about ten miles south of Leadville and eighteen miles north of Granite, Colorado on U.S. Highway 24, which is also known as the Top of the Rockies State and National Historic and Scenic Byway. It is close to the Derry Mining Site Camp, which is also National Register-listed.

== See also ==
- National Register of Historic Places listings in Lake County, Colorado
