= Rufus Lumry =

The Reverend Rufus Lumry
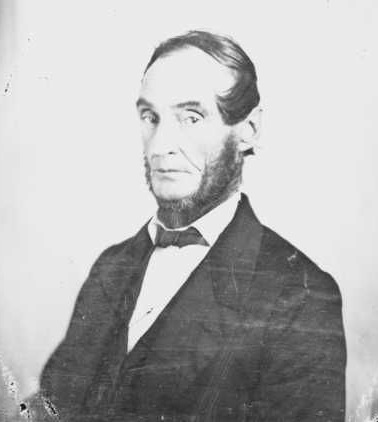
- Born: August 7, 1800; Rensselaerville, New York, United States
- Died: June 21, 1862 (aged 61); Quail Mountain, Chaffee County (then part of Lake County), Colorado, United States
- Occupation: Circuit preacher
- Years active: 1824–1862
- Spouse: Betsey Delamater Lumry (1801 – 1845)
- Children: 4
- Religion: Christian
- Church: Wesleyan Methodist Church (1842 – 1862); Methodist Episcopal Church (c. 1821 – 1842)
- Ordained: October 1, 1837, Jacksonville, Illinois
- Offices held: a founding trustee of Wheaton College and its predecessor, the Illinois Institute (1852 – 1855, 1858 – 1862)

Rufus Lumry (Aug. 7, 1800 (Note: Another source lists his birthdate as July 4, 1799.) – June 21, 1862) was an American circuit preacher and outspoken abolitionist. Ordained as an elder in the Methodist Episcopal Church, then riven by conflict over slavery, Lumry was arraigned before its 1842 Illinois Annual Conference at Chicago for anti-slavery agitation, from which he was asked to desist. He replied that no man or group of men would put a padlock on his lips, and became a leading Illinois organizer of the new, staunchly abolitionist Wesleyan Methodist Church. Lumry unsuccessfully ran for the Illinois General Assembly on the abolitionist Liberty Party ticket in 1844 and helped found Wheaton College and its predecessor, the Illinois Institute in the 1850s and beginning of the 1860s–as well as the former Amity College in College Springs, Iowa. Lumry was a coworker with fellow abolitionists Ichabod Codding and Zebina Eastman. Of him, Owen Lovejoy said, "Lumry is a sharp thrashing instrument, having teeth wherewith the Lord thrasheth slavery."

== Family and Early life ==
Rufus's father's name was likely Andrew, whose surname was spelled differently on virtually every document related to him. He was a carter and a descendant of the French Huguenot refugee André Lamoureux, from whose surname Lumry (Note: Lumry is occasionally spelled Lumery.) is derived. Rufus had at least (Note: Lucius Lumereau (1803 – 1857), born in Albany County, New York, and serving as a wagoner in the War of 1812, may also have been a brother, later residing near Rufus and Enoch in or near Dover, Bureau County, Illinois.) one brother, Enoch, and a sister, Mary.

Rufus's father moved the family to Albany, New York, around 1813, but Rufus did not like city life and returned to his native Rensselaerville to live with his maternal grandfather. He became religious around 1821, give or take a year or two, and joined the Methodist Episcopal Church.

Rufus married Betsey Delamater (1801 – 1845), daughter of John and Mary Eaton Delamater, in Rensselaerville in 1817. They had four children:

- Andrew Lumry (1823 – 1884), a member of the Colorado House of Representatives, elected in 1881
- Maryetta Lumry Thompson (1824 – 1847)
- Oscar Fletcher Lumry (1827 – 1914), Wesleyan Methodist pastor, trustee and professor of Greek and Latin at Wheaton College (Illinois)
- Theron Lumry (1830 – 1897)

== Ministry ==
Rufus was recognized as an exhorter on February 21, 1824, at Knox, New York. Moving to western New York State, he was one of a class of sixteen candidates admitted on trial for ordination by the church's 1828 Genesee Annual Conference at Ithaca and was ordained as a deacon by Bishop Elijah Hedding on July 20, 1832, at Manlius. He is known to have preached in Cortland and on Brakel Creek in Chenango County. He started for Illinois on May 6, 1835, settling at or near Princeton. He was ordained an elder on October 1, 1837, at Jacksonville, (Note: The source lists the location as "Jackson, Ill." However, there is no municipality in Illinois named Jackson, and the 1837 Illinois Annual Conference of the Methodist Episcopal Church was held at Jacksonville, beginning on September 27.) then adopting his ardently anti-slavery stance. A circuit preacher, he is known to have preached in Bureau Township, LaSalle County's Freedom Township, Indian Creek (now LaSalle County's Mission Township), Melugin's Grove (now Compton), Milford, Oswego, Plano, Plattville, Princeton, and Will County's Wilmington, all in Illinois. He preached on the Canton Circuit in the late 1830s and was the founding pastor of a Wesleyan congregation in Wheaton in 1843.

== Burial of James E. Burr ==
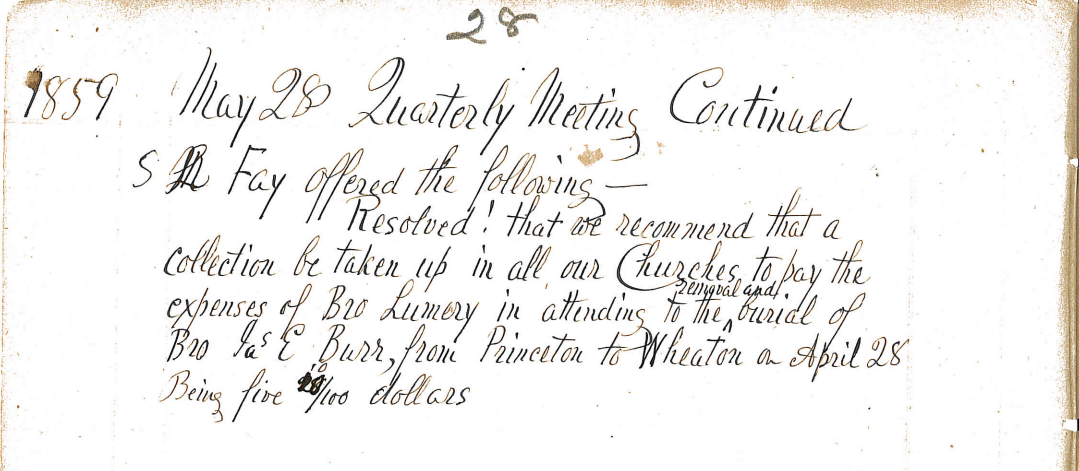
Resolution of the Bureau Circuit of the Wesleyan Methodist Connection to reimburse Lumry for taking Burr's body to Wheaton for burial

Accused of grand larceny for encouraging slaves to escape from Missouri to Illinois, James E. Burr was sentenced to hard labor in Missouri in 1841. Released in 1846 after losing the use of one of his arms, Burr took up residence in Princeton, Illinois, in 1849. In failing health, he reportedly asked Rev. Lumry to see that he be buried in a place where no one who had supported slavery would be buried nearby. When Burr died of consumption in 1859, Lumry took Burr's body to Wheaton, Illinois, for burial on the campus of the Illinois Institute, later renamed Wheaton College. Burr left $300 of his $4,000 estate to the college, which maintains a scholarship for minority students in his name. His grave remains a landmark on campus.

== Later Life, Death, and Burial ==
Rufus moved to Colorado with his son Andrew in 1861. After several months there, late in the fall of that year, he joined a group of twelve carrying provisions to miners in the Rocky Mountains, thought to be starving. As it turned out, the miners had moved onward, and winter set in early, forcing the erstwhile rescue party to remain in the mountains through the winter. Rufus and a man from Iowa were descending from Quail Mountain in the Collegiate Peaks section of the Sawatch Range on June 21, 1862, when Rufus tried to cross Cache Creek on some driftwood, which gave way and trapped him in the frigid meltwater. He died of hypothermia (Note: The most detailed account states that the party never reached the miners because they had moved onward and gives Rufus's cause of death as hypothermia. Other sources claim that the rescue party became trapped in the snow, never reaching where the miners had been, and that Rufus drowned.) and was buried in the nearby Cache Creek Cemetery, serving the now abandoned mining settlement of Cache Creek, (Note: Sometimes incorrectly rendered as "Cash Creek.") later renamed the Granite Cemetery for the nearby community of Granite, Colorado. Like many early graves, its exact location is unknown, and it might have been lost to history had John Lewis Dyer not mentioned it in his memoirs.
