= Twin Lakes District =

Historic district in Colorado, US

- Twin Lakes Historic District
- U.S. National Register of Historic Places
- U.S. Historic district
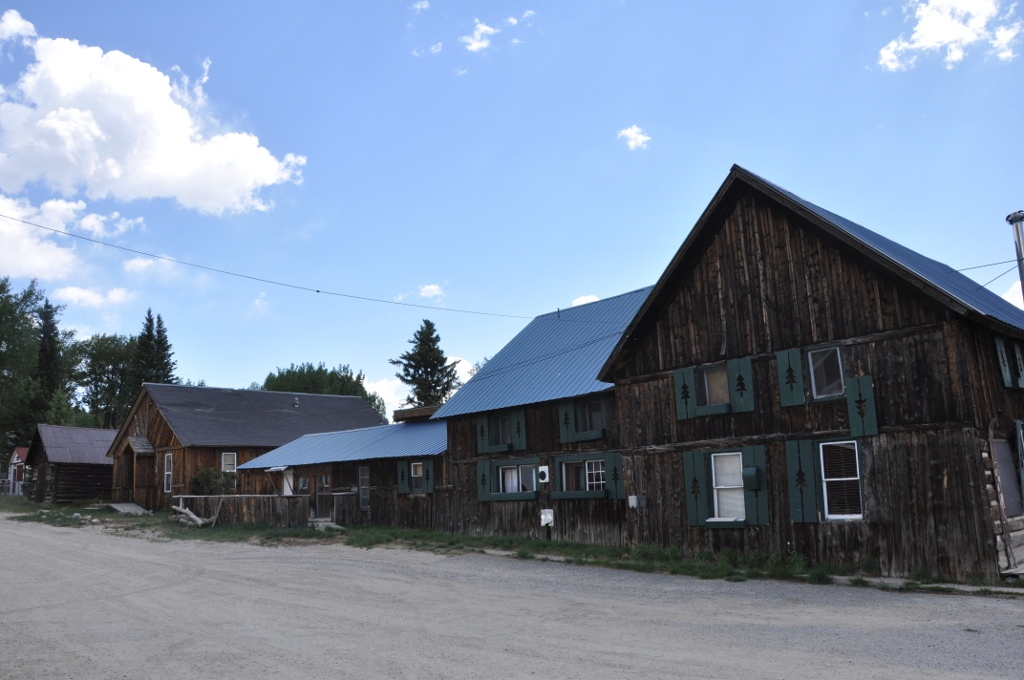

- Location within Colorado Location within the United States
- Location: Lake County, Colorado
- Nearest city: Twin Lakes, Colorado
- Coordinates: 39°04′56″N 106°22′56″W
- Area: 20 acres (8.1 ha)
- Built: 1880s
- NRHP reference No.: 74000588
- Added to NRHP: July 30, 1974

The Twin Lakes Historic District, in Twin Lakes, Lake County, Colorado, is a 20 acres (8.1 ha) historic district which was listed on the National Register of Historic Places in 1974. It included 12 contributing buildings.

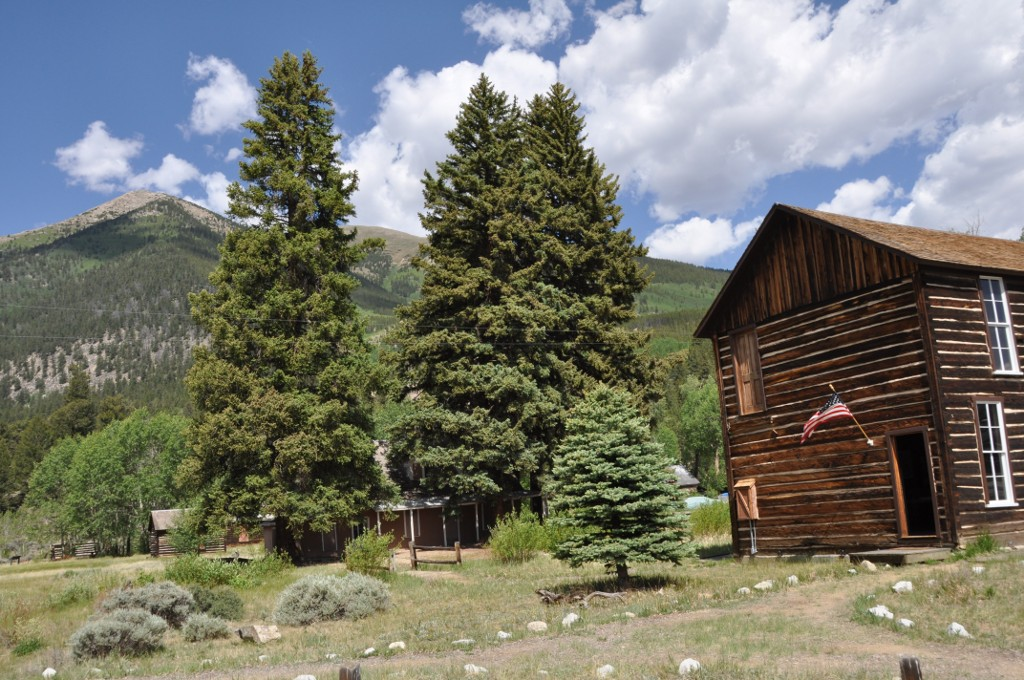
Another view in the district

Its 1974 National Register nomination asserted:

Twin Lakes is perhaps one of the best remaining examples of a mountain village of the late 1800s. Nearly all of the buildings are of log construction and date from the two decades prior to the turn of the century. The town is well cared for by the inhabitants and looks much the same today as it did near the turn of the century....Much of the charm of the village is derived from its unique mountain setting and its groves of aspen and fir trees. The village is constructed entirely of native woods and stone and nestles in a small hollow against the mountains and near the lake.

== See also ==
- National Register of Historic Places listings in Lake County, Colorado
