= Quail Mountain (Colorado) =

Mountain in Colorado, United States

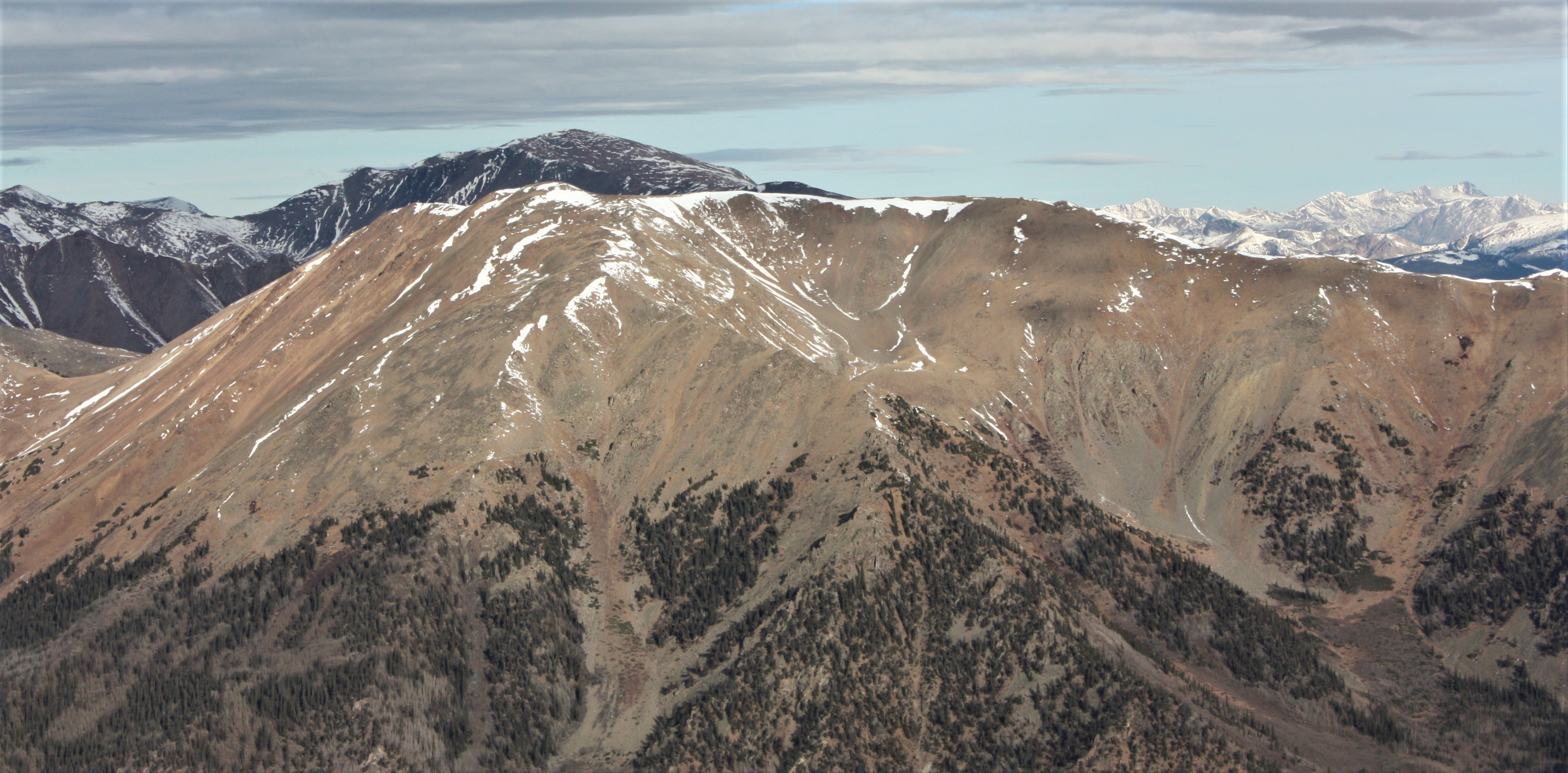
- Southeast aspect, viewed from Mt. Oxford

Highest point
- Elevation: 13,465 ft (4,104 m)
- Prominence: 935 ft (285 m)
- Parent peak: Mount Hope (13,939 ft)
- Isolation: 1.37 mi (2.20 km)
- Coordinates: 39°01′04″N 106°23′41″W

Geography
- Location within Colorado Location within the United States
- Country: United States
- State: Colorado
- County: Chaffee
- Protected area: San Isabel National Forest
- Parent range: Rocky Mountains; Sawatch Range; Collegiate Peaks
- Topo map: USGS Mount Elbert

Climbing
- Easiest route: class 2 hiking

Quail Mountain is a 13,465-foot (4,104 m) mountain summit in Chaffee County, Colorado, United States.

== Description ==
Quail Mountain is set approximately seven miles (11 km) east of the Continental Divide in the Collegiate Peaks which are a subrange of the Sawatch Range. The mountain is located four miles (6.4 km) southwest of Twin Lakes on land managed by San Isabel National Forest. It ranks as the 282nd-highest summit in Colorado. Precipitation runoff from the mountain's south slope drains into Clear Creek, whereas the north slope drains to Lake Creek, and both are tributaries of the Arkansas River. Topographic relief is significant as the summit rises 3,700 feet (1,128 m) above Clear Creek in 1.5 miles (2.4 km). The highest peak in Colorado, Mount Elbert, rises 6.84 miles (11.01 km) to the north-northwest of Quail Mountain. The mountain's toponym has been officially adopted by the United States Board on Geographic Names.

== Climate ==
According to the Köppen climate classification system, Quail Mountain is located in an alpine subarctic climate zone with cold, snowy winters, and cool to warm summers. Due to its altitude, it receives precipitation all year, as snow in winter and as thunderstorms in summer, with a dry period in late spring. Climbers can expect afternoon rain, hail, and lightning from the seasonal monsoon in late July and August.

== Gallery ==
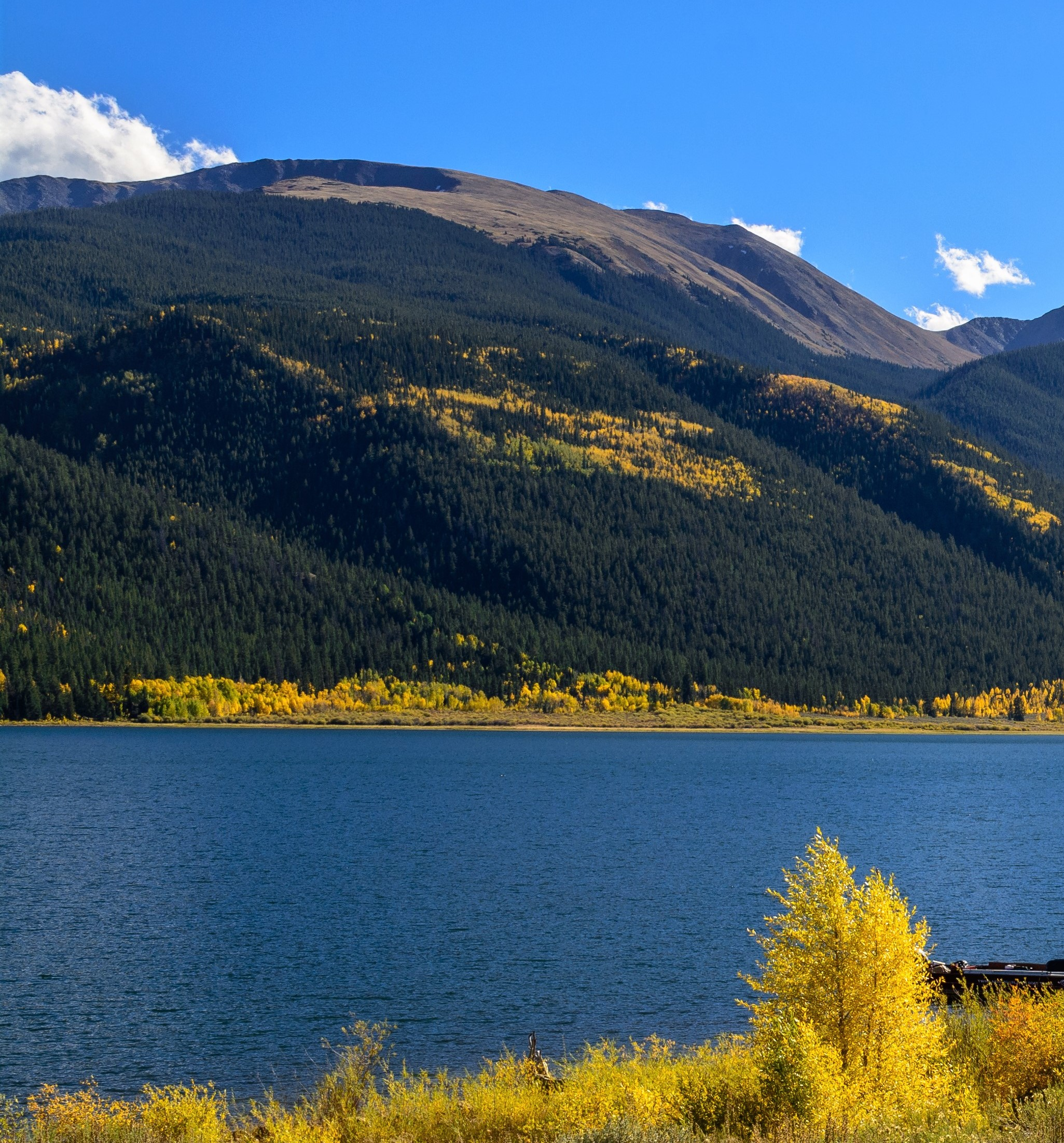
North aspect, viewed from Twin Lakes

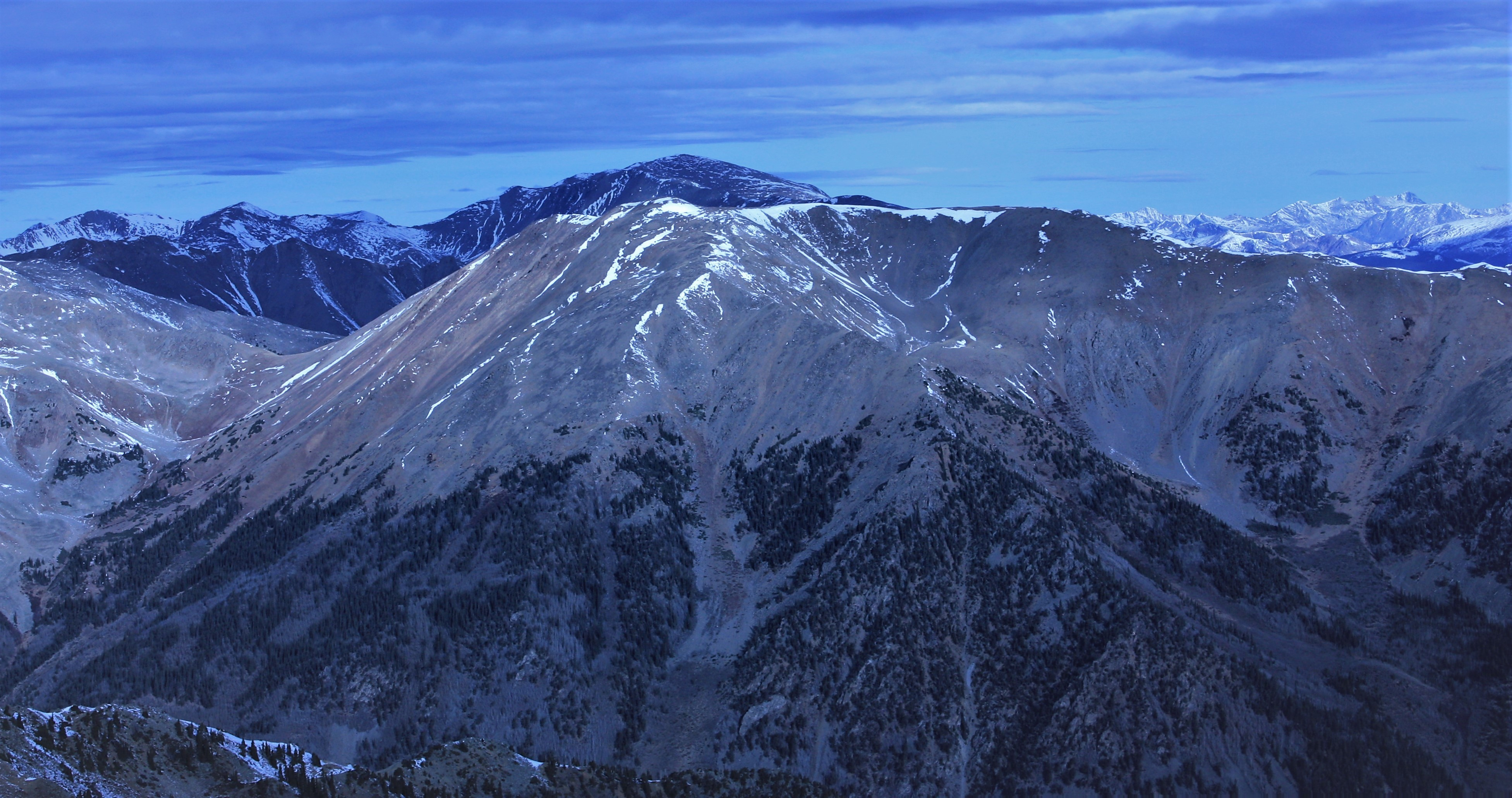
Southeast aspect

== See also ==
- Mountains of Chaffee County, Colorado
- Thirteener
