= Granite, Colorado =

Unincorporated community in Chaffee County, CO, USA

- Unincorporated community
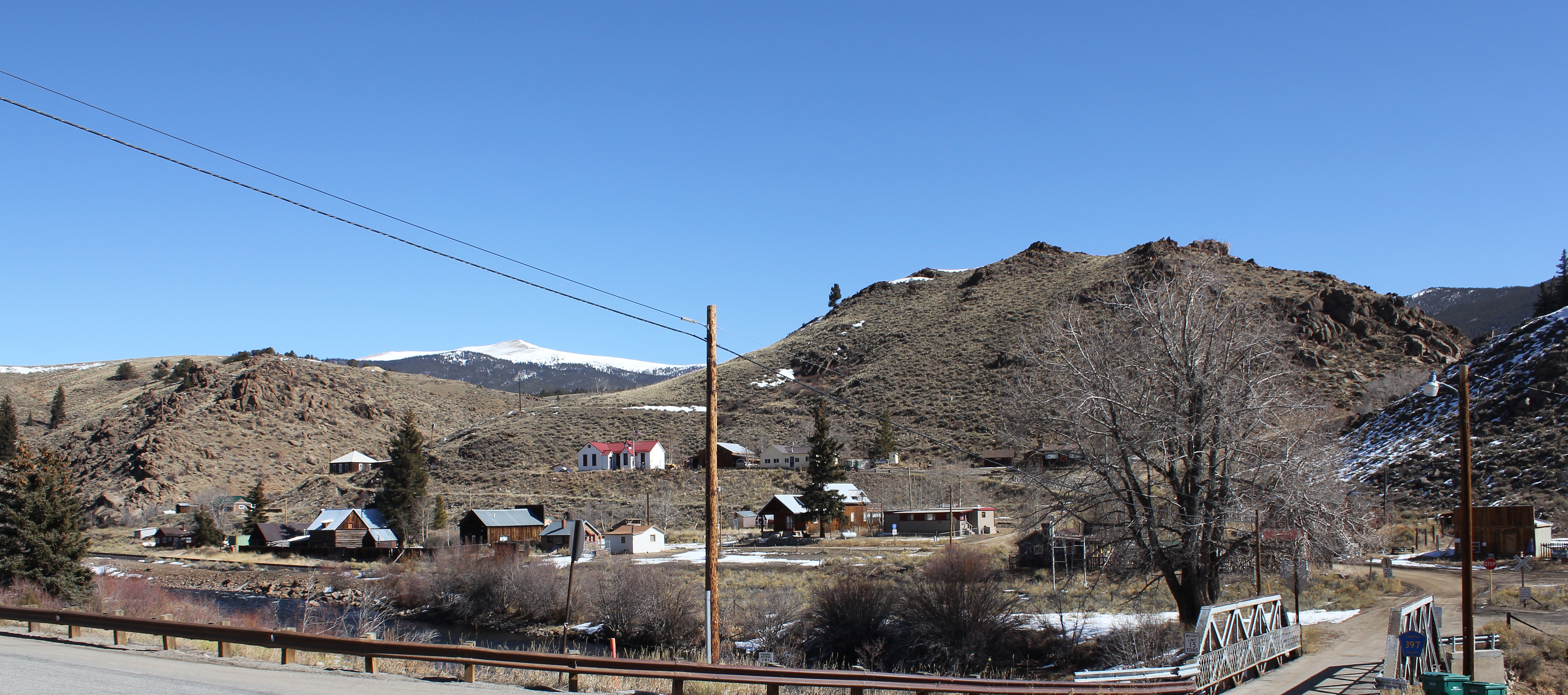
- Granite as viewed from U.S. Route 24, across the Arkansas River.

- Location within the state of Colorado
- Coordinates: 39°02′37″N 106°15′48″W
- Country: United States
- State: Colorado
- Counties: Chaffee
- Elevation: 9,059 ft (2,761 m)

Population (2020)
  - Total: 116
- Time zone: UTC-7 (MST)
  - Summer (DST): UTC-6 (MDT)
- ZIP code: 81228
- GNIS feature ID: 180420

Granite is an unincorporated community with a U.S. Post Office in Chaffee County, Colorado, United States. The zip code of Granite is 81228. According to the 2010 census, the population is 116.

Situated between the Mosquito and the Sawatch mountain ranges, Granite is a high mountain town located on the Arkansas River midway between Leadville to the north, and Buena Vista to the south. It is in close proximity to the second and third highest peaks in the contiguous United States, Mount Elbert and Mount Massive.

The town has a rich history from its days during the Pike's Peak Gold Rush, when it began as a mining camp, holding the county seat. Early prospectors, such as Horace Tabor, were attracted to the area.

== Geography and climate ==
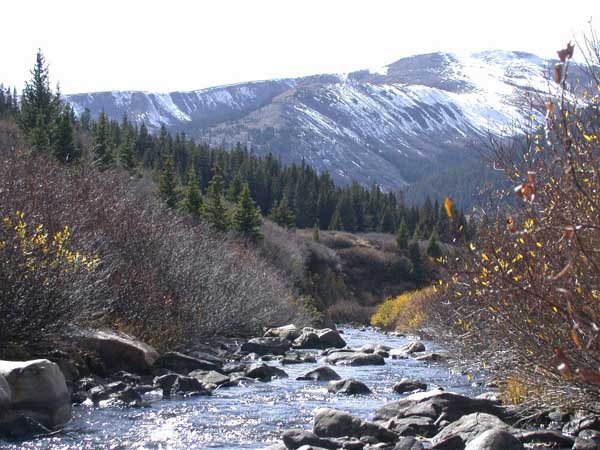
The headwaters of the Arkansas 17 miles north of Granite

Granite is located midway between Leadville to the north, and Buena Vista to the south. The Arkansas River, which once saw extensive placer mining during the Colorado Gold Rush, runs through Granite. It is the sixth longest river in the US; the headwater is 17 miles north in the Leadville area. Granite is located between two mountain ranges: Mosquito Range to the east and the Sawatch Range to the west, and it is within approximately 10 miles of two of the highest peaks in the contiguous United States. To the northwest lies Mount Elbert, the highest of the fourteeners in the Sawatch Range and second highest peak in the contiguous United States. Neighboring Mount Massive is the third highest peak. Nearby Independence Pass, at 12,100 feet (3,687 m), is the highest paved crossing of the Continental Divide in the United States. The elevation, 9,012 ft (2,747 m), brings cool summers and cold winters to the area. Winter temperatures frequently drop to -25 and -30 (USDA zone 4). Surrounded by moisture-robbing mountains, the climate is semiarid, though deep winter snows are common.

== Early history ==
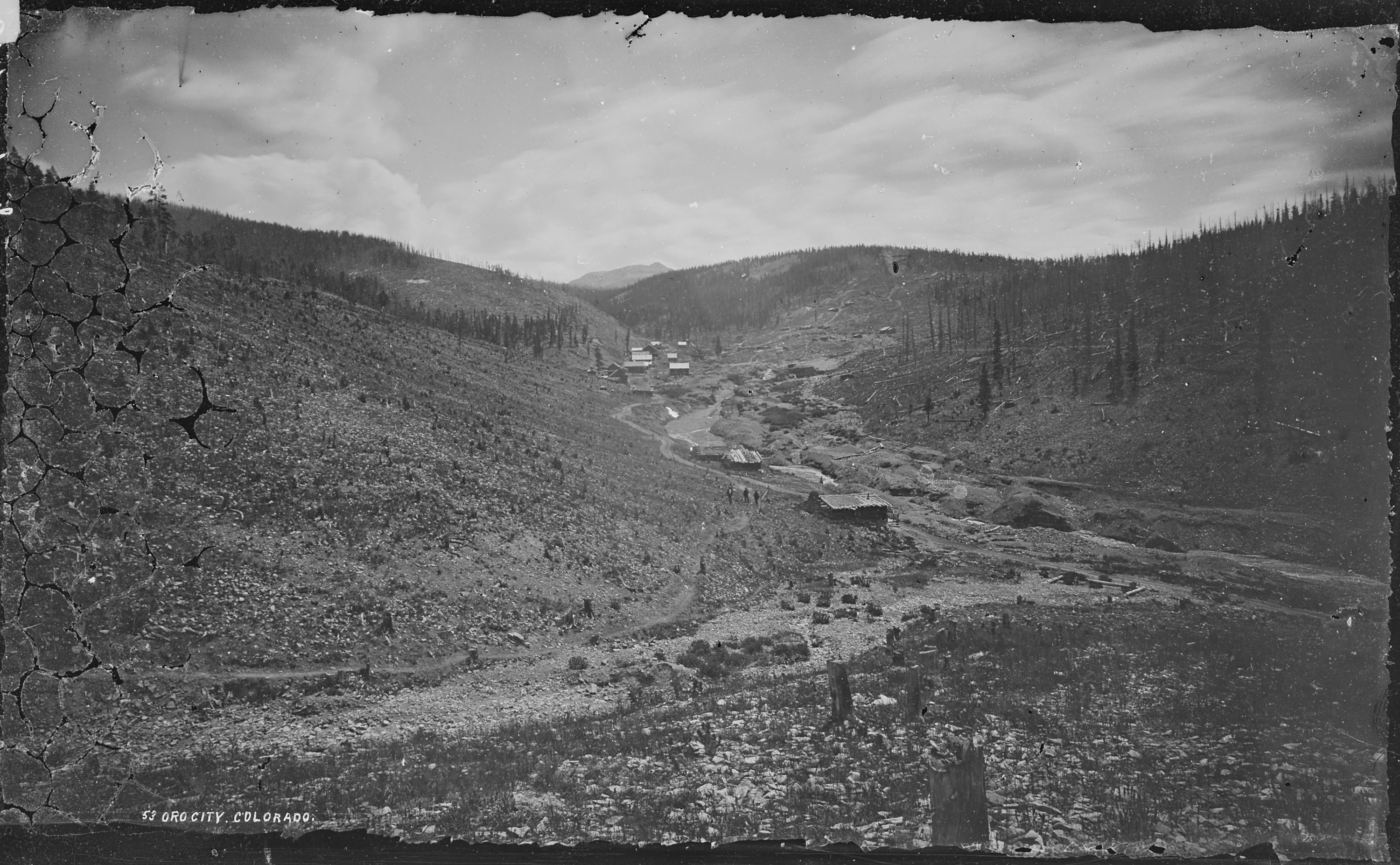
Oro City ~ circa 1874 - 1879

The Pike's Peak Gold Rush that began in 1859 brought an unprecedented number of people into the Colorado Territory. Among the earliest gold discoveries in Colorado were placer deposits near the headwaters of the Arkansas River in Oro city. In 1860, Cache Creek, a mining camp near Granite, became the first settlement of note with a population of about 300, which, by the following year exploded to a population of 3,000. Following the discovery of gold in Low Pass Gulch in 1867, the town of Granite, located on either side of the Arkansas river, attracted many of the miners who previously inhabited the town of Cache Creek. The settlement included a three-mile stretch of river and one mining claim extended two-miles up Cache Creek. In 1867 free quartz gold was discovered and a mill was built. In 1868 the county seat was moved to Granite from the neighboring town of Dayton near present-day Twin Lakes, no longer in existence.

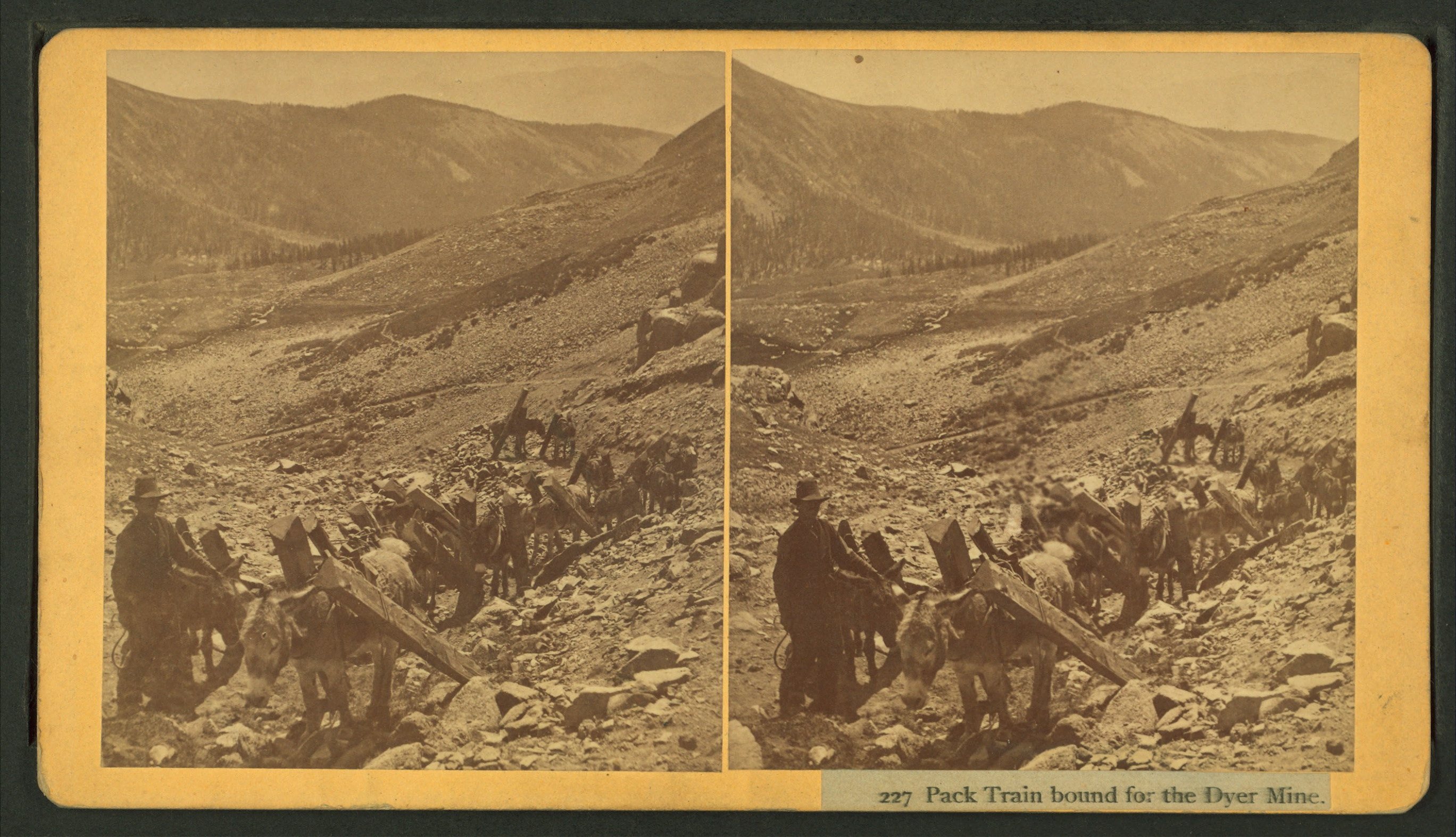
Pack train bound for the Dyer mine

1874 and 1875 brought the "Lake County War", a war involving a group of men from the nearby town of Nathrop known as "The Regulators", to Granite. The war reached its climax when members of the “Committee of Safety” killed Probate Judge Elias Dyer, the son of the well-known minister John Lewis Dyer, in his own courtroom. The vigilante committee had been trying to rid the county of "lawbreakers" using illegal arrests, coerced confessions and forced exile as tools in its campaign. No one was ever convicted of Judge Dyer's murder. Murders were common, but convictions were not. More than one hundred homicides occurred during this period without a single conviction; it was almost impossible to get witnesses to swear to the killings. The early prospectors included Horace Tabor, who later moved up the valley to Leadville where he was to find his fortune in the Colorado Silver Boom that swept Leadville in 1879. In a much-publicized scandal Tabor divorced his wife and married young and beautiful Elizabeth "Baby Doe" McCourt, twenty years his junior. The Tabors had two children, Lily and Silver Dollar. They lost their wealth when the price of silver dropped in 1893 and Tabor died in 1899 with a final request of Baby Doe that she maintain the claim to their silver mine. Baby Doe lived in squalid conditions in the tool shed of the mine for thirty years and was found dead in 1936.

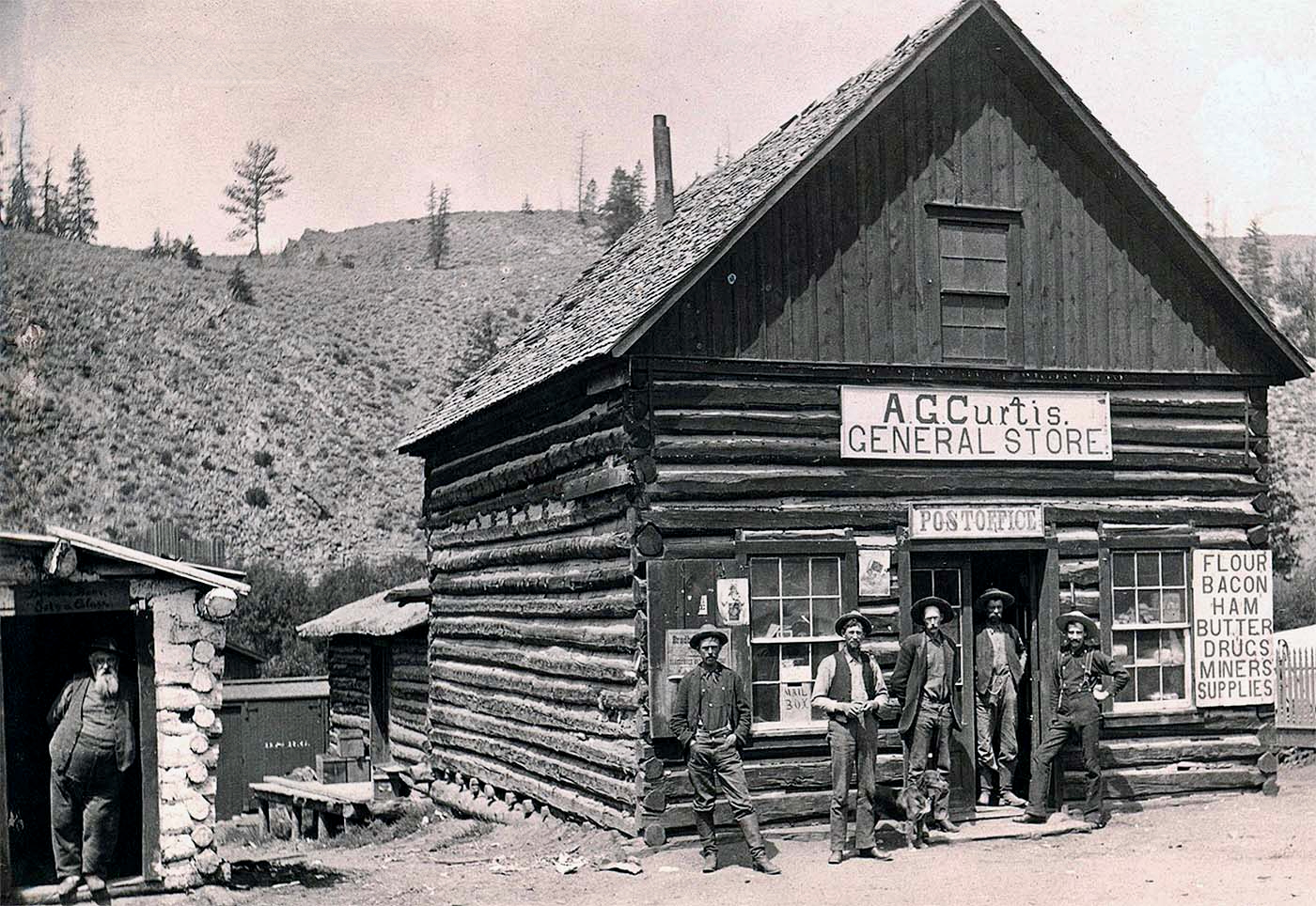
General Store & Post Office, Granite, Colorado ca. 1885.

Until 1879 the village of Granite was located in Lake County, once one of the two largest of the Colorado Territory’s original 17 counties. As the site of some of the richest placer gold strikes in Lake County, Granite held the position of county seat, but in 1878 they lost out to booming silver-rich Leadville, 17 miles to the north. However, Granite did manage to remain the county seat, but not of Lake County. They redrew the county lines creating Chaffee County, with Granite as the county seat. But a year later an election was held resulting in a win for Buena Vista, 17 miles to the south of Granite, with 1,128 votes out of a total population of 1,200 (when women couldn’t vote). Granite declared the election fraudulent and refused to give up its position, so late one night a group of men from Buena Vista took matters into their own hands.

Buena Vistans voted to make their town the county seat, but Granite refused to give up the records. So a group of men led by Ernest Wilbur "borrowed" a locomotive and flat car and went up to Granite late on the night of November 12, 1880. The men built a siding to the Granite Courthouse and kicked in the door. Sheriff John Mear and his wife investigated the noise and were forced at gunpoint to watch the removal of all the county records by the Buena Vista men. Furniture was unbolted from the floor, including the railing. Even the heat stove, with embers remaining in it from the day's use, was loaded onto the flatcar. —Buena Vista Heritage Museum

== Geology and mining ==
Colorado Mineral Belt

The upper Arkansas River valley, including the area around Granite, is hemmed in between high, sheer rock outcroppings of buff/pink-colored Precambrian granite. Granite lies at the center of the Colorado Mineral Belt (CMB), a 50 mile-wide strip that runs north and south for 300 miles. Mineralization of the CMB came primarily by way of intrusions of Tertiary Period magmas. The primary ores of the CMB were generally deposited as mixed metal sulfide mineral veins containing pyrite, galena, sphalerite, chalcopyrite, and gold, silver, and copper. During the last glacial period native gold was freed from the host rock and deposited along the ancient roaring Arkansas River bed - much larger than it is today due to the melting glacial runoff.

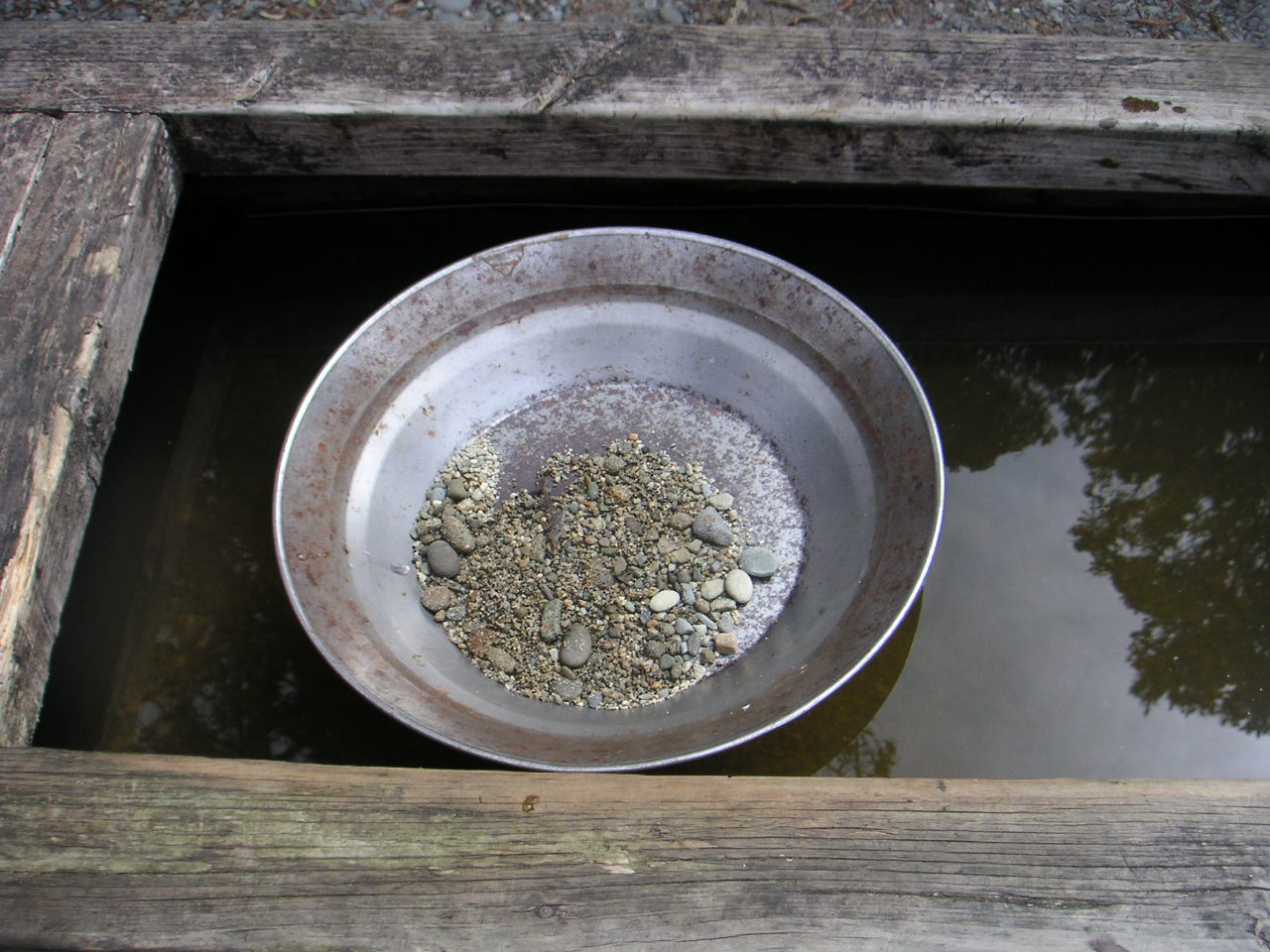
Gold pan

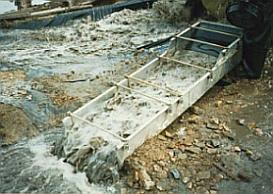
A sluice box used in placer mining

Unlike the early days of the California Gold Rush, very few large nuggets were ever found in the Colorado diggings. A gold pan was adequate for finding "pay dirt", but to produce more than a small amount of gold, sluice boxes were built to separate the gold dust from the gravel. They were built on site from the material that was at hand and placed in the river current. The old sluice boxes were lined with raised obstructions that were placed in a vertical position to the flow of the current and when the gold-laden gravel was shoveled into the upper end of the sluice, the flow of water carried the material down the length of the box. The gravel was carried down the entire length of the sluice and then discharged, but the heavier flakes of gold settled and became trapped. Signs of placer mining up and down along the Arkansas river near Granite and the surrounding areas are in evidence by the many heaps of glacially rounded granite boulders, rocks that were once buried in the glacial gravel deposits.

Among the earliest gold discoveries in the Colorado gold rush were placer deposits discovered in 1859 at the headwaters of the Arkansas River near Granite. By late 1860 most of the streams had been prospected, and numerous gold placers were reported along the Arkansas River to Buena Vista and beyond. The deposits along the Arkansas River and Cache Creek near Granite probably were the most productive, producing about 49,000 troy ounces of gold.

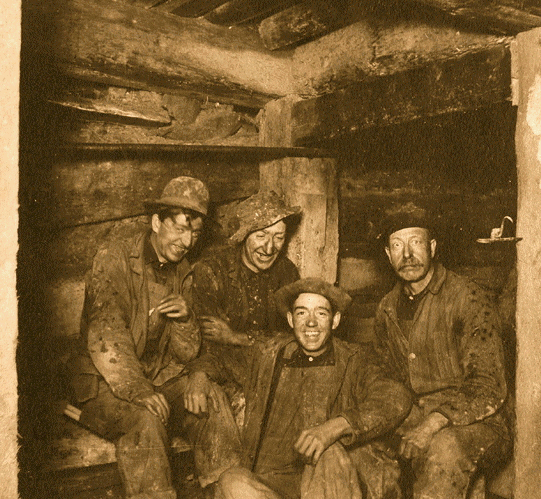
Hard rock miners near Granite, around 1895

In many Colorado mining districts the easily discovered and worked placers were the first big strikes of a typical gold rush. But the free gold supply in stream beds quickly became depleted, and the initial phase was followed by prospecting for veins of lode gold that were the original source of the placer gold. The hills above Granite are pockmarked with numerous old mining tunnels from hard rock mining, evidence of the typical second stage of a gold rush cycle. Their neighbors in Leadville went on to discover silver, resulting in a silver rush, but Granite never got that far. In just a few years their ore began to play out, and the town's population, once as high as 7000, began to decline.

== Stagecoach and railways ==
=== Leadville Stagecoach Road ===
The earliest mode of transportation used by the growing number of settlers in Granite and the surrounding area was horseback and pack mules or burros. The Santa Fe Trail, built in 1822, had a north fork up to Denver (founded in 1858), and by 1877 the Leadville Stagecoach Road was running from Canyon City, through Granite, Leadville, and north to Denver. Reliable transportation was important to deliver supplies for the growing communities, and the route was used more as a supply and mail route than for transportation of passengers. An old schedule from 1880 with the stage stops from Canyon City to Leadville shows that the trip was 126 miles and took 26 (jarring) hours. The distance today is 120 miles, illustrating the fact that in these high mountains the routes for passage are very limited. However, with modern-day transportation the trip now takes only about two hours. The distance to Granite was 108 miles and the fare was $13.50 The Canyon City to Leadville stage ran three times daily.

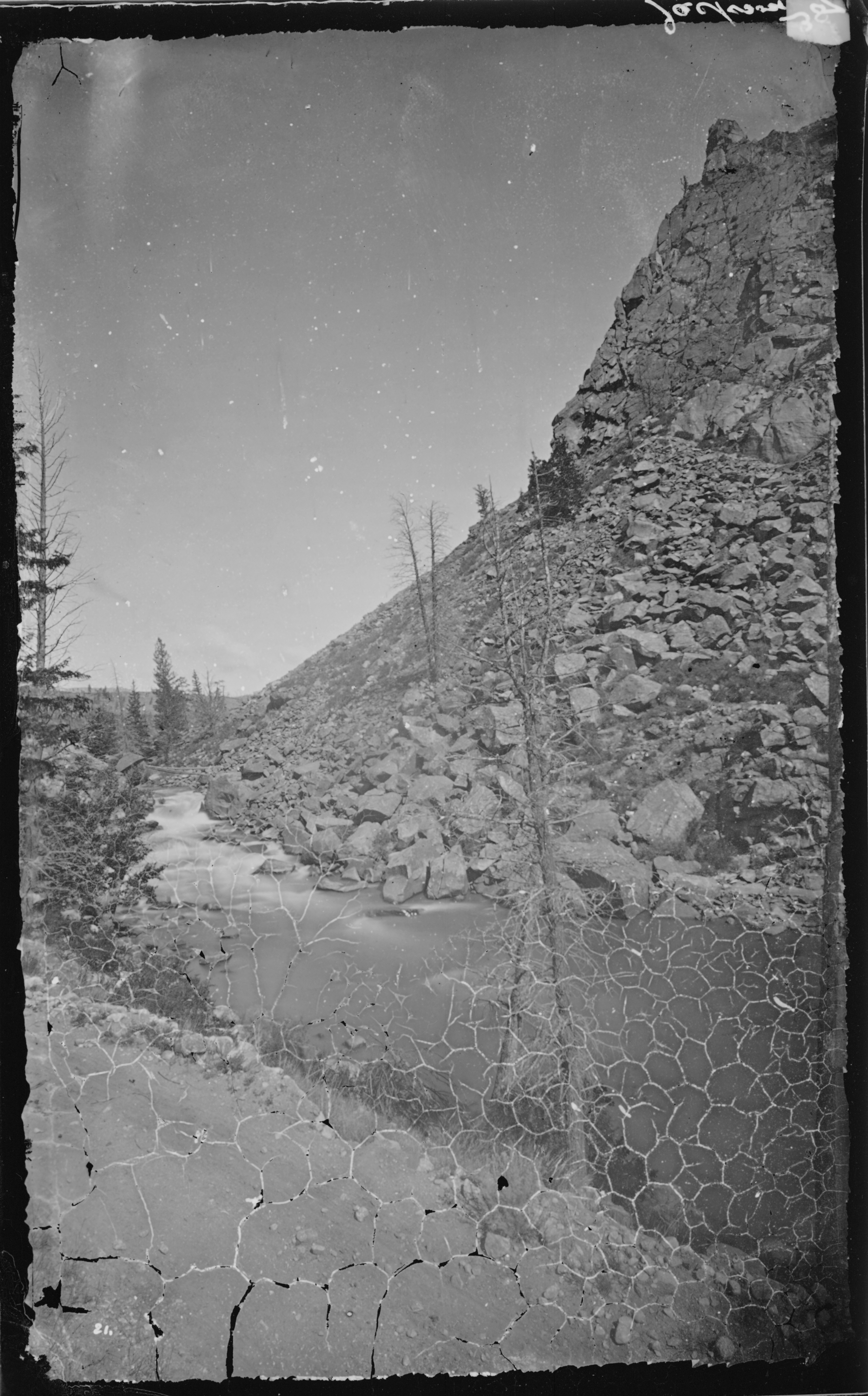
"Arkansas River between the La Plata and Twin Lakes. Chaffee County, Colorado. (1874 - 06/30/1879)"

Traces of the old stage road are still visible, as are the remains of bridges that once crossed the Arkansas River north of Buena Vista near the Colorado Midland Railway tunnels, from east to west at Pine Creek (called "La Plata" in the photo at right), and a final crossing to the east side of the Arkansas just north of Clear Creek, about a mile south of Granite. At low water levels log supports of the rubble-filled abutments can still be seen at the Clear Creek crossing. The photo at right was taken as part of the United States Geological and Geographical Survey of the Territories, the first extensive geological survey of the West. La Plata creek, presently known as Pine Creek, is known to rafters as a dangerous rapids that have taken several lives.

The stage road was built ten to fifteen years before the railroads, and it is likely the heavily engineered rail routes overwhelmed the hand-built stage road. It is uncertain as to whether or not the stage road was abandoned as soon as the railroads reached Leadville, or if the route continued to be used by freight wagons and even early motor cars until better routes were available on the west side of the river where Highway 24 now runs. The stretch of old stage road that runs through Granite is surprisingly well-preserved and is used as a hiking/cycling trail.

=== Denver & Rio Grande Western ===
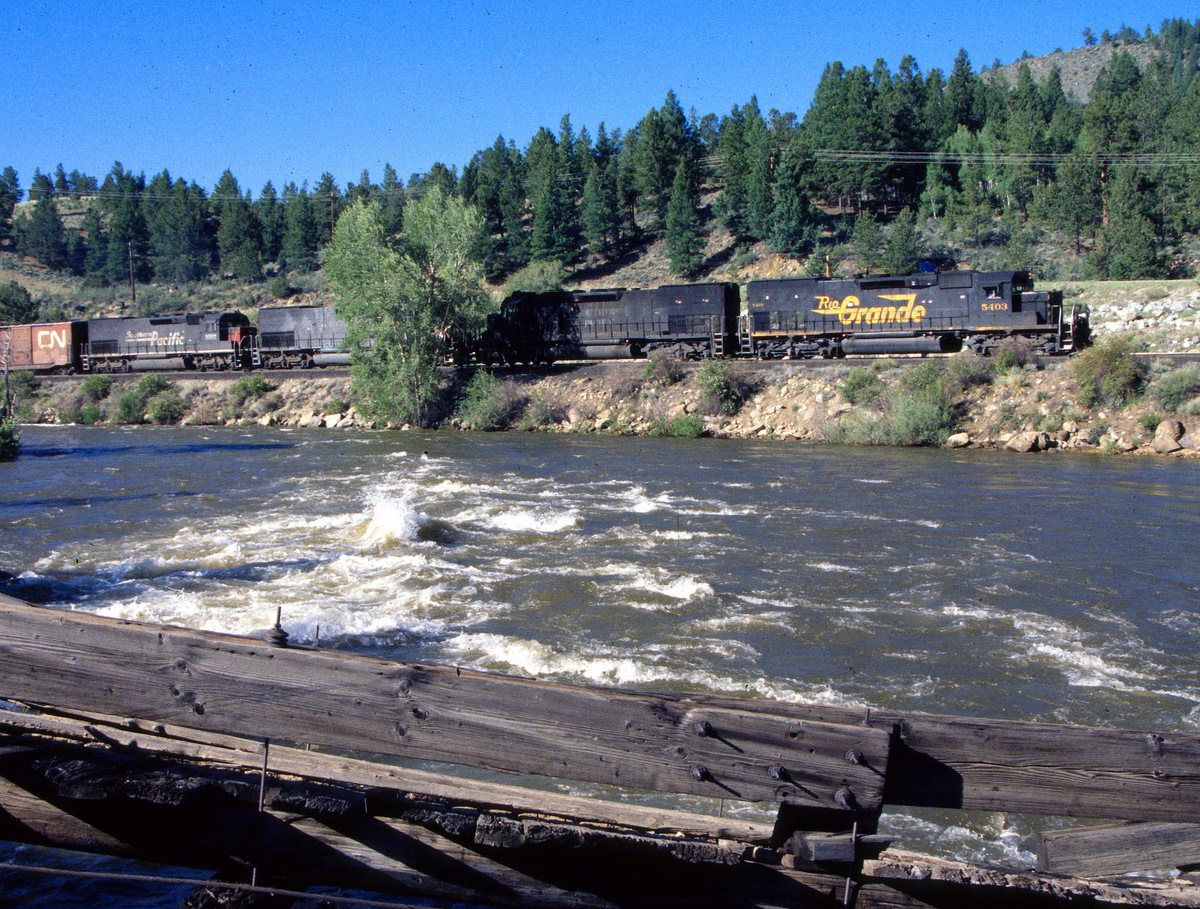
Denver & Rio Grande Western Railroad with the Arkansas River in the foreground, near Granite, Colorado around 1996

In 1870 the Denver Pacific Railroad was built, providing Denver with rail transport to Cheyenne, Wyoming. Tracks were rapidly being laid in southern Colorado as the Denver & Rio Grande Western and the Atchison, Topeka & Santa Fe fought for control of newly discovered mineral and coal deposits and ranching and farming areas. But the 1878 silver boom in Leadville changed everything, and by 1879 the rush for Leadville, 17 miles to the north of Granite, was on. With the boom, Leadville had rapidly become the third largest city in Colorado and the newly made millionaires had money and they wanted to spend it. Furthermore, they needed transport for their silver ore to the smelters in Denver or coal-rich southern Colorado, or a way to transport the coal from the southern coal mines to the upper Arkansas to fuel not only smelters, but blacksmith and machine shops, and assay offices as well. Without a local supply of coal they were using charcoal as fuel, in fact, the charcoal industry in Leadville employed an estimated 3,000 people, three times the number of those working in the mines, and the forests were being rapidly depleted.

With the chance to control Leadville's newly discovered riches, both the D&RG and the Santa Fe set their sights on Leadville. They both rapidly laid track, but when they reached the Grand Canyon of the Arkansas (Royal Gorge) there was not room for both of them. Over a hundred years later the D&RG would comment (on their website): "The Royal Gorge Route has, quite possibly, one of strangest histories of the entire Rio Grande system." The details of the "Royal Gorge War" can be read at the Royal Gorge Route Railroad Wikipedia article. After months of legal hassling, construction resumed and the D&RGW made it to Granite and reached Leadville on July 20, 1880. The line remained narrow gauge until 1888, when it became one of the first routes converted to dual gauge. In part this was done to handle the heavy freight coming out of Leadville, but primarily it was done to provide a standard gauge route west in order to compete effectively with the ever-expanding Colorado Midland.

=== Colorado Midland Railway ===
The Colorado Midland Railway, incorporated in 1883, was the first standard gauge railroad built over the Continental Divide in Colorado. It ran from Colorado Springs through Granite and Leadville, crossed the divide at Hagerman Pass, and went on to Aspen and Grand Junction. They had a more difficult time running their track because the routes that were the easiest places to lay rails had already been taken by the other railroads. The second problem was that the Colorado Midland was a standard gauge, so it needed more space to run the tracks. Curves were broader, bridges and tunnels had to be larger, and the total expense was considerably greater. A two-story depot existed in both Granite and Leadville and there was a roundhouse in Leadville as well. Old photos dated March and April 1887 show crews laying track in Granite and records show that the railroad had reached Leadville in August, with passenger and freight service inaugurated the following day.

The CM served Leadville’s mines and smelters until 1906, with tracks in Iowa Gulch and California Gulch, areas now termed the Leadville mining district. Service was discontinued in 1918 due to financial difficulties. The old Midland grade is still evident in Granite and sections of bridge can be seen about two miles south where the track crossed over to the west side of the river at Clear Creek. Evidence of the old bridge remains visible to hikers and four tunnels still exist farther south closer to Buena Vista.

==== Granite train wreck 1925 ====
On August 20, 1925, there was a head-on collision between two passenger trains on the Denver & Rio Grande Western Railroad near Granite, which resulted in 2 deaths and the injury of 107. The wreck was found to be the result of human error and a blistering report followed:

"It would be difficult to imagine a more inherently dangerous system, or lack of system, for the operation of trains under the trains under [sic] method of operation than that which appears to exist on this railroad. The disastrous results usually attendant upon careless handling of train orders are well illustrated in the present case, and the number and character of the violations of the rules, governing the handling of train orders raises a question as to whether the operating officials of this railroad have a proper appreciation of the responsibilities of their positions. While the immediate cause may be found to rest with the failure of some individual occupying a comparatively minor position, those responsible for the general conditions resulting in such failure occupy higher positions. They have the duty first to provide safe and adequate rules, for the operation of trains and then to enforce obedience to those rules, on the part of all concerned. This was not done in this ease, [sic] and for their failure they are equally responsible for the occurrence of this accident."

==== Granite train wreck 1926 ====
On September 5, 1926, a train wreck killed 28 people near Granite, Colorado, apparently because of excessive speed. Shortly after the accident The Salida Mail reported:

Twenty-eight people are known to be dead and one is known to be missing in the wreck of D. & R. G. W. passenger train No. 2, which occurred two miles west of Granite and eighteen miles east of Leadville shortly before noon Sunday. It is expected that when the coaches are lifted from the river other bodies will be found underneath. The task of identifying the dead is difficult because the deaths were all in the day coaches where no record of the names of passengers is kept.The wreck occurred on the first sharp curve entering the Granite district, where the railroad company is now changing the grade and spending a vast sum of money to eliminate the curve.

On October 8, 1926, the investigation concluded that the accident was caused by excessive speed: While conflicting in some details the best evidence indicates that train No. 2 approached the curve on which the accident occurred at a speed of approximately 40 or 45 miles per hour and that although Road Foreman of Equipment Lillis, who was operating the engine in the place of Engineman Harpending, made an application of the air brakes before the curve was reached, yet this application was not made soon enough to effect any appreciable reduction in speed before the curve was reached. The speed on this and all other sharp curves on this railroad is restricted to 30 miles per hour, and in view of the fact that an elevation of only 4 inches is provided for it is not considered that the prescribed limit can with reasonable safety be exceeded.

== Ghost towns ==
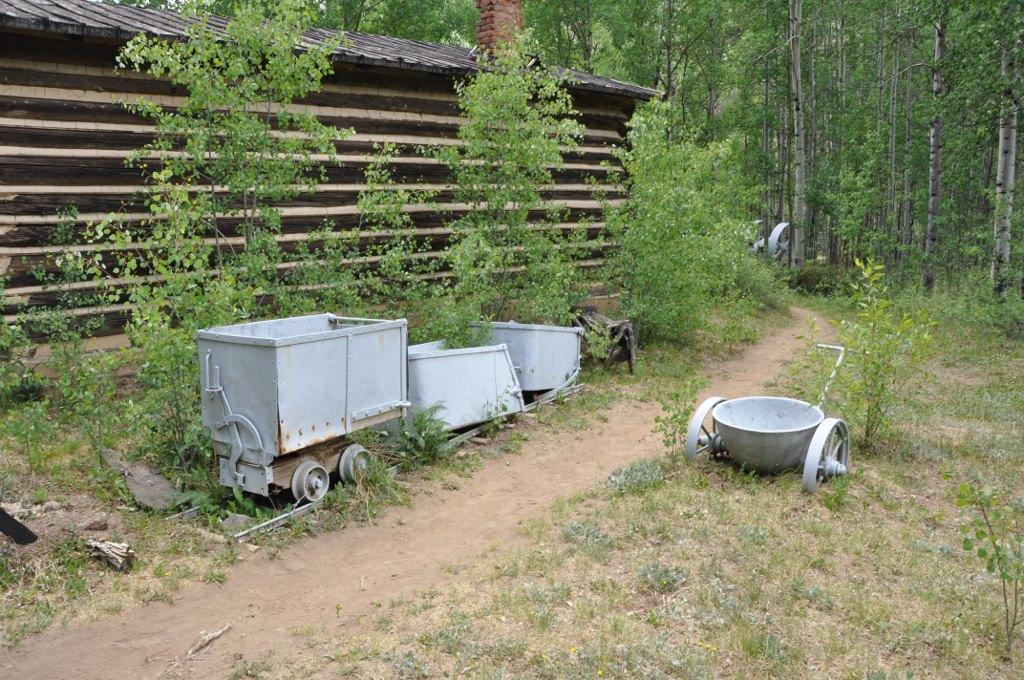
Abandoned mining equipment

Granite is a ghost of what it once was, what with both a railroad and a major highway running through it has survived the years. However, many old ghost towns remain in the hills surrounding Granite. As the prospectors searched for gold, every Arkansas River tributary was a potential gold mining site and a chance to strike it rich. About two miles south of Granite, Clear Creek empties into the Arkansas River. Although prospecting took place in this area as early as 1867 when the gravel bar reaching out into the Arkansas was found to be rich in placer gold, the real activity didn't take off until 1879 when the canyon exploded with mines everywhere. A report from that time relates: "The Free Republic [mine] was the first location made in this district, having been discovered in July, 1879. A tunnel has been run 85 feet, showing 3 feet of mineral in the breast, galena and copper, assays ranging from 10 to 131 ounces. For a distance of 49 feet the tunnel has been running through a horse [a block of rock interrupting a vein and containing no minerals], but the pay vein was struck and proved to be nearly 20 feet wide." This early report goes on to list the colorfully named mines of that time: The Mint, Prince Albert, Thunderbolt, Sixteen String Jack, Sunrise, Bluebird, Siamese Chief, Minnehaha, Silver Crop, Cinderella, Birdie Boy. and Terrible. A later report related that the four major mines were the Tasmania, the Fortune, the Banker and the Swiss Boy, so it would appear that most mines just did not "pan out". The towns of Beaver City, Vicksburg, Rockdale/Silverdale, Winfield, Hamilton, and others, once hives of activity, have either totally disappeared or remain primarily as ghost towns with only a few remaining buildings.

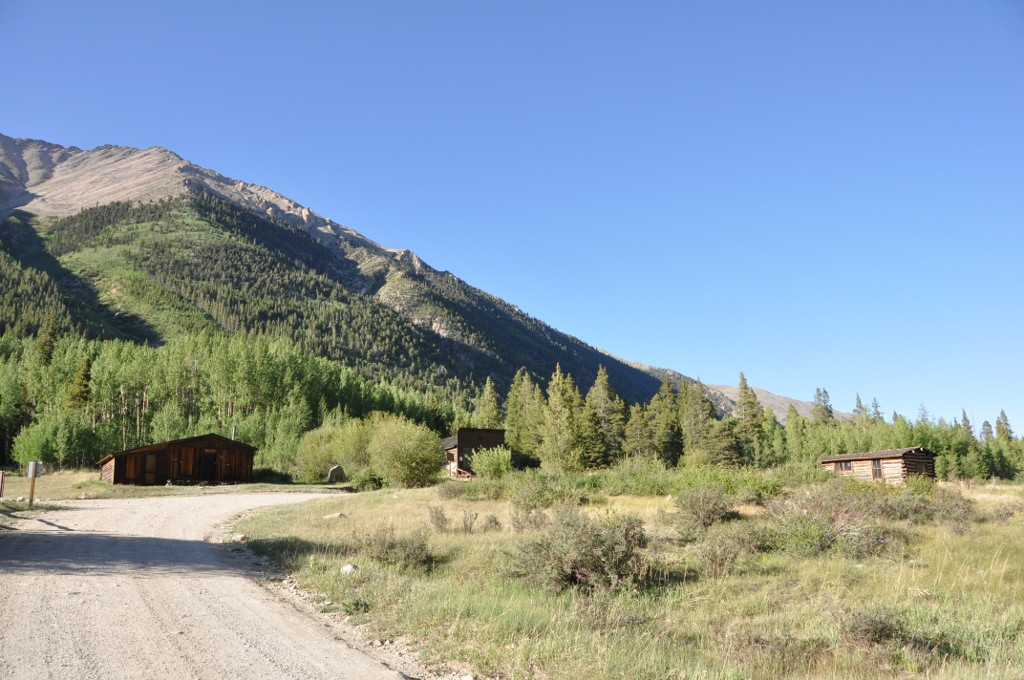
Winfield mining camp

Winfield was the largest settlement. In 1890 the estimated population is listed as fifteen hundred, but it can be assumed that hundreds more lived in the surrounding area. Winfield included three saloons, three stores, a post office, two hotels, a boarding house, mill, smelter, ore concentrator, church, and a school. The last ore was hauled out by stage in 1918. Several restored buildings remain, including the school.

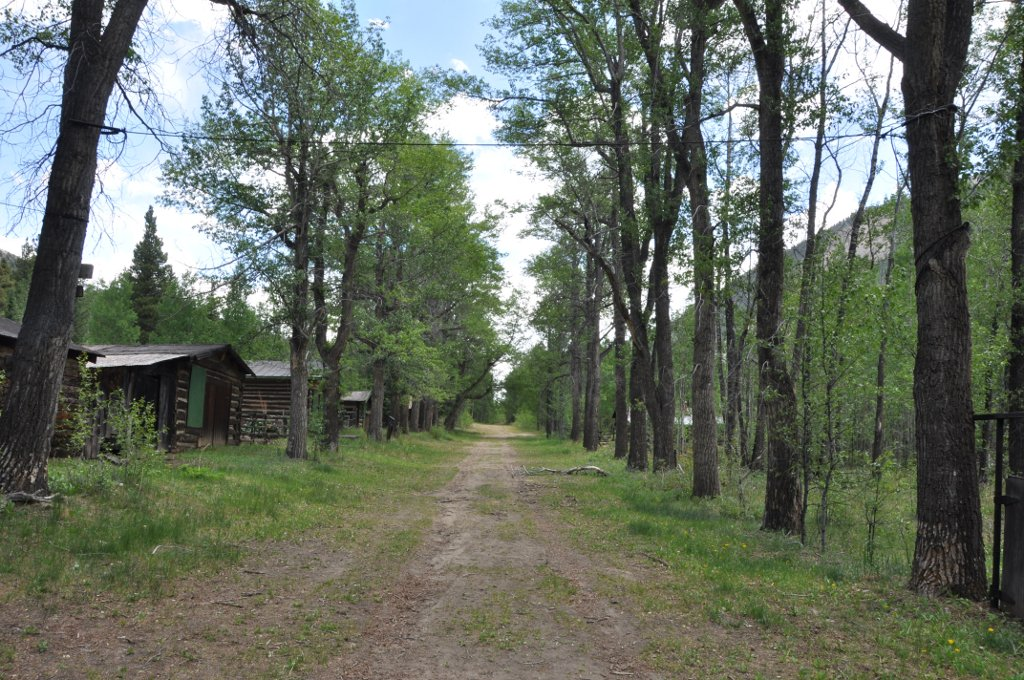
Vicksburg Main Street

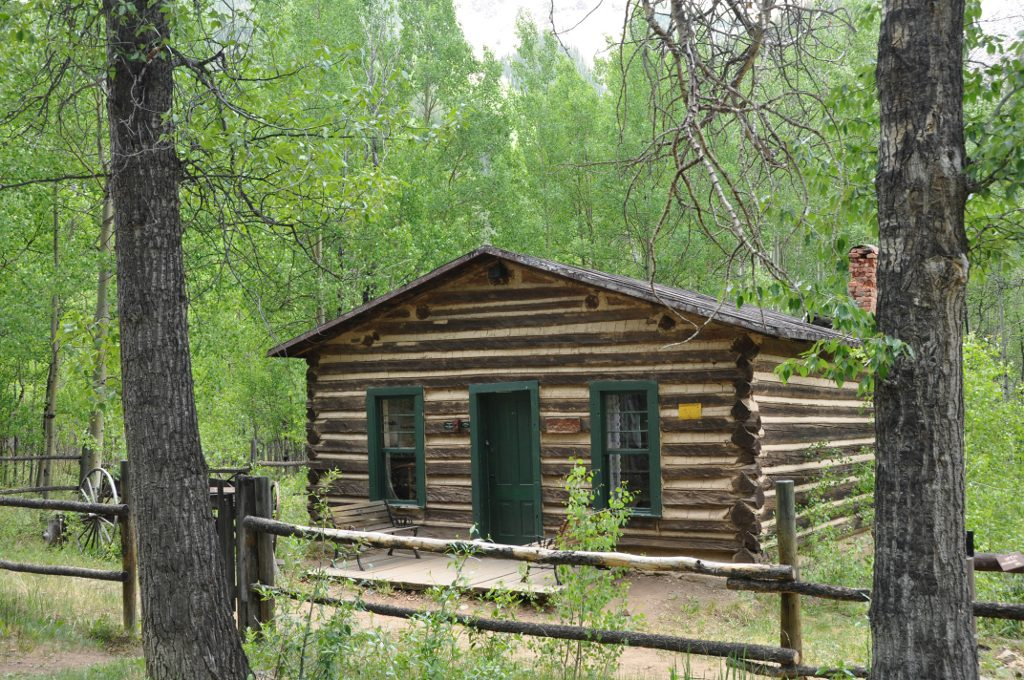
Early Vicksburg cabin

Vicksburg was founded in 1867 after prospectors from Leadville camping out in the Clear Creek Canyon lost their burros. The burros had wandered down the creek and when the miners found their pack animals, they discovered gold in the creek bed as well. In its heyday, Vicksburg had a post office, school, blacksmith, two hotels, two billiard halls, several saloons, a general store, an assay office, and a livery stable. Early miners packed in Balm of Gilead (balsam poplar) trees on the backs of burros and planted them to line the street. The early settlers likely used the sticky sap of the trees to make a medicinal salve used for both animals and humans alike. The trees still stand today and are watered by ditches leading from Vicksburg Creek into the town. The ditches were dug on either side of the street to provide a water system; wooden boxes were built in the ditches to keep food cold and provide water to fight fires. A daily stage ran from Vicksburg to Granite; the fare was $1.50.

Located near Vicksburg but dating to the 1930s is the Crescent Moly Mine #100 and Mining Camp. However, the Crescent Moly was not a gold mine but was associated with the molybdenum boom and the nearby Climax mine phenomenon. Vicksburg, Winfield and the Crescent Moly Mine are listed on the National Register of Historic Places.

A mile further down the valley Pine Creek empties into the Arkansas and evidence remains of prospecting and mining in this area as well. The Colorado Historical Society lists the Littlejohn mine camp on the north bank of Pine Creek:

North bank of Pine Creek, vicinity of Granite
National Register 12/27/1978, 5CF.138
Located in the Pine Creek mining district, structures in the complex include a cabin, a burro shed/bunk house, a forge, and several related outbuildings. All date from the 1880s and are constructed of hand hewn logs with A and V joints. Low pitch gabled roofs were made of logs, mud, dirt, and grass. Such intact examples of early log mining camps are rare as many were quickly abandoned or replaced with wood frame or masonry structures. Harry Littlejohn, who acquired the property in 1920 and lived and worked there until his death in 1952, is credited with maintaining the integrity of the complex.

== Granite Cemetery ==
The Granite Cemetery, also known as the Cache Creek Cemetery, is located about one and one-half miles west of Granite. The earliest known burial is said to be that of an unknown 19-year-old male who died of pneumonia in 1860; the first marked burial is dated 1878. The cemetery is still in use.

One of the earliest graves is that of Rufus Lumry, an abolitionist circuit preacher who was returning from an expedition to help miners thought to be starving in the mountains and got caught in driftwood while trying to cross nearby Cache Creek, where he died of hypothermia on June 21, 1862.

Another early grave is that of Pat Casey, a gandy dancer (section crew worder) who was murdered in 1888 when his throat was slit by Niccolo Feminello, also a railroad worker. Feminello was convicted of the murder and became infamous as being the only "legal hanging" to take place in Chaffee County. Feminello was buried in the Mt Olivet cemetery in Buena Vista after his execution behind the Buena Vista court house.

Several graves contain the remains of the last of the old-time miners that still lived in the hills surrounding Granite. Charles Franklin, born in 1868 in Sweden and immigrated to the U.S. in 1888; died in 1950. Known locally as "Old Man Franklin", he lived in a one-room log cabin with a dirt floor located on the Arkansas River near Clear Creek, just south of Granite. Like the other "last of their breed" that were soon to follow him in death, he was unmarried and lived alone. The following year Frank Churchill, another never-married miner, was found dead in Clear Creek near his cabin; it was some time before his body was discovered.

Dave Jardine, another old miner, lived in a log cabin situated on Pine Creek, south of Granite, till his death in 1953. Jardine always carried a "doodlebug", a pendulum similar to that used for dousing, to tell the future or just for advice. Dave, or "Stinky Dave" as he was called, loved dogs and had five or six strays which he kept in his cabin at night. He had deep chronic venous ulcers on both ankles that may have been the cause of his bad odor, and may well have been the cause of his death. According to county records, when authorities discovered him he had been eaten by his dogs after he had died alone in his cabin.

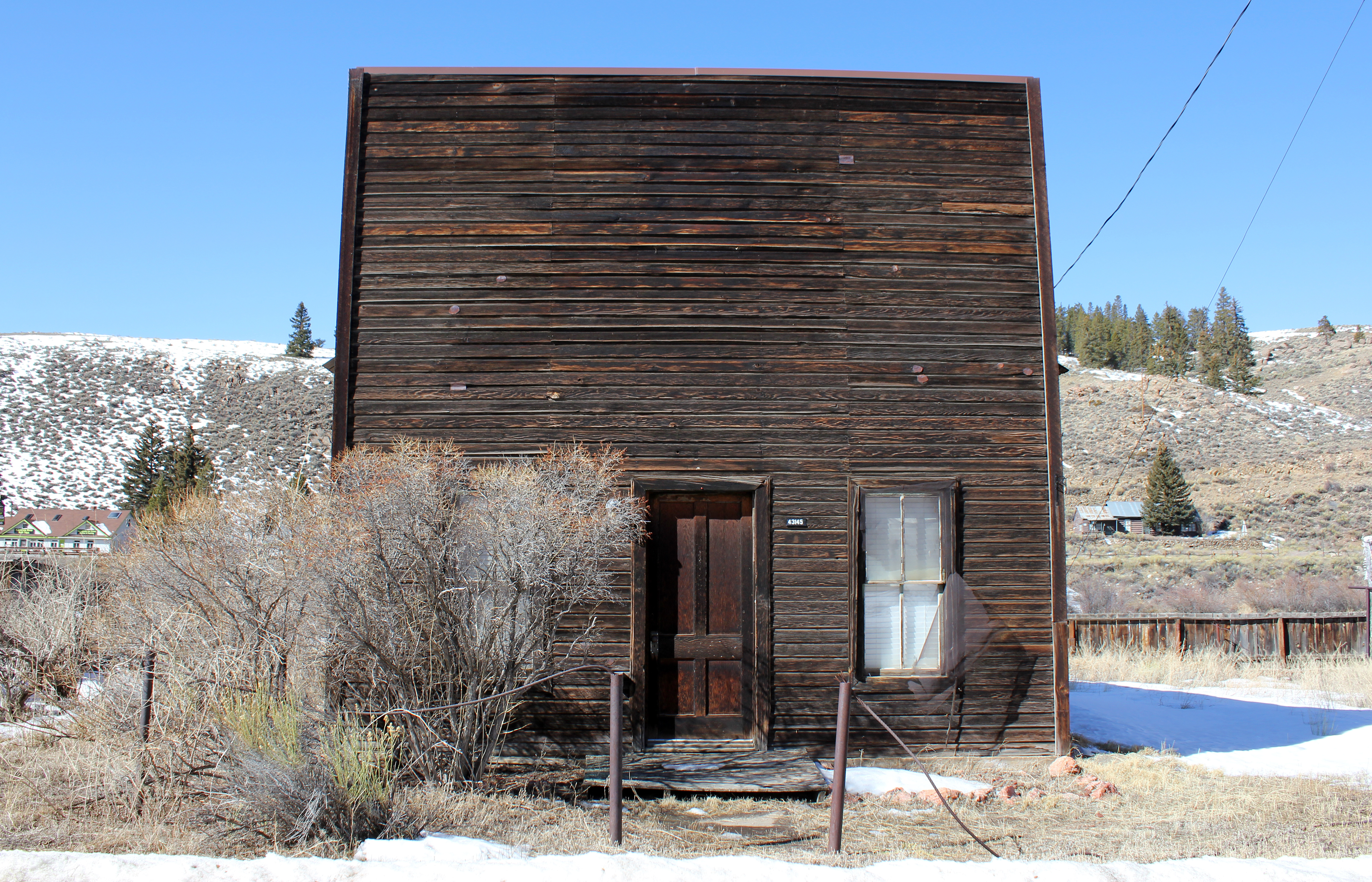
Pine Hall, located at 43145 County Road 397. A community hall, the property is listed on the National Register of Historic Places. (Note the Granite General Store located behind and to the left of the hall)

== Granite today ==
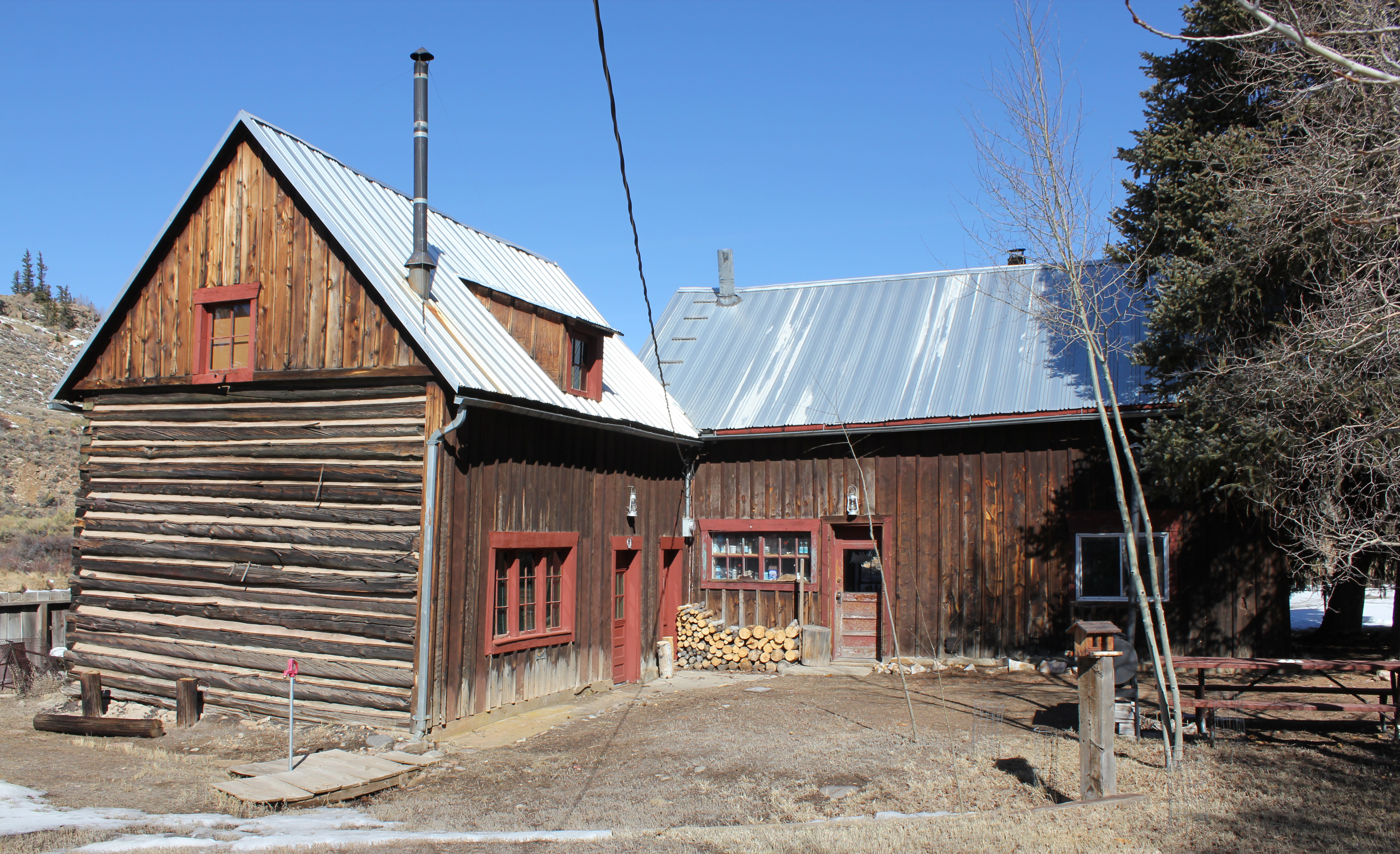
The Commercial Hotel, 43255 County Road 397, is listed on the National Register of Historic Places.

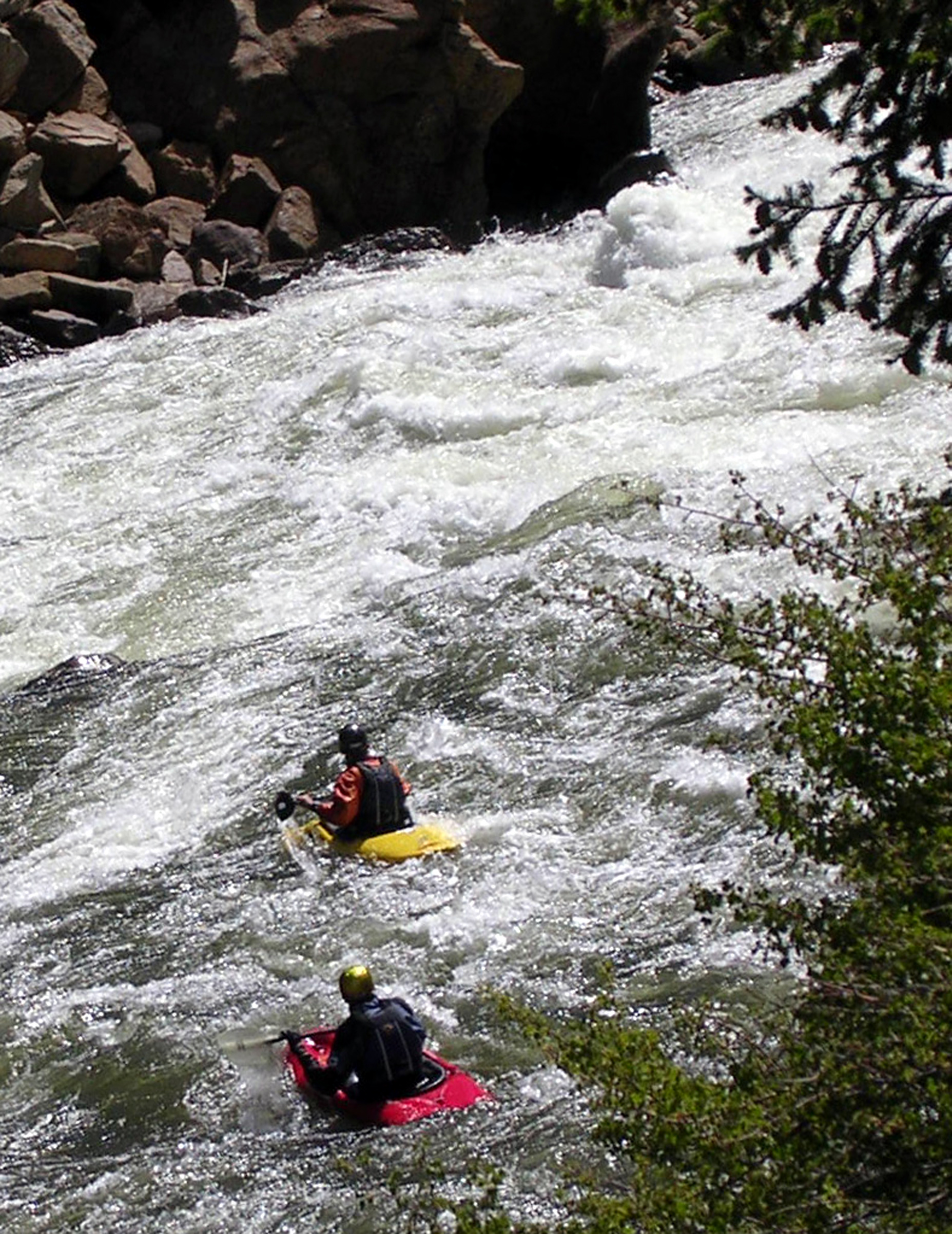
Two kayakers running the Pine Creek Rapids section of the Arkansas River

Little remains of Granite's past. In the 1950s a Colorado couple ran a gold panning tourist attraction they named "Gold Camp", just south of town at the point that Pine Creek runs into the Arkansas. By 1955, the Granite school enrollment had dwindled to only thirteen and the school was closed. The railroad ended service in the 1980s. Chaffee County lists the school and the Denver & Rio Grande railroad building and several other still-standing buildings including a blacksmith-livery, a hotel, and a stage stop as sites of historical interest.

Today this area draws whitewater rafting enthusiasts. The rapids were created by a massive glacial flood which spread boulders down the river for over fifty miles. The whitewater area starts in the "Granite Gorge" with class IV rapids and the river rapidly drops to the steepest point at "Pine Creek Rapids", class V.

Situated within the San Isabel National Forest and surrounded by three wilderness areas, Granite is also a popular hiking area. The Mount Massive Wilderness area lies a few miles north, the Buffalo Peaks Wilderness is to the east within the Mosquito Range, and the Collegiate Peaks Wilderness is to the west within the Sawatch Range.

The Cache Creek area remains of interest to modern-day prospectors looking for the placer gold that was left behind when mining operations ended in 1911. Cache Creek is managed by the Bureau of Land Management for wildlife habitat, wetlands, open space, and small-scale placer mining.

For years only one business remained open, the Granite General Store, however it closed in 2007. The building was originally an 1880s bunk house for railroad workers. Currently there are only eight year-round residents in Granite. Most people, even "locals", pass through Granite unaware of its historical past.

== Popular culture ==
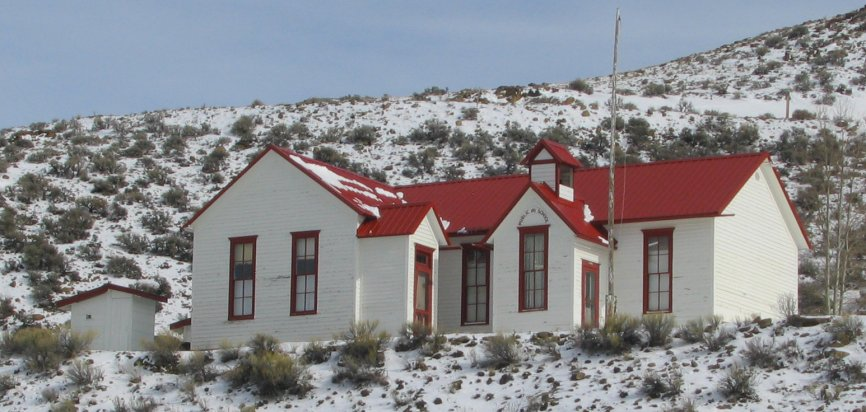
Granite, Colorado one-room school (with outhouse in the back), 1954

In 1954, 7th grade Granite student Juliann Horvath, a year young for her class because she had started school a year early, won the Chaffee County combined 7th and 8th grade spelling bee. Juliann was one of only three Granite 7th grade students, and the total school enrollment that year was less than twenty.

Doc Holliday, gambler, gunfighter, and dentist of the American Old West and most remembered for his involvement in the 1881 Gunfight at the O.K. Corral, left Arizona by rail and then took the Leadville stage from Buena Vista, north through Granite, and on to Leadville in 1882.

== See also ==
- Chaffee County, Colorado
- History of Lake County, Colorado
