= Derry Mining Site Camp =

- U.S. National Register of Historic Places
- U.S. Historic district
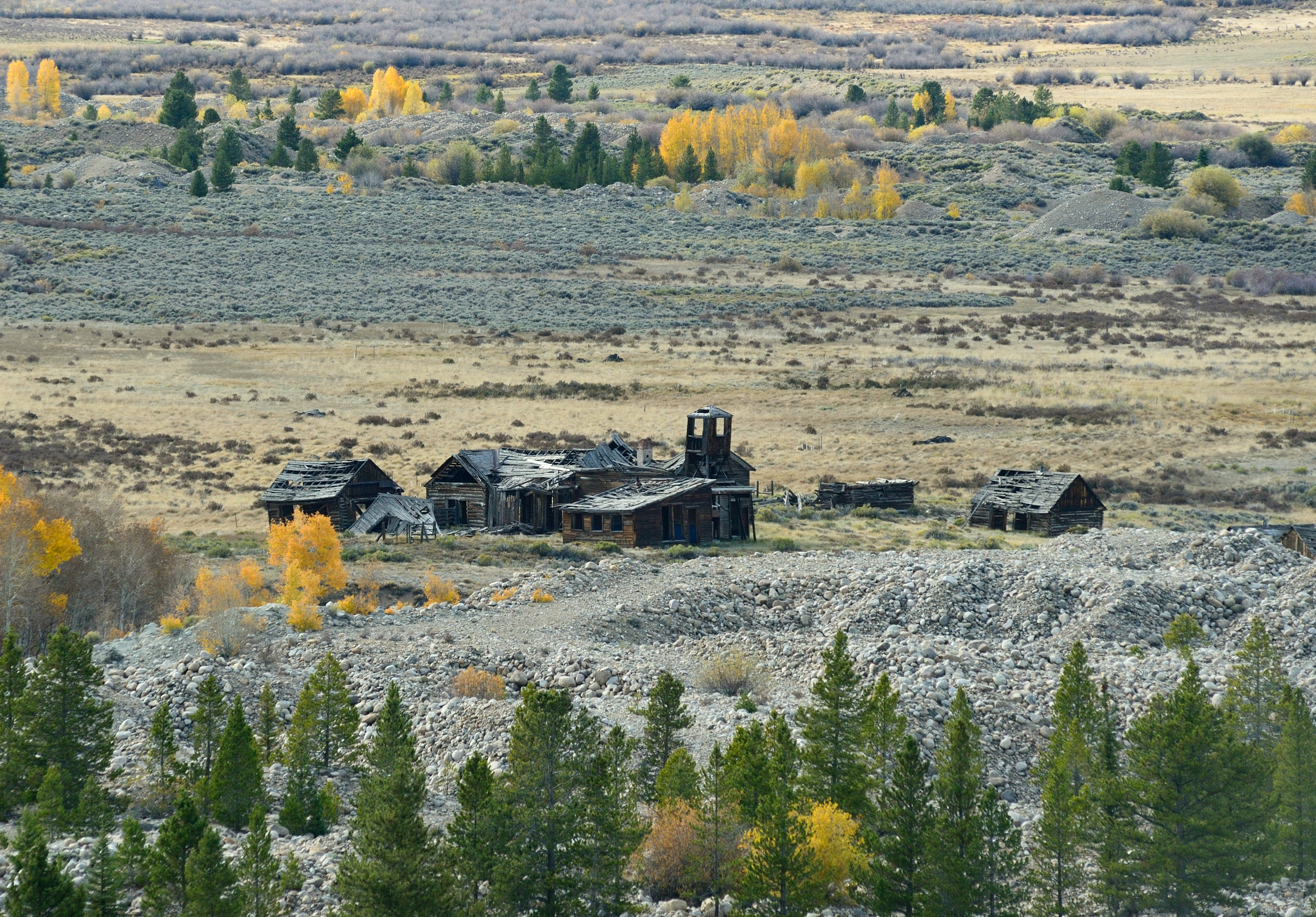
- The site in 2016.

- Location within Colorado Location within the United States
- Location: West of Route 24, Leadville, Colorado
- Coordinates: 39°07′24″N 106°20′37″W
- Area: 8.5 acres (3.4 ha)
- Built: Early 1900s
- Built by: Derry, Samuel; New York Engineering Co.
- Architectural style: Log cabin
- NRHP reference No.: 00000782
- Added to NRHP: July 14, 2000

Derry Mining Site Camp was a mining site camp near Leadville, Colorado that operated during 1916–1923. It is located on the old Twin Lakes Toll Road, at an elevation of 9,320 feet (2,840 m). The placer mine was established on and named after the Derry Ranch established by Samuel Derry, who purchased the land in May of 1878. He homesteaded and farmed hay that was sold to feed the animals that worked in the gold rush operations in Leadville. When Derry died in 1889, his son Calaincourt Derry inherited the ranch and continued farming it until his death in 1908, at which time the ranch was sold to the Saguache Gold Mining Company, which began small-scale placer mining.

In 1913, the Saguache Gold Mining Company sold the land to the New York Engineering Company, which began shipping the components of a mechanical bucket dredge for assembly at the site, and in 1915, the 600-ton machine began operation on Corske Creek. It was at this point that the ten log cabin structures were built around Derry's original homestead building, to house mining workers. Currently, two of these buildings have collapsed and eight are still standing.

The Derry Dredge could dig to a depth of 30 feet, creating a small artificial lake on which the dredge floated while in operation. It is said that in the first three months of the Derry Dredge's operation, it recovered 3000 ounces of raw gold, making it one of Lake County’s richest placer gold deposits.

In 1924, the dredge operation was sold to the Mount Elbert Gold Dredging Company, and the operation was continued in Box Creek until 1926, when the dredge was dismantled. In 1935 or 1936, the property purchased by Charles Hallenbeck and Bruce Claybaugh, and rented by the Paddock family, who lived in the homestead and raised hay until 1937. Hallenbeck and Claybaugh continued to placer mine the property, and the ranch took on the name of its new owner, Charles Hallenbeck. In 1948 they leased the property to Gold Field Consolidated, which mined it until 1951. In 1952, the property was sold at auction to investors, who failed to realize their plan to build a ski resort on Mount Elbert. They put the land up for sale, and in May of 1998, Lake County purchased the property and its water rights.

The Derry Mining Site was listed on the National Register of Historic Places in 2000. The listing included eight contributing buildings and one contributing site. It is close to the Hayden Ranch Headquarters, which is also National Register-listed.

== See also ==
- National Register of Historic Places listings in Lake County, Colorado
