= Golden Burro Cafe and Lounge =

Historic building in Colorado, United States

- U.S. National Register of Historic Places
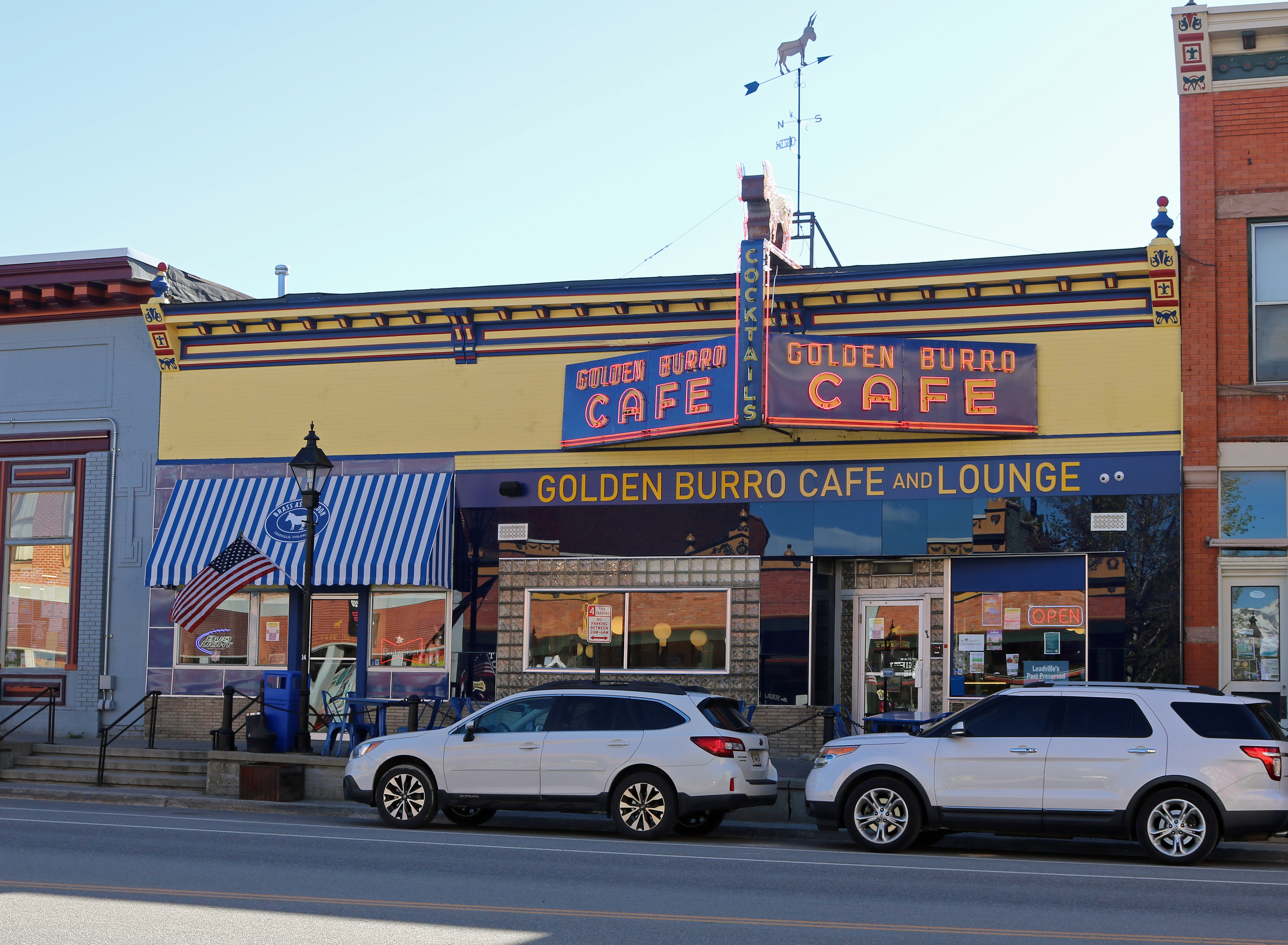
- Golden Burro Cafe and Lounge in June 2023.
- Location: Leadville, Colorado
- Built: 1898
- Built by: E.H. Dimick
- Website: www.goldenburro.com
- NRHP reference No.: 100008732
- Designated NRHP: 2023

The Golden Burro Cafe and Lounge is a restaurant in Leadville, Colorado. In 2023, the building was added to the National Register of Historic Places.

== History ==
=== Early history of the building ===
The structure at 710 Harrison Avenue in Leadville, Colorado that currently houses the Golden Burro Cafe and Lounge was built for commercial purposes in 1898 by E.H. Dimick.

=== Establishing and expanding the Golden Burro ===
In 1934, Roy Pray opened Roy's Lunch restaurant at 614 Harrison Avenue. The business was purchased by Charlie Frey in 1938. Frey renamed the restaurant the Golden Burro and moved operations to their current location in 1945. The building was renovated in 1958 as Frey expanded the restaurant to incorporate the Brass Ass Saloon.

=== New ownership and renovation ===
In April 2021, the establishment was purchased by Marcee and Dan Lundeen, who adopted a vegan menu for the restaurant and initiated a historic preservation process on the building alongside the Colorado State Historical Register, the National Historical Register, and Colorado Main Street. The following year, the owners received a $40,000 grant to fund preservation efforts from the National Trust for Historic Preservation and American Express Backing Historic Small Restaurants Grant Program. The Golden Burro was added to the National Register of Historic Places in 2023. The Lundeens later leased to the building to local businessmen Armando and Fernando López. Under their direction, the restaurant's menu shifted more towards Mexican cuisine, but the sign and other features were still preserved.
