= Twin Lakes, Lake County, Colorado =

Unincorporated community in Colorado, US

- Census-designated place
- Location of the Twin Lakes CDP in Lake County, Colorado
- Coordinates: 39°06′43″N 106°19′18″W
- Country: United States
- State: Colorado
- County: Lake

Government
  - Type: Unincorporated town

Area
  - Total: 1.661 sq mi (4.302 km^{2})
  - Land: 1.644 sq mi (4.258 km^{2})
  - Water: 0.017 sq mi (0.044 km^{2})
- Elevation: 9,600 ft (2,900 m)

Population (2020 census)
  - Total: 204
  - Density: 124/sq mi (47.9/km^{2})
- Time zone: UTC-7 (MST)
  - Summer (DST): UTC-6 (MDT)
- ZIP Code: 81251
- Area code: 719
- GNIS feature ID: 2583308

Twin Lakes is a pair of glacier-carved alpine lakes about 15 miles (24 km) south of historic Leadville, Colorado. They are downstream along the Arkansas River, whose headwaters are by Leadville. The lakes, however, are on a tributary, Lake Creek, which joins the Arkansas just below the lakes. After dredging, the lakes now have a surface area of 2,700 acres (11 km^{2}), and they serve as a reservoir to store water for use in the Front Range. Both east and west lakes are recreation areas for boating and fishing.

Twin Lakes is also the name of an adjacent census-designated place (CDP) and a post office in and governed by Lake County, Colorado, United States. The Twin Lakes post office has the ZIP Code 81251. At the United States Census 2020, the population of the Twin Lakes CDP was 204.

== History ==
Lake County, one of the original 17 counties created by the Colorado legislature in 1861, was named for the Twin Lakes. As originally defined, Lake County included a large portion of western Colorado to the south and west of its present boundaries. The Twin Lakes District has been listed on the National Register of Historic Places since 1974.

== Geography ==
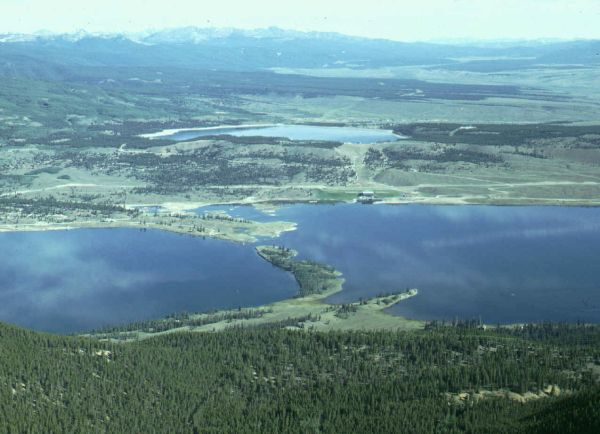
Aerial view of Twin Lakes, 2004

The Twin Lakes and the Twin Lakes CDP are located about 15 miles (24 km) south of Leadville, the county seat. The CDP is bounded on the east by U.S. Route 24 (US 24), on the south by Colorado State Highway 82 (SH 82, and on the north and west by County Highway 24. About 4 miles (6 km) west of the CDP is the original community of Twin Lakes, near the west end of what is now the Twin Lakes Reservoir. The reservoir lies south of SH 82, outside the CDP. SH 82 leads west across Independence Pass 40 miles (64 km) to Aspen, while US 24 leads north to Leadville and south 20 miles (32 km) to Buena Vista.

The altitude of the Twin Lakes area ranges from 9,200 feet (2,800 m) to over 9,800 feet (3,000 m), all of it somewhat lower than Leadville. Mount Elbert, the highest peak in Colorado, rises directly west of the CDP to its 14,433-foot (4,399 m) summit, just 6 miles (10 km) west of the center of the CDP.

The Twin Lakes CDP has an area of 1,063 acres (4.302 km^{2}), including 11 acres (0.044 km^{2}) of water, (much less than the surface area of the Twin Lakes themselves).

=== Climate ===
Climate data for Twin Lakes Reservoir, Colorado, 1991–2020 normals, 1967-2020 extremes: 9236ft (2815m)
Month	Jan	Feb	Mar	Apr	May	Jun	Jul	Aug	Sep	Oct	Nov	Dec	Year
Record high °F (°C)	57 (14)	58 (14)	61 (16)	69 (21)	82 (28)	85 (29)	88 (31)	85 (29)	83 (28)	75 (24)	68 (20)	60 (16)	88 (31)
Mean maximum °F (°C)	49.3 (9.6)	49.8 (9.9)	54.9 (12.7)	61.5 (16.4)	71.3 (21.8)	79.3 (26.3)	83.0 (28.3)	79.7 (26.5)	75.6 (24.2)	68.1 (20.1)	57.9 (14.4)	50.3 (10.2)	83.6 (28.7)
Mean daily maximum °F (°C)	33.7 (0.9)	34.8 (1.6)	41.2 (5.1)	46.3 (7.9)	57.7 (14.3)	69.6 (20.9)	74.4 (23.6)	71.3 (21.8)	64.5 (18.1)	53.4 (11.9)	42.2 (5.7)	33.8 (1.0)	51.9 (11.1)
Daily mean °F (°C)	19.4 (−7.0)	20.0 (−6.7)	27.3 (−2.6)	33.8 (1.0)	43.7 (6.5)	53.1 (11.7)	58.6 (14.8)	56.5 (13.6)	49.9 (9.9)	39.9 (4.4)	29.5 (−1.4)	20.7 (−6.3)	37.7 (3.2)
Mean daily minimum °F (°C)	5.1 (−14.9)	5.2 (−14.9)	13.3 (−10.4)	21.3 (−5.9)	29.7 (−1.3)	36.6 (2.6)	42.8 (6.0)	41.6 (5.3)	35.2 (1.8)	26.3 (−3.2)	16.8 (−8.4)	7.6 (−13.6)	23.5 (−4.7)
Mean minimum °F (°C)	−13.7 (−25.4)	−14.2 (−25.7)	−5.7 (−20.9)	7.2 (−13.8)	18.6 (−7.4)	28.6 (−1.9)	36.3 (2.4)	35.0 (1.7)	24.6 (−4.1)	11.9 (−11.2)	−0.6 (−18.1)	−10.4 (−23.6)	−18.5 (−28.1)
Record low °F (°C)	−40 (−40)	−45 (−43)	−29 (−34)	−19 (−28)	−7 (−22)	13 (−11)	23 (−5)	22 (−6)	13 (−11)	−2 (−19)	−18 (−28)	−31 (−35)	−45 (−43)
Average precipitation inches (mm)	0.44 (11)	0.57 (14)	0.70 (18)	0.83 (21)	0.92 (23)	0.72 (18)	1.67 (42)	1.56 (40)	1.13 (29)	0.82 (21)	0.46 (12)	0.49 (12)	10.31 (261)
Average snowfall inches (cm)	4.3 (11)	6.3 (16)	6.6 (17)	6.0 (15)	2.0 (5.1)	0.0 (0.0)	0.0 (0.0)	0.0 (0.0)	0.1 (0.25)	2.3 (5.8)	4.3 (11)	5.1 (13)	37 (94.15)
Average precipitation days (≥ 0.01 in)	4.3	5.0	5.7	6.1	7.7	7.1	11.6	12.3	6.7	5.4	3.9	3.8	79.6
Average snowy days (≥ 0.1 in)	3.2	3.6	4.0	2.8	0.8	0.0	0.0	0.0	0.0	1.2	2.4	3.0	21
Source 1: NOAA
Source 2: XMACIS (snow, records & monthly max/mins)

== Demographics ==
Twin Lakes CDP, Lake County, Colorado
Year	Pop.	±%
2010	171	—
2020	204	+19.3%
Source: United States Census Bureau

The United States Census Bureau initially defined the Twin Lakes CDP for the United States Census 2010.

== See also ==
- List of census-designated places in Colorado
