= List of largest reservoirs in Colorado =

The location of the State of Colorado in the United States of America.

This is a list of the largest reservoirs in the state of Colorado. All forty reservoirs that contain greater than 40,000 acre-feet (49 million cubic meters) are included in the list. Most of the larger reservoirs in the state are owned by the United States Bureau of Reclamation and, to a lesser extent, the Corps of Engineers. Additionally, a number of these reservoirs are owned by private companies for flood control and irrigation purposes. The largest reservoir entirely contained in Colorado is Blue Mesa Reservoir, with a capacity of 829,500 acre⋅ft (1.0 billion m^{3}). The total storage of the reservoirs on this list is 3,804,458 acre⋅ft (4.7 billion m^{3}), although not all is allocated for use by Colorado.

== Reservoirs ==
Key
† denotes reservoir not entirely in Colorado
‡ denotes that reservoir is offstream and fed by canals

== List ==
Rank	Name	County/counties	Coordinates	Volume (Note: When available, volume given is the maximum flood pool, not the operational or live storage capacity.) (acre-feet)	Volume (km^{3})	Elevation (Note: Elevations listed are in feet, and indicated the elevation of reservoir at full pool.)	Inflow (Note: Where multiple sources fill a reservoir, the largest inflow will be listed. If a reservoir is off-river, source river will be listed.)	Dam(s) (Note: In the case of reservoirs with multiple dams (such as Horsetooth Reservoir), all will be listed if resources allow.)	Image
1	Navajo Reservoir	Archuleta, Rio Arriba†, San Juan†	36°49′12″N 107°36′12″W	1,708,600	2.1075	6,089	San Juan	Navajo Dam	
2	Blue Mesa Reservoir	Gunnison	38°28′31″N 107°17′16″W	829,500	1.2032	7,519	Gunnison River	Blue Mesa Dam	
3	John Martin Reservoir	Bent	38°03′59″N 102°57′16″W	603,500	0.7444	3,870	Arkansas River	John Martin Dam	
4	Lake Granby	Grand	40°08′32″N 105°50′54″W	539,758	0.6658	8,280	Colorado River	Granby Dam	
5	McPhee Reservoir	Montezuma	37°34′26″N 108°33′29″W	381,100	0.4701	6,929	Dolores River	McPhee Dam	
6	Pueblo Reservoir	Pueblo	38°15′59″N 104°44′17″W	349,940	0.4317	4,899	Arkansas River	Pueblo Dam	
7	Dillon Reservoir	Summit	39°37′04″N 106°03′20″W	257,304	0.3174	9,022	Blue River	Dillon Dam	
8	Bonny Reservoir (Drained, 2011)	Yuma	39°37′16″N 102°10′53″W	165,238 (Note: Because of the 1942 Republican River Compact, Kansas was able to force Colorado and Nebraska to make up for water that had been previously owed. As a result, the reservoir is now dry, and will likely remain so for the foreseeable future.)	0.2038	3,710	South Fork Republican River	Bonny Dam	
9	Horsetooth Reservoir	Larimer	40°31′45″N 105°08′51″W	156,735	0.1933	5,430	Colorado River via Colorado-Big Thompson Project‡	Dixon Canyon, Spring Canyon, Soldier Canyon, Horsetooth	
10	Green Mountain Reservoir	Summit	39°52′44″N 106°18′20″W	153,639	0.1895	7,950	Blue River	Green Mountain Dam	
11	Twin Lakes Reservoir	Lake	39°04′51″N 106°19′15″W	141,000	0.1739	9,200	Lake Creek	Twin Lakes Dam	
12	Sanchez Reservoir	Costilla	37°06′32″N 105°24′50″W	137,850	0.1271	8,261	Ventero Creek	Sanchez Dam	
13	Turquoise Lake	Lake	39°15′39″N 106°21′59″W	129,398	0.1956	9,869	Boustead Tunnel‡	Sugar Loaf Dam	
14	Vallecito Reservoir	La Plata	37°22′59″N 107°33′47″W	125,400	0.1547	7,671	Los Pinos River	Vallecito Dam	
15	Lake Nighthorse	La Plata	37°22′59″N, 107°33′47″W	123,541	0.1523	6,882	Animas River‡	Ridges Basin Dam	
16	Morrow Point Reservoir	Gunnison, Montrose	38°26′46″N 107°31′19″W	117,025	0.1443	7,160	Gunnison River	Morrow Point Dam	
17	Carter Lake Reservoir	Larimer	40°19′56″N 105°13′07″W	112,230	0.1384	5,759	Colorado River via Colorado-Big Thompson Project‡	Carter Lake Dam	
18	Taylor Park Reservoir	Gunnison	38°49′36″N 106°35′38″W	106,210	0.1310	9,337	Taylor River	Taylor Park Dam	
19	Ruedi Reservoir	Pitkin, Eagle	39°21′53″N 106°48′54″W	102,373	0.1263	7,766	Fryingpan River	Ruedi Dam	
20	Nee Gronda Reservoir	Kiowa	38°18′13″N 102°45′24″W	98,660	0.1217	3,878	Arkansas River via inlet canal‡	natural depression	
21	Elevenmile Canyon Reservoir	Park	38°54′50″N 105°29′50″W	97,780	0.1209	8,566	South Platte River	Elevenmile Canyon Dam	
22	Williams Fork Reservoir	Grand	40°01′33″N 106°12′50″W	96,822	0.1194	7,808	Williams Fork	Williams Fork Dam	
23	Cherry Creek Reservoir	Arapahoe	39°38′35″N 104°51′27″W	95,960	0.1184	5,551	Cherry Creek	Cherry Creek Dam	
24	Nee Noshe Reservoir	Kiowa	38°20′26″N 102°41′39″W	94,850	0.1170	3,924	Arkansas River via inlet canal‡	Nee Noshe Dam	
25	Ridgway Reservoir	Ouray	38°13′48″N 107°45′13″W	84,230	0.1024	6,699	Uncompahgre River	Ridgway Dam	
26	Cheesman Lake	Douglas, Jefferson	39°12′31″N 105°16′36″W	79,060	0.0975	6,847	South Platte River	Cheesman Dam	
27	North Sterling Reservoir	Logan	40°46′36″N 103°16′50″W	74,590	0.0920	4,071	South Platte River via inlet canal‡	North Sterling Dam	
28	Adobe Creek Reservoir	Bent, Kiowa	38°16′20″N 103°14′46″W	70,000	0.0863	4,131	Adobe Creek via inlet canal‡		
29	Wolford Mountain Reservoir	Grand	40°07′45″N 106°24′41″W	65,985	0.0814	7,405	Muddy Creek (Colorado)	Wolford Mountain Dam	
30	Riverside Reservoir	Weld	40°20′15″N 104°15′33″W	65,008	0.0802	4,511	South Platte River via inlet canal		
31	Platoro Reservoir	Conejos	37°20′32″N 106°33′23″W	59,570	0.0735	9,977	Conejos River	Platoro Dam	
32	Spinney Mountain Reservoir	Park	38°58′33″N 105°37′55″W	53,873	0.0665	8,691	South Platte River		
33	Rio Grande Reservoir	Hinsdale	37°43′10″N 107°16′50″W	51,110	0.0630	9,400	Rio Grande	Rio Grande Dam	
34	Boyd Lake	Larimer	40°25′39″N 105°01′55″W	49,048	0.0605	4,961	Big Thompson River via inlet canal	Boyd Lake Dam	
35	Two Buttes Reservoir	Baca, Prowers	37°38′07″N 102°33′03″W	48,720	0.0601	4,232	Two Buttes Creek	Two Buttes Dam	
36	Santa Maria Reservoir	Mineral	37°48′06″N 107°05′35″W	43,500	0.0537	9,488	North Clear Creek via inlet canal	none	
37	Homestake Reservoir	Pitkin, Eagle	39°21′43″N 106°27′59″W	42,822	0.0528	10,266	Middle Fork Homestake Creek	Homestake Project Dam	
38	Gross Reservoir	Boulder	39°57′00″N 105°21′38″W	41,920	0.0517	7,290	South Boulder Creek	Gross Dam	
39	Rampart Reservoir	El Paso	38°58′51″N 104°58′12″W	41,000	0.0510	8,006	West Monument Creek	Rampart Dam	
40	Lemon Reservoir	La Plata	37°23′43″N 107°39′43″W	39,792	0.0491	8,130	Florida River	Lemon Dam	

== See also ==
- List of dams and reservoirs in Colorado
- List of largest reservoirs in the United States
- List of rivers of Colorado
- Bibliography of Colorado
- Geography of Colorado
- History of Colorado
- Index of Colorado-related articles
- List of Colorado-related lists
- Outline of Colorado
