= Denver Water =

Water utility in Colorado

Agency overview
- Formed: 1918
- Preceding agency: Denver Union Water Company
- Type: Water infrastructure
- Headquarters: Denver Water Administration Building; 1600 W. 12th Ave. Denver, Colorado; 39.7355°N 105.0099°W
- Employees: 1,160 employees
- Annual budget: US$700 million (fy2023)
- Agency executive: Alan Salazar, CEO/Manager
- Website: www.denverwater.org

Denver Water is a water utility that operates as a public agency serving the City and County of Denver, Colorado, and a portion of its surrounding suburbs. Established in 1918, the utility is funded by water rates and new tap fees. It is Colorado's oldest and largest water utility.

== Overview ==
The challenge for any city in Colorado is the arid character of the countryside. Denver and its suburbs are an artificial oasis in a landscape that would otherwise be nearly without trees or bushes. The amount of water is also quite variable, both from year to year and within each year. The greatest water flows happen in the spring and early summer as the mountain snowpack melts. In order to have water in drier times dams have been constructed to hold back water from wet periods and transmountain diversions from the wetter Colorado Western Slope to the Front Range urban corridor and Eastern Plains have been created.

Denver Water is an independent agency that derives its authority and existence from Article X of the Charter of the City and County of Denver. Though owned and employed by Denver, the property and personnel controlled by the Board of Water Commissioners are referred to as Denver Water. Though they have also, at times, been called the Denver Water Board, the Water Board, and the Denver Water Department. Historically, it was also called the Denver Municipal Water Works in its earliest years. The agency sets it own employment rules subject to the Denver City Charter and Article XX of the Colorado Constitution governing civil service employees.

=== Service area ===
Denver water provides water to the people living in the City and County of Denver as well as 75 contractual distributors in the surrounding suburbs of Denver in the combined service area (CSA). In 2024 this area had an approximate population of 1.5 million people.

=== Water system ===
The sources of Denver's water supply are split almost evenly with half coming from west of the Continental Divide and the Colorado River system and half from tributaries of the South Platte River. In a year without water shortages or other issues around 20% of the total comes from the Fraser River and Williams Fork in Grand County. Another 30% comes from the Blue River, also on the West Slope and the primary water source in the east is the South Platte River itself, with smaller amounts also being sourced from South Boulder Creek, Ralston Creek, and Bear Creek.

There are 17 reservoirs, lakes, or storage complexes that are owned by Denver Water or where it has a right to a portion of the water stored. The largest of these is the Dillon Reservoir with a capacity of 257,304 acre⋅ft (317,380,000 m^{3}). As of 2024, 90% of the storage capacity of the system feeds into the southern collection system. The 10% of storage in the northern system is collected through the Moffat Tunnel and most of the storage is in Gross Reservoir.

Reservoir	Capacity (acre-feet)	Percent	Year
Dillon	257,304	36.7%	1963
Eleven Mile Canyon	97,779	14.0%	1932
Williams Fork	96,822	13.8%	1938
Cheesman	79,064	11.3%	1905
Gross	41,811	6.0%	1954
Chatfield*	28,709	4.1%	1977
Wolford Mountain*	25,610	3.7%	1995
Antero	20,122	2.9%	1909
Marston	19,108	2.7%	1902
Ralston	10,776	1.5%	1937
Strontia Springs	7,864	1.1%	1983
Meadow Creek	5,370	0.8%	1975
South Complex	3,561	0.5%	2009
North Complex	3,495	0.5%	2018
Long Lakes	1,787	0.3%	1873
Platte Canyon	910	0.1%	1904
Soda Lakes*	615	0.1%	
Total:	700,707		
*Denver Water holds rights to only a portion of the total water stored in these reservoirs; only the Denver Water portion is shown.

== History ==
=== Private companies ===
The history of Denver Water is rooted in the private companies, personal water diversions, and government regulation that preceded its creation. The city of Denver itself was only founded in 1859 and at that time the high plains of the shortgrass prairie were widely regarded an "arid desert" as Francis Parkman described it in 1849. Traveling to Bent's Fort he described a water deficient landscape where, "the only vegetation was a few tufts of short grass, dried and shriveled by the heat." The first residents of the Denver area drank water directly from nearby creeks and rivers, using buckets to transport it to residences and businesses.

This was not adequate for a settlement of any size so prior to the creation of Denver Water more than a dozen private water companies were founded in Denver, most of them short lived. The first of these was the Auraria and Cherry Creek Water Company. It was founded in 1859 soon after settlement began, but it made no progress in building any ditches to provide water. The second was the Capitol Hydraulic Company, which was granted a charter by the Kansas Territory legislature in 1860 and began construction the same year. Progress was slow and in 1865 businessman John W. Smith founded the Platte Water Company which bought out Capitol Hydraulic and moved the source upstream on the Platte River. By 1867 the City Ditch had been completed by the company and was delivering water to what is now the Capitol Hill neighborhood. The ditch delivered water to Smith Lake in what became Washington Park. Initially the work was done by hand, but an oxen powered rotary canal builder and railroad excavator was employed later in the construction.

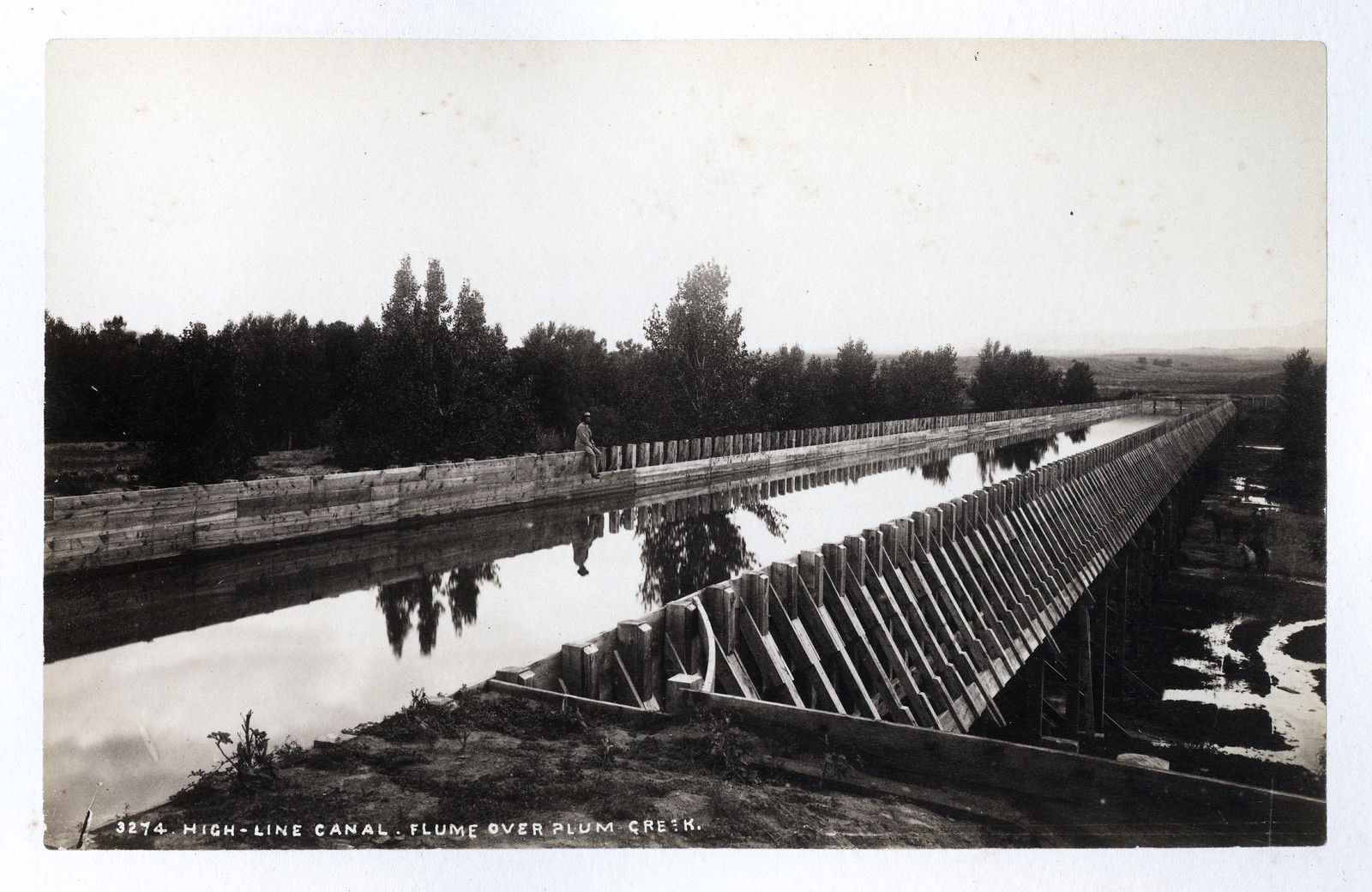
The Highline Canal flume over Plum Creek c. 1882 photographed by William Henry Jackson (1843-1942)

The construction of irrigation systems rapidly transformed Denver and surrounding areas. By 1865 visitors like Albert Richardson reported that Colorado agriculture was quite successful. Ornamental lawns, gardens, and trees were planted in the 1860s and 1870s with visitors reporting on their beauty and success in contrast to earlier narratives of the dry and desolate appearance of the city.

Though successful, the Platte River Company also frequently fell short of expected water deliveries. Critics thought the company had not correctly engineered its system while the company blamed low water in the river. Seeing an opening for competition, businessman James Archer formed the Denver City Water Company in November 1870. The company built a system of pipes fed by a pumping station built near the mouth of Cherry Creek where it empties into the South Platte River. With two pumps built by Holly Manufacturing, this first pumping station was capable of providing 2.5 million US gallons (9,500,000 L) of water each day.

Because the well supplying the pumping station was in the middle of the city, the water became contaminated by the growing population. Between 1879 and 1896 there were at least six major outbreaks of water borne typhoid fever. In response the company built a filtration plant using sand beds in 1889. Together with the 1897 typhoid vaccine and introduction of water chlorination outbreaks of the disease in Denver became rare in the early 20th century.

While private companies were the rule, concerns regarding the stability and cost of supply were growing. In 1874 the territorial legislature amended the Denver city charter allowing it to, "own water works of any description." This enabled the city to purchase Smith's City Ditch in 1882 to continue providing irrigation water to the city's lawns and trees.

Internal squabbling at the Denver Water Company also lead two of its founders, Walter Cheesman and David Moffat, to leave and found the Citizens' Water Company in 1889. This new corporation began purchasing agricultural land and its senior water rights and building works far upstream of the city at the entrance to the Platte Canyon in Jefferson County. A drought in 1890 reduced the flow in the Platte and Citizen's responded with new infrastructure projects for storage including the Ashland Avenue Reservoir, the Alameda Avenue Tank, and Marston Lake.

The competition between Citizens' Water Company and the Denver Water Co. was fierce, but ended with victory for Citizen's in 1894. The renamed Denver Union Water Company purchased the rival company's assets out of receivership and was thereafter the only water provider in Denver.

=== Denver Union Water Company ===
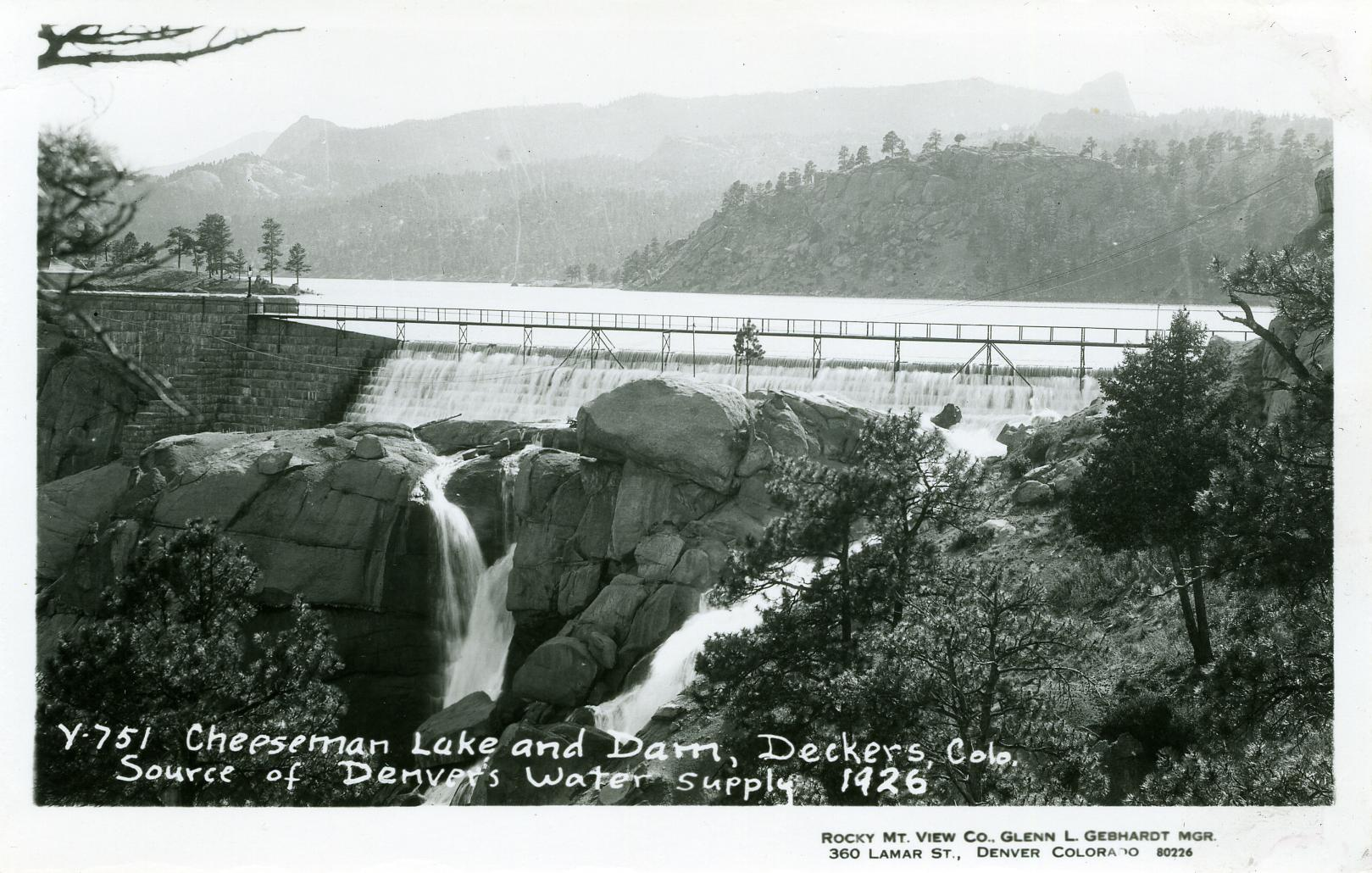
Cheeseman Lake and Dam with water flowing over the spillway, photographed in 1926

The new monopoly did continue with improvements to its infrastructure. The Capitol Hill Reservoir and it pump station were completed in 1899. In order to store more spring runoff for the drier parts of the year plans were made to build a dam and reservoir in the Platte Canyon. The location selected by the company, unlike San Francisco's O'Shaughnessy Dam or the Los Angeles Aqueduct, was neither a beloved natural wonder or settled by farmers so there was no controversy surrounding its construction. The company applied for the needed permissions in 1894 and construction started in the spring of 1899. The construction on the dam was almost complete when spring floods came in 1900. On May 3 the earth fill dam was overtopped and swept away. Work almost immediately began on an improved hybrid arch-gravity design for Cheesman Dam. The second dam was also constructed of masonry where the first had been an earth fill design faced with concrete and steel. The large granite blocks, some weighing as much as 11 short tons (10 t), used to build the dam were cut nearby. Construction of the dam was finished in 1905. At 221 feet in height it was then the tallest dam in the world, a status it would hold for the next seven years.

Moffat had continued to be a major force behind Denver Union Water, but his project to build the Denver and Salt Lake Railway pressed for more funds and he began to try to sell the company to the city. Denver was interested but a price could not be agreed upon. While residents recognized the value of the infrastructure that has been built by the company, they also resented the corruption that had allowed Cheesman and Moffat to acquire valuable natural resources and monopolize the provision of a necessity to the people. During the negotiations the city explored attempting to build a new, city owned system instead of the $9 million price offered in 1898. The city engineer thought that the total value of the system to be $3.75 million and the city council offered $4.7 through a bond issued approved by the voters 29 November 1899. This election question was ruled invalid on technical grounds in 1901, but it made the city unable to proceed with either negotiations or construction of its own system. Negotiations began again as the end of the company's franchise approached in 1910. Independent engineers were hired to appraise the company's assets in 1907 and their March 1909 report valued it at $14.4 million. Both the city and the company rejected this independent valuation. Many rounds of offers, rejections, and litigation followed over the next nine years and Moffat died in 1911. The final valuation of the system was created by attorney W.J. Chinn. This valuation was disputed by the company which took its case all the way to the US Supreme Court, where the valuation was upheld. This finally cleared the way for the sale.

=== Denver Water ===
In 1918, Denver residents voted to form a five-member Board of Water Commissioners and buy the Denver Union Water Company's water system for $14 million, creating Denver Water. From that time on, Denver Water planned and developed a system to meet the needs of the people of Denver and the surrounding areas. The papers making the sale official were signed at a midnight meeting, 1 November 1918 by company president Edwin S. Kassler. The city paid $13,923,576 to the shareholders for the assets of the company with $424 left over from its bond issue.

==== Expansion ====
The population of the city was an estimated 257,000 and so the new agency was immediately faced with the need for more water for the city. Denver Water acquired the Antero Reservoir in Park County, Colorado and Highline Canal for $450,000 in 1924.

The need for water was especially pressing during the droughts of the 1930s in Colorado. In the fall of 1931 the reservoirs were completely drained due to low water flows. On 26 March 1934 a dust storm, part of the larger Dust Bowl, swept into Denver. Conservation drives were made, but at the same time plans were made to divert water from western Colorado.

The next project was the building of Eleven Mile Canyon Reservoir which began in 1930 and was completed in 1932. Planning for the project had begun even before the droughts, with the site where the South Fork of South Platte River enters Eleven Mile Canyon being surveyed in 1926. Like Cheesman Reservoir it is a hybrid arch-gravity dam with much of the force of the water being supported by the canyon walls rather than by the dam alone. With the completion of the new reservoir, it replaced Cheesman as the largest storage facility in the system with a capacity of 97,779 acre⋅ft (120,609,000 m^{3}).

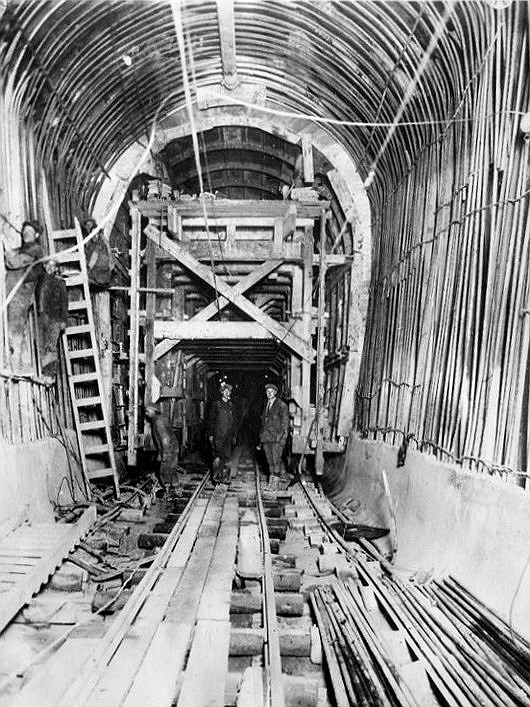
Photo of the interior of the Moffat Tunnel under construction, 1927

To expand beyond just the water provided by the South Platte River the pioneer bore of the Moffat Tunnel was eyed to be used as a transmountain water diversion from the Fraser River. Denver, however, was near bankruptcy in the 1930s due to the Great Depression. To fund the project the city applied to the Public Works Administration (PWA) in October 1933. The Federal Government agreed to donate one million dollars to the project and loan the city the remaining 2.5 million for the project, to be repaid as a lease through city water rates for the next thirty years. On 19 June 1936 water began flowing from the west east through the completed water tunnel. The second part of the project, the Moffat Tunnel Extension Unit, was started in 1935 and completed in 1937. This second tunnel takes the water from the exit of the first tunnel out of Big Dry Creek and into the Ralston Creek watershed for delivery to Denver.

The second transmountain diversion was completed under Jones Pass in 1939 to divert water from the Williams Fork. Today it is known as the Gumlick Tunnel and it continues to direct its water into Clear Creek. As part the tunnel project the Williams Fork Reservoir was built to store water for downstream calls. It was completed in 1938.

Plans for an even more ambitious diversion (eventually named the Roberts Tunnel) were first filed with the Colorado State Engineer in 1927, though it would not start diverting water until 1964. During the Great Depression the land and water rights in and around Dillon, Colorado were purchased by Denver Water for much reduced prices. The biggest obstacles were the legal questions around prior appropriation of the Blue River as a tributary of the Colorado River, but even before they were settled a ground breaking ceremony was held for the tunnel on 24 June 1946. Denver did succeed in gaining a right to Blue River water in 1952, but only half as much as it had initially claimed and with a priority dated to the formal start of tunnel work in 1946. In 1955 bonds for $75 million to construct the project were issued by Denver and after the engineering plans for the reservoir were complete clearing the land started 22 April 1960. The tunnel was completed in May 1962 and the Dillon Reservoir was completed in July 1963. Lawsuits to prevent the completion or filling of the dam continued past 3 September 1963 when the gates of the dam were closed to begin filling the lake, and were finally settled out of court in 1964.

During the period when the Roberts Tunnel and related works were going forward, Denver Water also undertook a project to be able to directly use the water from the earlier Gumlick tunnel. The Vasquez Tunnel, completed in 1958, moves water diverted from the West Slope into Clear Creek back to the West Slope in the Frazer River by way of Vasquez Creek. This allows water from the Williams Fork River to be fed into the northern system through the Moffat Tunnel. To store the water Gross Reservoir was constructed in Boulder County. The dam was dedicated 2 August 1955 in 1955 and at the time was not a controversial project. As part of this project the Williams Fork Reservoir was also expanded to its present size and had a generating plant added in 1959. As soon as these projects were complete Denver Water once again started campaigning for additional projects to plan for future growth of the city.

Though even more ambitious projects were still being planned, in the 1950s officials at Denver Water began to think about limits to what was feasible for the agency to provide. The mechanism they decided upon was to announce a geographic limit to the area where they would contract to provide water. In August 1951 this "blue line" went into effect. Inside the line Denver Water would continue to sign year to year contracts to provide water, but it also would not guarantee supply as it was primarily a Denver city agency. This was a source of disagreement between Denver and the suburbs and also limited Denver Water's ability to sell water at market rates to raise additional revenue until it was repealed in 1960. Then the city charter was also amended to allow water contracts longer than one year.

==== Two Forks era ====
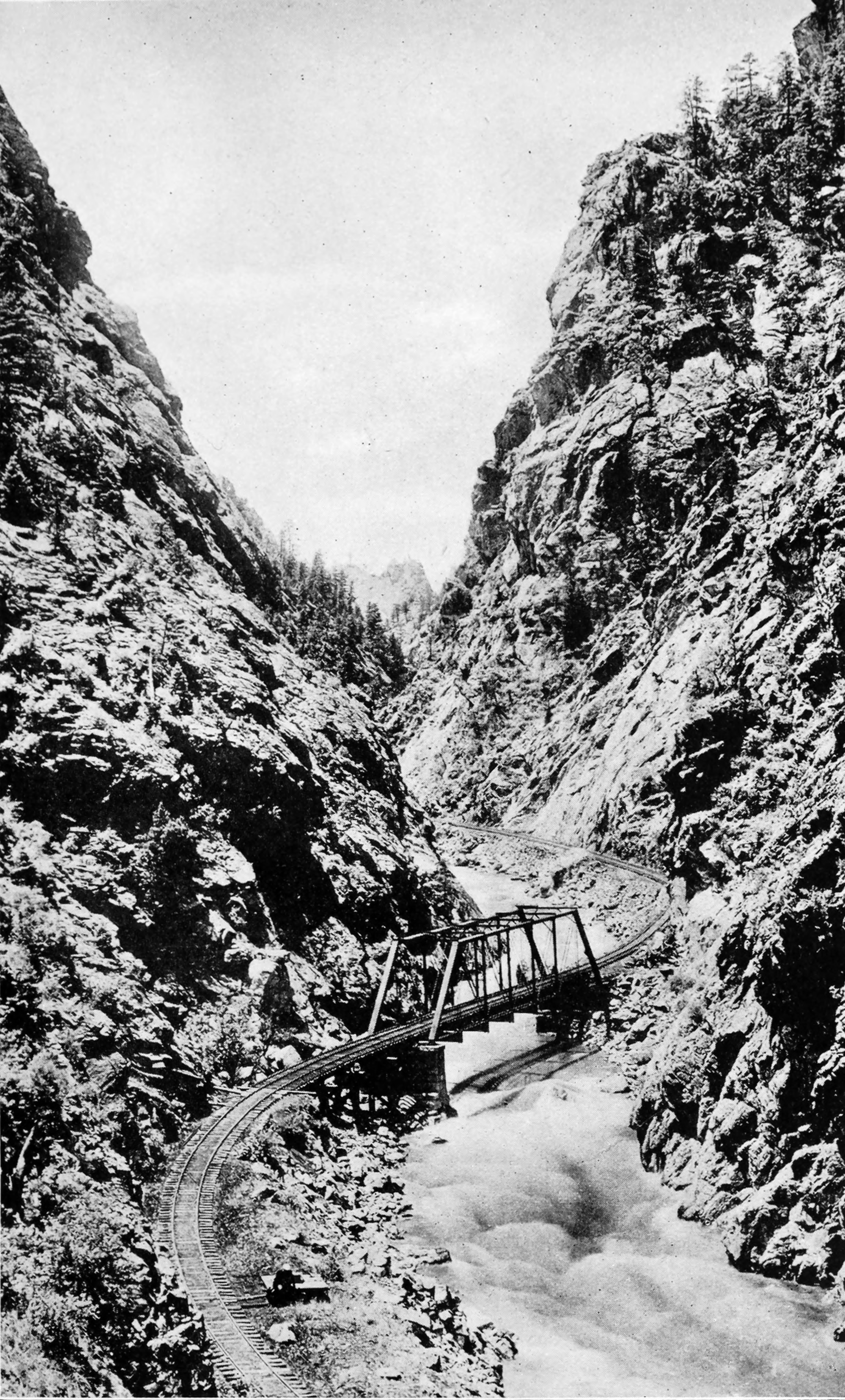
Narrow part of the South Platte River canyon near where the Two Forks Dam would have been built, c. 1922

In 1966 the Bureau of Reclamation proposed the construction of a large new dam just below the confluence of the north and south forks of the South Platte River. A dam had long been contemplated at this site, with the Denver Union Water Company studying the site as early as 1905. In 1965 the location was called, "a perfect dam site," by George Cranmer, Denver's former city manager of public works. The Bureau's plan was to build and operate the dam for the purposes of flood control, electricity generation, and to provide water to both Denver and Aurora. In part the plan was prompted by the 1965 flood of the South Platte River in Denver. The water needed for this project would come from the South Platte River itself. However, nothing came of this proposal. The Denver Water board started to put the pieces in place for its own project in 1972. They proposed a much larger water treatment plant and the Strontia Springs Reservoir to settle water for it. The capacity of the plant would eventually be provided by the Two Forks Dam and it would be provided to Denver and its suburban communities, but the required bond issue was rejected by city voters as too expensive and too environmentally damaging.

The next year Denver Water went ahead with a scaled down version of Foothills Water Treatment Plant and the Strontia Springs Reservoir in a way that would fit with completion of the project at a later date. The smaller 125 million US gal (470 million L) per day capacity and lower cost were acceptable to voters, particularly after two consecutive summers where the existing system was near its capacity. However, environmentalists continued to be strongly opposed to new projects and were quite suspicious that Strontia Springs could also serve as an afterbay for a larger reservoir. The project did not receive the needed permits and approvals from the federal government and several environmental groups filed suit to stop the project. In turn Denver filed suit against the government and the activists that opposed the project. While the process inched forward Denver Water put in place water restrictions and reduced the number of new taps allowed by one third in 1977. The suits were settled through negotiation in 1979 and both the new reservoir and treatment plant were completed by the summer of 1983.

The final form of the Two Forks Dam project was created as an agreement between Denver Water and the suburban water providers finalized in July 1982. The Metropolitan Water Development Agreement apportioned the costs and benefits of the project with 20% being supported by Denver and the remainder by suburban providers. The plan called for a structure standing 615 ft (187 m) tall that would hold enough water for 400,000 more people in the Denver area. Meanwhile the Colorado Environmental Caucus worked to catalogue and publicize the natural environment of the canyon that would be flooded were the project to go ahead. Thirteen and a half miles of free flowing river habitat and the surrounding mountain canyon would be flooded under 1,100,000 acre⋅ft (1.4×10^{9} m^{3}) of water should the dam be filled. In addition the environmental community believed that had not fully explored alternatives or fulfilled the requirements for conservation and metering required under the agreement to build the Foothills Water Treatment Plant.

From 1974 to 1982 the per capita water use in the Denver Water's service area did not change significantly, averaging 188 US gallons (712 L) for each person each day. Much of this water went to outdoor landscaping. For example, in 1980–1987 42% of all water use in Denver's service area went to watering lawns.

As the systemwide environmental-impact statement continued the costs continued to mount, and with the bill approaching $30 million in 1986 the Denver Water board filed for the permits to build Two Forks. The Army Corps of Engineers approved the permits, but the Environmental Protection Agency raised objections. In order to persuade voters in the Denver area the Environmental Defense Fund called the project "financial suicide", presenting arguments that the $440 million cost underestimated a project that would probably end up costing $4.4 billion. On 29 August 1989 Lee DeHihns, the regional administrator of the Environmental Protection Agency, released his report reviewing the project. It found that the adverse effects would be unacceptable and that the project was partly or entirely unnecessary. After public comment about the report the head of the Environmental Protection Agency, William K. Reilly, announced the agency's veto of the project on 23 November 1990. Though it was not a public position of his administration, President George H. W. Bush backed this decision as part of his care for the environment. Though suburban water districts filed suit to challenge the veto in 1991, they were unsuccessful. The Two Forks Project was over after costing more than $40 million.

==== Conservation era ====
On 25 April 1992 an op-ed was published in The Denver Post by the President of the Denver Water Board, Hubert Farbes. The opening line was, "A NEW path for the Denver Water Board is emerging from the fog of confusion that cloaks metro water issues in the aftermath of the U.S. Environmental Protection Agency's veto of the Two Forks project." He went on to say that Denver would not abandon any water rights that it believed to be valid, that the agency would continue to supply its present customers, to engage with suburban water agencies, but that Denver would no longer take a role in developing "major new water supplies for the entire metro area". The veto did not require Denver Water to change its policies or operating practices, but the agency chose to reexamine how it did business. The new manager appointed to lead this change was Hamlet "Chips" Barry III.

In Barry's view it was time for Denver Water "quit fighting with everybody and make some friends." One of the first changes was for Denver Water to create a new, larger division to manage communication with the public. Prior to 1991 the agency had thought it a waste to spend money on public relations with the citizens or to persuade public officials. Almost all of the alternatives suggested by the Environmental Protection Agency and environmental groups were eventually implemented by Denver Water, including environmental mitigation, conservation, and water recycling. Though initially the public declarations of a changed organization were met with skepticism by other agencies and interest groups as it still had massive clout due to its very senior water rights and massive infrastructure for moving it around the state.

The narrative of change in response to the veto of Two Forks is complicated by reality that Denver Water was already changing before the veto. In the 1920s there were already initiatives to encourage users to not waste water. In 1957 all new taps were required to be metered and by 1992 all homes had them installed. This allowed the introduction of higher rates for customers using larger amounts of water which started in 1990. Part of what ultimately doomed Two Forks was the 1977 Foothills Settlement Decree with the Environmental Protection Agency that required a program of water conservation. As part of these efforts, Nancy Leavitt, a secretary working for Denver Water coined the word xeriscape in 1981 from the Greek xeros meaning dry and also the botanical meaning of drought combined with landscape.

Though conservation campaigns had long been a part of Denver Water's operations, it gained greater emphasis in the 1990s. The agency hired Sukle Advertising to create humorous ads that would attract more attention to the cause with slogans like, "Instead of a Dishwasher, Get a Dog." More effort was put into promoting xeriscaping, and in 1996 it published the Xeriscape Plant Guide in collaboration with the American Water Works Association. The average per person water use did start to come down in 2000s. Prior to 2002 the per person rate, including industrial and commercial uses with residential uses, was averaging 211 US gallons (799 L) per day. This dropped by 19% to 171 US gallons (647 L) per day.

Not all projects were cancelled. Denver Water had contracted with the Colorado River Water Conservation District for part of the water in the planned Wolford Mountain Reservoir. This twenty-five year lease had been intended to provide exchange water, water released from elsewhere in the watershed to compensate for water diverted elsewhere. This would have allowed Denver to divert more water from its West Slope sources while Two Forks was being constructed. Instead of pulling out Chips Barry met with the district and worked out a deal to provide more financing in exchange for a lease that could be later converted into permanent ownership of 40% of the water. In 1994 Barry also met with irrigators from the Grand Junction, Colorado area to address their concerns over the saltier water that would be released from Wolford.

In the 1990s Denver Water began to experience increasing problems relating to forest health. Increased temperatures and drought hurt the health of the forests in the watersheds and around the reservoirs. The weakened trees succumbed to insects and disease, and then to fire. In 1996 the Buffalo Creek fire burned above the Strontia Springs Reservoir and in 2002 the Hayman Fire burned an enormous area in the South Platte River basin and reached the edge of Cheesman Reservoir. Without the trees and vegetation to protect the landscape ash, soil, and debris were carried downstream into the reservoirs. To address this, Denver Water began replanting mountainsides with drought-resistant trees in order to better maintain its waterways in 2010.

The fires in the South Platte River watershed pushed Denver Water to consider plans for expansion, this time to make the water system more resistant to disasters. During the Two Forks conflict environmental groups had suggested the expansion of Gross Reservoir in the northern system. Denver Water saw value in having more storage in this part of the system to insure against the possibility of a wildfire reducing the water available in the southern system. The project began in 2003 with application for the permits necessary to raise the height of the dam. The permitting and planning process took fourteen years, with Denver Water receiving permission from the Federal Government in 2017. However, lawsuits between Denver Water and environmental groups and Boulder County continued for years. Boulder finally settled with Denver in 2021, getting and additional $12.5 million in funds for reducing environmental and residential impacts. Though county commissioners only accepted reluctantly as their goal was to stop the expansion entirely.

==== Lead service pipes ====
Lead pipes were used to hook homes to water mains until the World War II era. Although lead pipes were banned in 1971, Denver Water officials estimated in 2021 that there are between 64,000 and 84,000 homes still being serviced with lead pipes. A $500 million program to replace them is proceeding at the rate of about 5,000 homes a year. Whether a particular address has a lead service line may be searched for on a page on the Denver Water website. As of 2024 the total number of service lines replaced was 21,000.

==== Potable Water Reuse ====
Between 1979 and 1990, Denver Water carried out a $30 million, in collaboration with the United States Environmental Protection Agency to assess the safety, quality, technical feasibility, and public and regulatory acceptance of direct potable water reuse. They were able to process a million gallons of water per day.

== See also ==
- Colorado Public Utilities Commission
