= Marston Lake =

Reservoir in Denver, Colorado

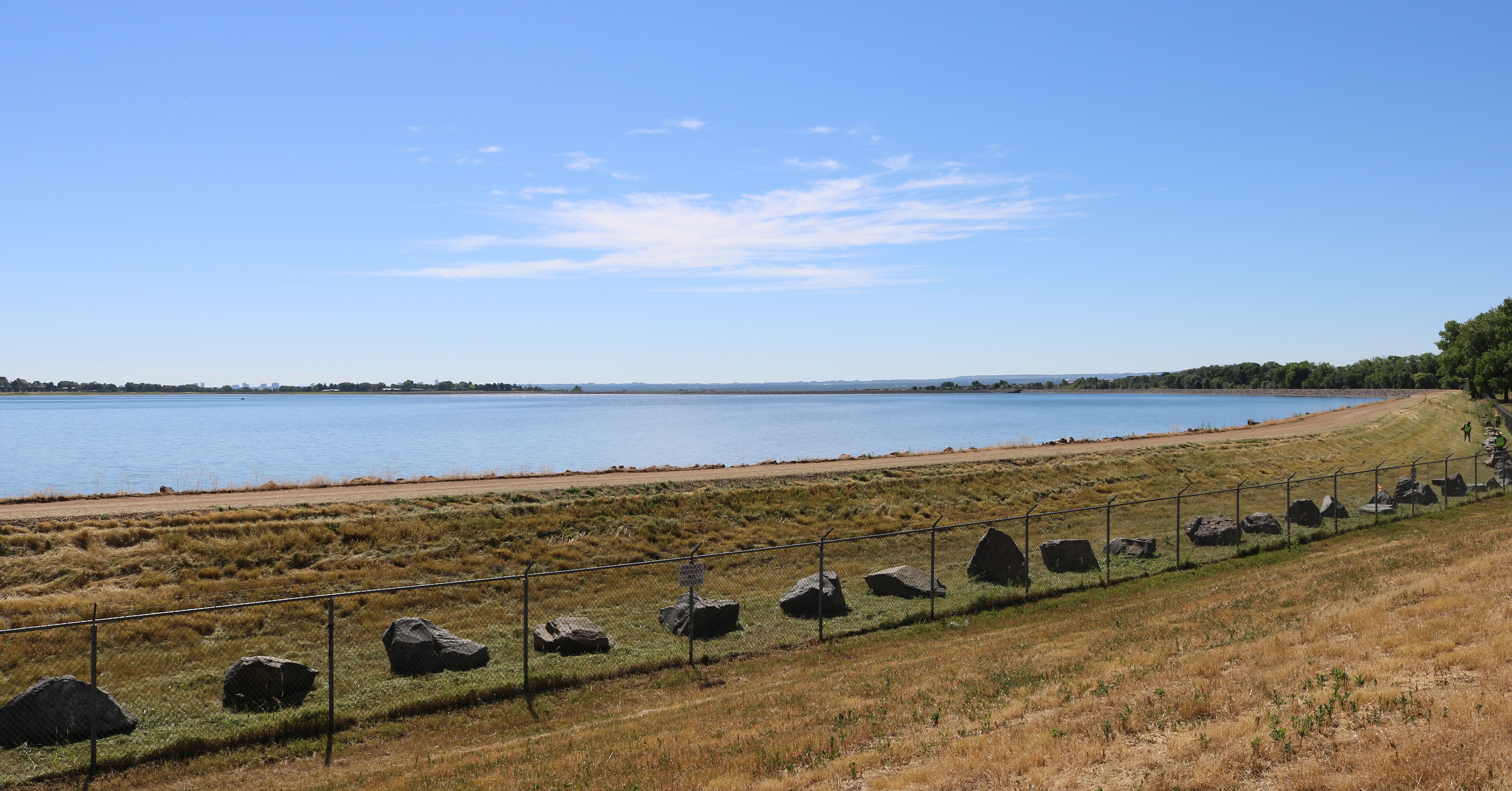
- The lake in 2016.

- Location within Colorado Location within the United States
- Location: Denver, Colorado
- Coordinates: 39°37′48″N 105°04′04″W
- Primary inflows: South Platte River
- Basin countries: United States
- Managing agency: Denver Water
- Water volume: 19,795 acre⋅ft (24,417,000 m^{3})
- Surface elevation: 5,525 ft (1,684 m)

Marston Lake is a reservoir in Denver, Colorado. It is owned by Denver Water and was completed in 1902. The reservoir sends water to the Marston treatment plant, and from there the water is distributed to Denver residents.

The reservoir receives water from the South Platte River. The river receives water from the Colorado Western Slope through a transmountain diversion via the Roberts Tunnel.

== Climate ==
According to the Köppen Climate Classification system, Marston Lake has a cold semi-arid climate, abbreviated "BSk" on climate maps. The hottest temperature recorded at Marston Lake was 104 °F (40 °C) on July 18, 1998, while the coldest temperature recorded was −19 °F (−28 °C) on December 31, 2014.

Climate data for Marston Filter Plant, Colorado, 1991–2020 normals, extremes 1998–present
Month	Jan	Feb	Mar	Apr	May	Jun	Jul	Aug	Sep	Oct	Nov	Dec	Year
Record high °F (°C)	72 (22)	77 (25)	81 (27)	84 (29)	96 (36)	100 (38)	102 (39)	104 (40)	97 (36)	87 (31)	80 (27)	73 (23)	104 (40)
Mean maximum °F (°C)	65.5 (18.6)	66.7 (19.3)	74.5 (23.6)	78.4 (25.8)	85.1 (29.5)	95.2 (35.1)	96.6 (35.9)	94.4 (34.7)	91.8 (33.2)	82.3 (27.9)	74.4 (23.6)	65.5 (18.6)	97.7 (36.5)
Mean daily maximum °F (°C)	45.8 (7.7)	46.5 (8.1)	54.6 (12.6)	60.1 (15.6)	69.0 (20.6)	80.8 (27.1)	86.4 (30.2)	85.0 (29.4)	77.2 (25.1)	64.2 (17.9)	53.4 (11.9)	45.4 (7.4)	64.0 (17.8)
Daily mean °F (°C)	32.6 (0.3)	33.4 (0.8)	41.3 (5.2)	47.3 (8.5)	56.4 (13.6)	67.1 (19.5)	73.0 (22.8)	71.3 (21.8)	63.0 (17.2)	50.4 (10.2)	40.6 (4.8)	32.8 (0.4)	50.8 (10.4)
Mean daily minimum °F (°C)	19.3 (−7.1)	20.3 (−6.5)	28.1 (−2.2)	34.5 (1.4)	43.8 (6.6)	53.4 (11.9)	59.5 (15.3)	57.5 (14.2)	48.7 (9.3)	36.7 (2.6)	27.7 (−2.4)	20.2 (−6.6)	37.5 (3.0)
Mean minimum °F (°C)	0.0 (−17.8)	−0.3 (−17.9)	12.1 (−11.1)	20.5 (−6.4)	29.9 (−1.2)	44.1 (6.7)	53.1 (11.7)	49.1 (9.5)	38.3 (3.5)	21.8 (−5.7)	11.7 (−11.3)	−1.7 (−18.7)	−7.6 (−22.0)
Record low °F (°C)	−8 (−22)	−16 (−27)	−6 (−21)	6 (−14)	15 (−9)	31 (−1)	49 (9)	42 (6)	29 (−2)	7 (−14)	−6 (−21)	−19 (−28)	−19 (−28)
Average precipitation inches (mm)	0.48 (12)	0.67 (17)	1.19 (30)	2.07 (53)	2.73 (69)	1.87 (47)	2.05 (52)	1.85 (47)	1.26 (32)	1.04 (26)	0.74 (19)	0.61 (15)	16.56 (419)
Average snowfall inches (cm)	6.3 (16)	6.2 (16)	5.4 (14)	4.1 (10)	0.8 (2.0)	0.0 (0.0)	0.0 (0.0)	0.0 (0.0)	0.0 (0.0)	1.7 (4.3)	3.7 (9.4)	5.9 (15)	34.1 (86.7)
Average precipitation days (≥ 0.01 in)	4.1	4.4	5.1	7.2	9.8	7.7	8.3	9.0	6.0	5.1	3.7	3.9	74.3
Average snowy days (≥ 0.1 in)	3.3	4.0	3.3	1.9	0.5	0.0	0.0	0.0	0.0	0.9	2.0	3.4	19.3
Source 1: NOAA
Source 2: National Weather Service (mean maxima and minima 2006–2020)

== See also ==
- List of reservoirs in Colorado
