= Bonny Dam =

Dam in Yuma County, Colorado, US

Coordinates: 39°37′28″N 102°10′26″W

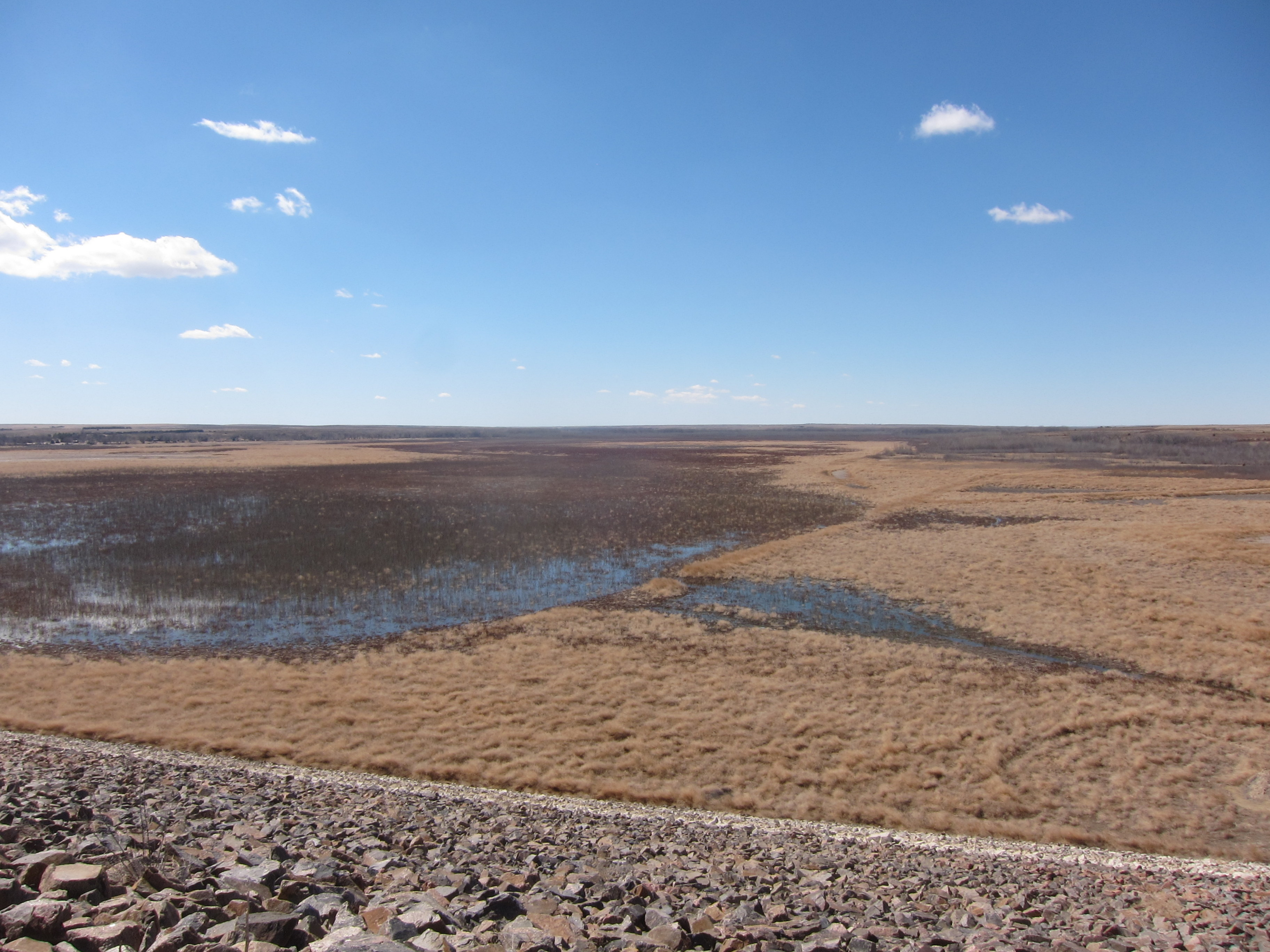
- Interactive map of Bonny Dam
- Status: Operational
- Opening date: 1951

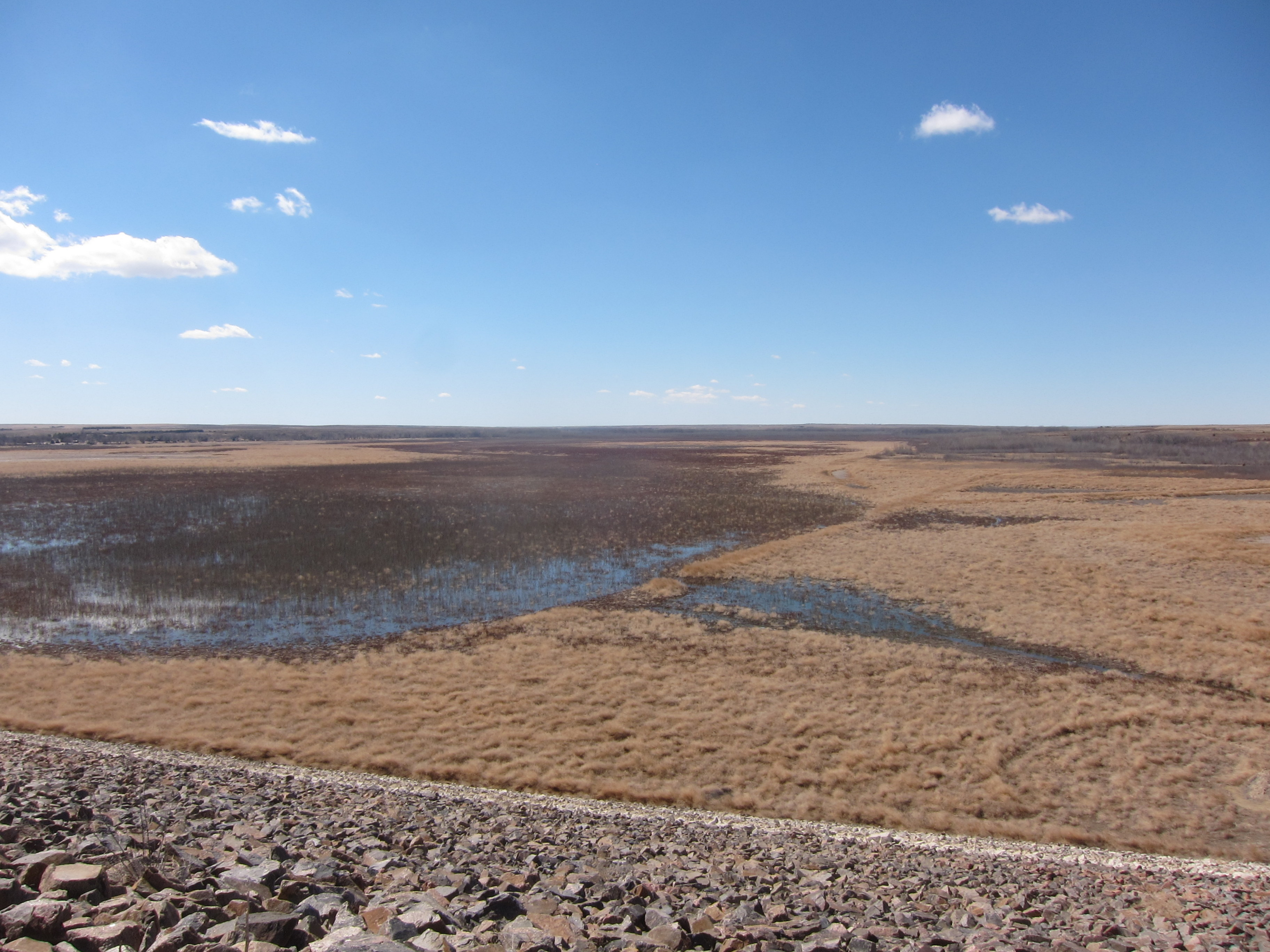

Bonny Dam (National ID # CO01300) is a dam in Yuma County, Colorado, in the eastern part of the state.

The earthen dam was constructed between 1948 and 1951 by the United States Bureau of Reclamation, with a height of 158 feet (48 m) and 9,200 feet (2,800 m) long at its crest. It impounds the South Fork of the Republican River for flood control, irrigation storage and recreation, as part of the Bureau's extensive Pick-Sloan Missouri Basin Program. The dam is owned and operated by the Bureau.

The reservoir it creates, Bonny Reservoir, was drained in 2011. It formerly had a water surface area of over 2,000 acres (810 ha), a maximum capacity of 170,160 acre-feet (209,890,000 m^{3}), and a shoreline of about 15 miles (24 km). All water was released downstream to flow across the Kansas state border, about 6 miles (10 km) to the east, to satisfy a May 2003 United States Supreme Court decision on a dispute arising from the Republican River Compact.

In September and October 2011, Bonny Lake was drained and many of the Bonny Lake State Park's services were eliminated, including the fishery and the visitors' center. The dam structure remains. The park is now being operated as part of the South Republican River State Wildlife Area.

== See also ==
- List of largest reservoirs of Colorado
