= Brice Canyon =

Canyon in La Plata County, Colorado, United States

- Brice Draw
- Location within Colorado
- Floor elevation: 6,647 feet (2,026 m)

Geography
- Location: La Plata County, Colorado, United States
- Coordinates: 37°12′15″N 107°44′58″W
- River: Florida River
- Interactive map of Brice Canyon

Brice Canyon (also known as the Brice Draw), is a canyon in southeast–central La Plata County, Colorado, United States. Its mouth is located at an elevation of 6,647 feet (2,026 m) along the Florida River. The southern part of the canyon is located in the Southern Ute Indian Reservation.
