= Roberts Tunnel =

Water tunnel in Colorado

Coordinates: 39°27′41.55″N 105°40′40.49″W

The Harold D. Roberts Tunnel, commonly known as the Roberts Tunnel, is a 23.3-mile trans-basin water diversion tunnel constructed to transport water from the Blue River Basin on Colorado’s Western Slope to the North Fork of the South Platte River on the Eastern Slope. It is considered one of the world’s longest water tunnels. Completed in 1962 after 6 years of construction, the tunnel remains a critical component of the city of Denver’s water infrastructure. It was designed to address the growing water demands of the Denver metropolitan area, particularly during periods of drought and urban expansion in the mid-20th century. The tunnel begins at Dillon Reservoir in Summit County and terminates near Grant in Park County, traversing beneath the Continental Divide at depths exceeding 4,000 feet.

== History ==
Planning for the Roberts Tunnel began as early as 1914, when Denver Water initiated geological investigations to explore the feasibility of diverting water from the Blue River Basin. These studies continued intermittently until 1956, when a construction contract was awarded following decades of hydrological analysis and engineering design. The tunnel was constructed by the Army Corps of Engineers. It was named in honor of Harold D. Roberts, the Denver Board of Water Commissioner’s lead attorney, whose leadership was instrumental in the project’s development. The tunnel’s completion was a major step in Colorado’s water management, allowing water to cross the Continental Divide and help meet Denver’s rising needs.

Construction began by sinking a 900-foot shaft near the town of Montezuma, which allowed crews to dig in four directions simultaneously, accelerating the construction timeline despite the challenging geological conditions. The tunnel itself is 10.25 feet in diameter and was excavated using air-powered jackhammers and rail carts, a method reminiscent of early mining techniques. The facility was built to transport 788 second-feet of water with hydraulic gradient of 0.00145 and a velocity of 9.55 feet per second. The tunnel’s alignment includes a slight dogleg, a deviation from a straight path necessitated by subsurface rock formations and fault zones.

The U.S. Geological Survey documented the engineering geology of the tunnel extensively, highlighting the use of steel sets and emergency support measures to stabilize the tunnel during excavation. The agency reported that part of the problems encountered during construction included the complex physical properties of the rocks encountered along the centerline of the tunnel. The tunnel traverses complex rock formations, including granitic and metamorphic units, as well as fault zones that required adaptive engineering solutions. Problems also included the inflow of groundwater at high pressure.

== Operation ==
Water enters the Roberts Tunnel through a gated drain at the bottom of Dillon Reservoir, Denver Water’s largest reservoir. When operational, the tunnel can deliver more than 480 million gallons of water per day to the Front Range. The water emerges at the tunnel’s east portal and flows into the North Fork of the South Platte River, eventually reaching Denver’s treatment and distribution systems. The tunnel’s capacity and reliability have made it indispensable to Denver Water’s long-term planning and drought mitigation strategies. The infrastructure sustains more than 1.3 million people.

Aside from transporting water, the Roberts Tunnel also generates electricity for Denver Water. At the tunnel’s exit point, on the North Fork river near Grant, a 6-megawatt hydroelectric facility was built. Its output is enough to supply the energy demands of 4,500 homes.

Routine inspection and maintenance of the Roberts Tunnel are conducted every five years. During these inspections, the tunnel is drained to allow engineers to drive through its entire length and assess structural integrity. Inspection teams look for signs of cracking, shifting, or other anomalies in the concrete lining. In 2012, Denver Water officials reported that the tunnel remains in "excellent condition", and a 2016 inspection showed no defects.
