= Eleven Mile State Park =

State park in Colorado, United States

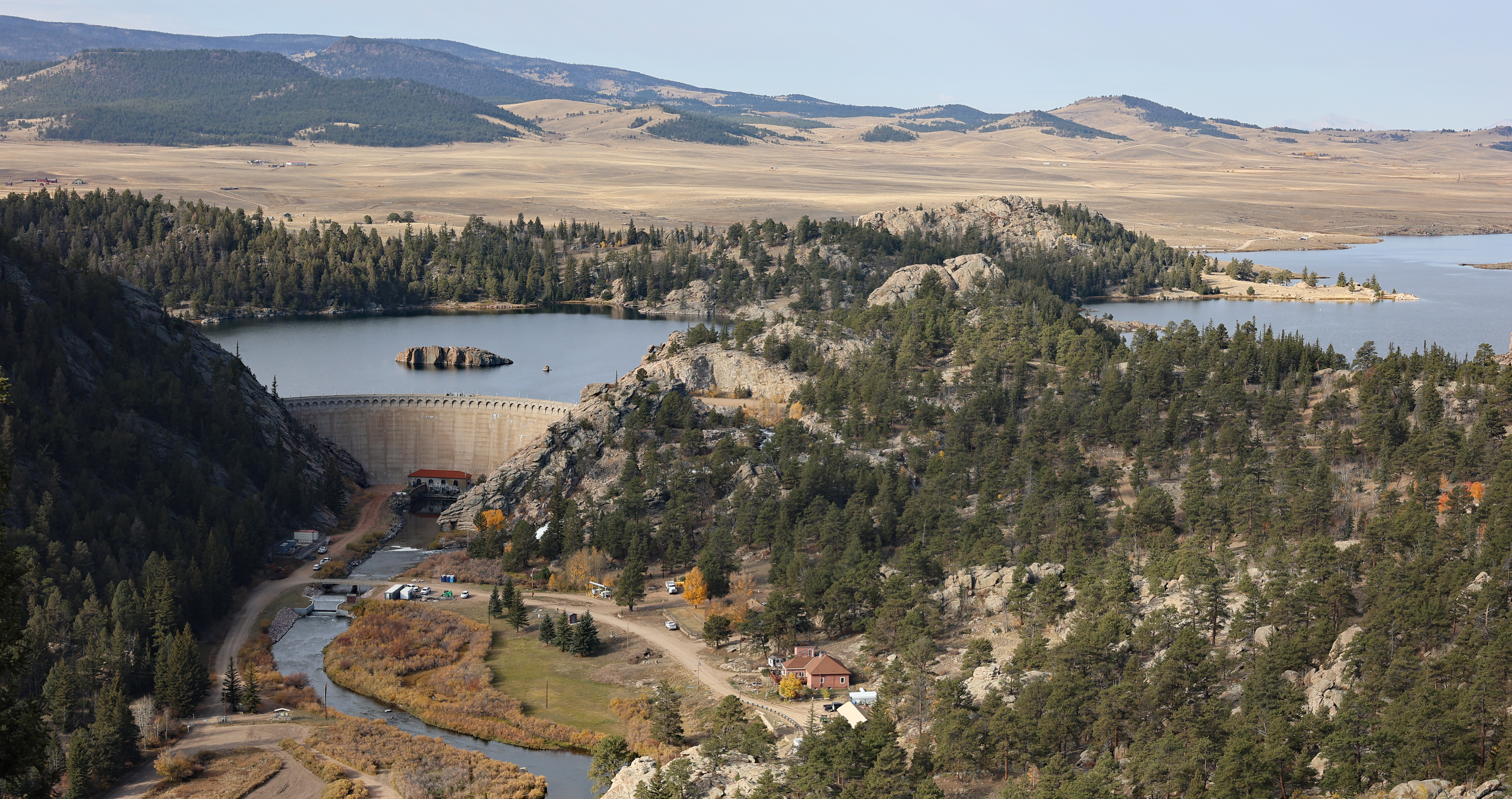
- The dam and reservoir (2024)

- Location within Colorado
- Location: Park County, Colorado, United States
- Nearest city: Lake George, Colorado
- Coordinates: 38°56′08″N 105°30′03″W
- Area: 7,662 acres (31.01 km^{2})
- Created: 1970
- Operator: Colorado Parks and Wildlife
- Visitors: 406,483 (in 2021)

Eleven Mile State Park is a Colorado State Park located in Park County, 11 miles (18 km) south of Lake George, Colorado, United States. Established in 1970, the 7,662-acre (31.01 km^{2}) park surrounds 3,405-acre (13.78 km^{2}), 5.5 miles (8.9 km) long Eleven Mile Canyon Reservoir. The reservoir itself was completed in 1932 by Denver Water. Facilities include a marina, a visitors center and over 300 campsites. There are 5 miles (8.0 km) of trails available for hikers and bicyclists. Fish species include cutthroat, rainbow, brown trout and northern pike. Eleven Mile Reservoir is famous for the thriving Kokanee salmon population found in the river current along the north side of the reservoir known as the Dream Stream. This reservoir is also known for being very windy in the afternoon. A required daily vehicle park pass can be obtained at the entrance of the park. Daily species possession limits are as follows: trout, 4 total, two over 16" and two under 16", or four under 16"; salmon, 10; pike and crawdads, unlimited. Cottontail rabbit, white-tailed jackrabbit, coyote, muskrat and ground squirrels are commonly seen in the park. Mule deer, pronghorn, porcupine, badger, black bear and elk are seen occasionally.

== Dam and reservoir ==
Completed in 1932, the Eleven Mile Dam is owned by the Denver Board of Water Commissioners and stores water for municipal use in Denver. The dam, NID ID# CO00359, is a concrete arch dam that is 151 feet (46 meters) high and 375 feet (114 meters) long. It impounds the South Platte River and is in Park County, Colorado. The reservoir, Eleven Mile Reservoir, can store up to 128,000 acre-feet (158,000,000 cubic meters) of water. Its surface area is 3,500 acres (1,400 hectares). The dam and reservoir are located within the South Park National Heritage Area. The reservoir's elevation is 8,567 feet (2,611 meters).

== Eleven Mile Canyon Recreation Area ==
Below the reservoir, and outside the boundaries of the Eleven Mile State Park, lies Elevenmile Canyon, elevation 7,927 feet (2,416 meters). Originally called Granite Canyon, the long canyon lies within the Pike National Forest and makes up the Eleven Mile Canyon Recreation Area. The Midland Railway used to follow the canyon on its route to Western Colorado. Three of its tunnels are still on the road that winds up the canyon to a point just below the dam. The recreation area is popular with anglers, rock climbers, and picnickers.
