= Antero Reservoir =

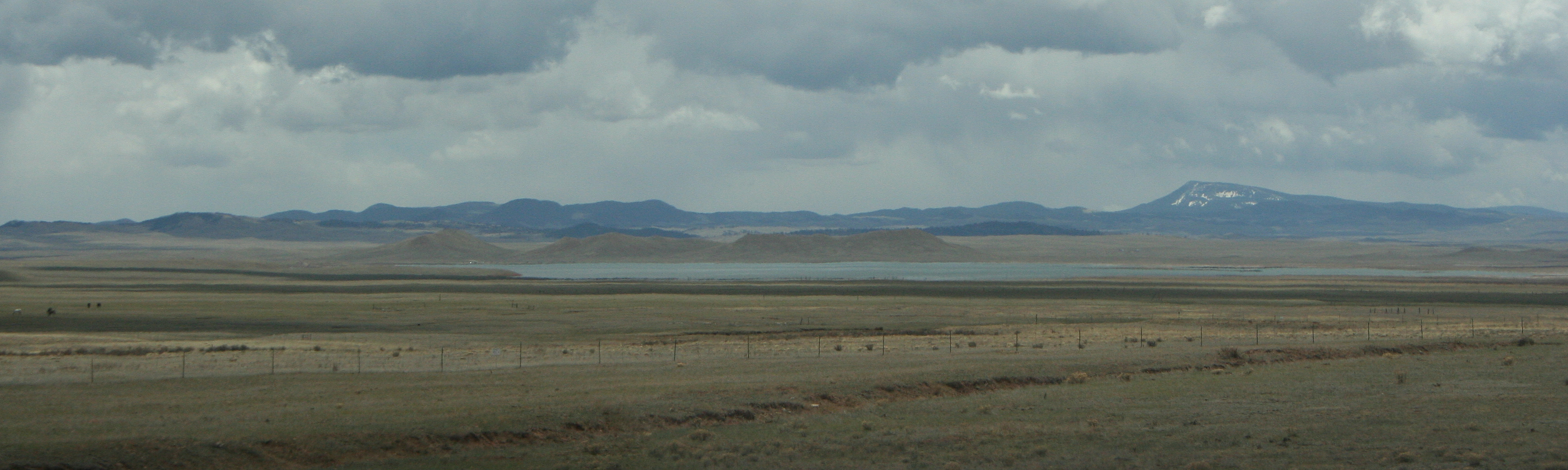
- The reservoir from Highway 285.

- Location within Colorado Location within the United States
- Location: Park County, Colorado
- Coordinates: 38°59′15″N 105°53′56″W
- Type: reservoir
- Basin countries: United States
- Surface area: 2,500 acres (1,000 ha)
- Water volume: 20,000 acre⋅ft (25,000,000 m^{3})
- Surface elevation: 8,944 ft (2,726 m)

Antero Reservoir is a reservoir in the US state of Colorado. It was created by the first dam placed on the South Platte River in Park County, central Colorado. It is owned by Denver Water and supplies drinking water to the greater Denver metro region almost 140 miles (230 km) away.

== History ==
Built in 1909, the earthen dam sat on a site believed by geologists to be a dry lake bed some 300 years old. This lake, named Green Lake, lies submerged in Antero Reservoir.

Denver Water acquired the reservoir property in 1924, along with the High Line Canal, and it has remained a part of the Denver Water system since 1924.

The Reservoir was closed in 2002 for five years due to drought. The lake went completely dry, and Colorado Parks and Wildlife, in concert with Denver Water resurrected it in 2007. The Colorado Division of Wildlife re-stocked the lake with rainbow trout, brook trout, cutbow, cutthroat trout, brown trout, and splake.

In 2011, engineers began lowering the water level by two feet due to excess seepage. The dam has leaked since its construction, requiring it to operate under state restrictions.

Beginning in May 2013, Antero reservoir was planned to have been drained because of drought conditions. It was not drained because of substantial snowfall in April 2013. In 2013, a $17 million project to rehabilitate the dam began. The reservoir was then expected to be drained in 2015 for necessary repairs, with re-filling in 2016. In the event, Denver Water began to empty the reservoir in June 2015 for "significant repairs to Antero Dam".

== Climate ==
A weather station is operated at the reservoir site. It is notable for recording very cold temperatures, even by comparison to other sites of a similar elevation, when cold air pooling affects the reservoir site but not the more open areas around it. This is because the reservoir is surrounded by even higher terrain on all sides, leading to sinking air when the wind is calm. According to the Köppen Climate Classification system, Antero Reservoir has a cold semi-arid climate, abbreviated "BSk" on climate maps. The record low temperature of −54.0 °F (−47.8 °C) was registered on 10 January 1962 in Antero Reservoir.

Climate data for Antero Reservoir, Colorado, 1991–2020 normals, extremes 1961–present
Month	Jan	Feb	Mar	Apr	May	Jun	Jul	Aug	Sep	Oct	Nov	Dec	Year
Record high °F (°C)	60 (16)	58 (14)	65 (18)	72 (22)	81 (27)	88 (31)	88 (31)	87 (31)	84 (29)	78 (26)	68 (20)	60 (16)	88 (31)
Mean maximum °F (°C)	49.2 (9.6)	49.1 (9.5)	57.6 (14.2)	64.0 (17.8)	73.2 (22.9)	82.3 (27.9)	84.2 (29.0)	81.1 (27.3)	77.6 (25.3)	70.2 (21.2)	59.4 (15.2)	50.4 (10.2)	84.6 (29.2)
Mean daily maximum °F (°C)	31.6 (−0.2)	33.5 (0.8)	41.9 (5.5)	48.8 (9.3)	58.8 (14.9)	70.3 (21.3)	75.6 (24.2)	72.7 (22.6)	66.7 (19.3)	55.2 (12.9)	42.3 (5.7)	31.6 (−0.2)	52.4 (11.3)
Daily mean °F (°C)	13.7 (−10.2)	16.3 (−8.7)	26.1 (−3.3)	33.8 (1.0)	43.1 (6.2)	52.4 (11.3)	58.1 (14.5)	56.0 (13.3)	48.6 (9.2)	37.1 (2.8)	25.5 (−3.6)	14.6 (−9.7)	35.4 (1.9)
Mean daily minimum °F (°C)	−4.3 (−20.2)	−0.9 (−18.3)	10.2 (−12.1)	18.9 (−7.3)	27.4 (−2.6)	34.4 (1.3)	40.5 (4.7)	39.3 (4.1)	30.4 (−0.9)	19.0 (−7.2)	8.7 (−12.9)	−2.4 (−19.1)	18.4 (−7.5)
Mean minimum °F (°C)	−28.0 (−33.3)	−26.1 (−32.3)	−13.4 (−25.2)	2.5 (−16.4)	13.6 (−10.2)	25.1 (−3.8)	33.2 (0.7)	31.4 (−0.3)	19.9 (−6.7)	0.6 (−17.4)	−14.0 (−25.6)	−27.8 (−33.2)	−34.9 (−37.2)
Record low °F (°C)	−54 (−48)	−51 (−46)	−43 (−42)	−29 (−34)	0 (−18)	15 (−9)	23 (−5)	19 (−7)	3 (−16)	−22 (−30)	−33 (−36)	−49 (−45)	−54 (−48)
Average precipitation inches (mm)	0.28 (7.1)	0.36 (9.1)	0.54 (14)	0.67 (17)	1.24 (31)	0.90 (23)	1.96 (50)	2.18 (55)	1.03 (26)	0.70 (18)	0.33 (8.4)	0.37 (9.4)	10.56 (268)
Average snowfall inches (cm)	5.4 (14)	6.2 (16)	8.3 (21)	9.3 (24)	4.0 (10)	0.0 (0.0)	0.0 (0.0)	0.0 (0.0)	0.4 (1.0)	4.2 (11)	4.9 (12)	6.5 (17)	49.2 (126)
Average precipitation days (≥ 0.01 in)	3.2	4.1	5.0	5.6	7.1	6.0	11.7	12.6	6.6	5.2	3.9	4.0	75.0
Average snowy days (≥ 0.1 in)	2.4	3.1	3.3	3.5	1.4	0.0	0.0	0.0	0.1	1.7	2.4	2.9	20.8
Source 1: NOAA
Source 2: National Weather Service

== Fishing ==
The shallowness of this reservoir makes it relatively warm for the location and altitude. This makes for exceptionally large, fast growing fish. Antero Reservoir is owned by Denver Water and overseen by Colorado Parks and Wildlife. Because it is not a state park, there are no fees for entry. Fishing is year-round, with ice fishing in the winter. A valid fishing license is required.

== Stats ==
Elevation: 8,944 feet (2,726 m), Capacity: 20,000 acre⋅ft (25,000,000 m^{3}), Surface area: 2,500 acres (1,000 ha).
