= Gross Reservoir =

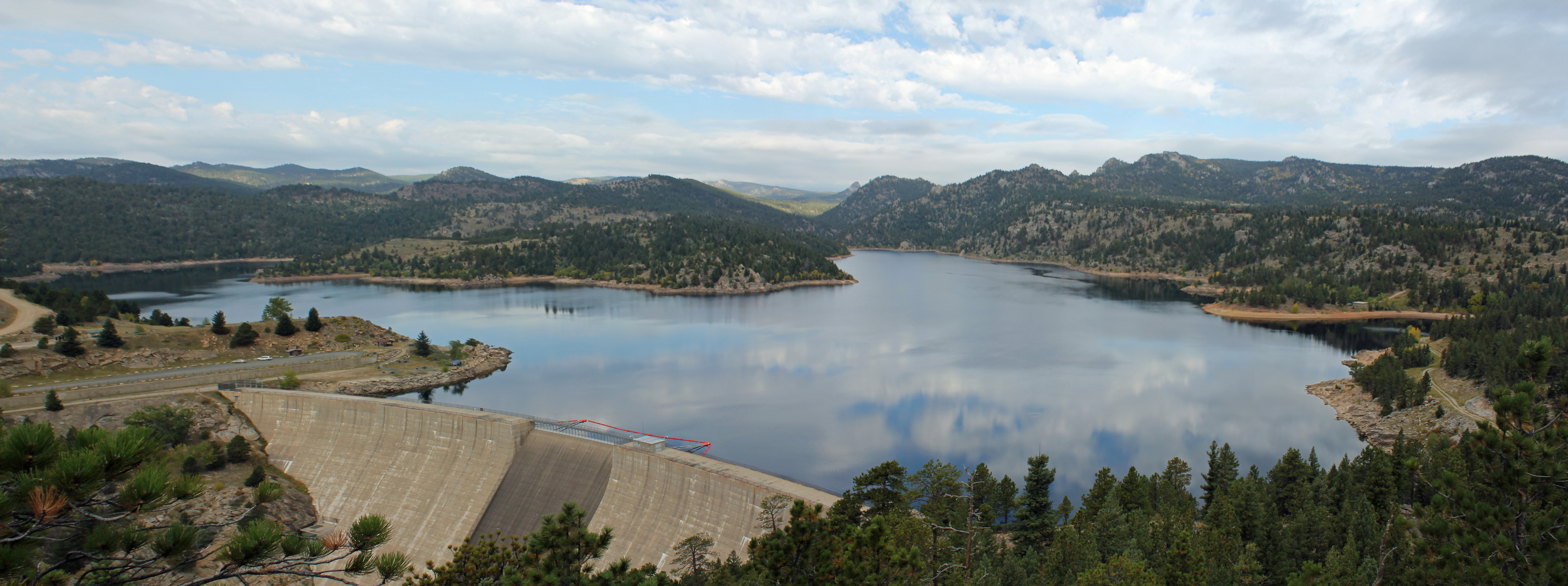
- The reservoir in 2014.

- Location within Colorado Location within the United States
- Location: Boulder County, Colorado
- Coordinates: 39°56′31″N 105°22′22″W
- Type: reservoir
- Etymology: Named for Denver Water former Chief Engineer Dwight D. Gross.
- Primary outflows: South Boulder Creek
- Basin countries: United States
- Managing agency: Denver Water
- Surface area: 440 acres (180 ha) (original); 842 acres (341 ha) (expanded)
- Water volume: 41,811 acre⋅ft (51,573,000 m^{3}) (original); 118,811 acre⋅ft (146,551,000 m^{3}) (expanded)
- Surface elevation: 2,222 m (7,290 ft)

Gross Reservoir, located in Boulder County, Colorado, is owned and operated by Denver Water. Completed in 1954, the reservoir has a surface area of 440 acres (180 ha), and the spillway sits at 7,225 feet (2,202 m) elevation. The reservoir is undergoing an expansion project.

The reservoir receives water from South Boulder Creek and the western side of the Continental Divide through the Moffat Tunnel. South Boulder Creek flows out of the 340-foot high dam (100 m).

== Recreation ==
The reservoir provides opportunities for fishing (including ice fishing), hiking, canoeing, kayaking, and some camping. No water-contact activities such as swimming or wading are allowed. Only non-motorized boats are permitted.

== Expansion project ==
The proposed expansion of Gross Reservoir would allow Denver Water to store an additional 77,000 acre-feet (95,000,000 m^{3}) of water, drawn mostly from the Fraser and Williams Fork Rivers. Construction on the project, expected to be complete around 2027, will raise the level of the dam by 131 feet (40 meters), resulting in an additional 77,000 acre-feet (95,000,000 cubic meters) of water storage capacity in the reservoir and making it the tallest dam in Colorado.

Denver Water applied to the U.S. Army Corps of Engineers for a permit under section 404 of the Clean Water Act, required to construct the expansion, and that permit was granted in 2017. In response, several environmental groups sued USACE on grounds that the agency's deliberations about granting the permit violated the Clean Water Act, Endangered Species Act, and National Environmental Policy Act. In July 2020 the Federal Energy Regulatory Commission granted a required modification to the Federal Power Act license granted to Colorado Water for Gross Dam before it was built.

A contract for design services was awarded to Stantec, an engineering consulting firm, in 2017.

Boulder County announced in spring 2019 that it would require Denver Water to obtain a land use permit under Colorado law before commencing the expansion project. Denver Water submitted its application for that permit in September 2020. Boulder County commissioners approved the expansion in 2021 and accepted a $12.5 million mitigation deal.

== Climate ==
The hottest temperature recorded at Gross Reservoir was 94 °F (34.4 °C) on July 9, 2003, June 23, 2012, June 26, 2012, and June 22, 2016, while the coldest temperature recorded was −24 °F (−31.1 °C) on February 2, 2011.

Climate data for Gross Reservoir, Colorado, 1991–2020 normals, extremes 1978–present
Month	Jan	Feb	Mar	Apr	May	Jun	Jul	Aug	Sep	Oct	Nov	Dec	Year
Record high °F (°C)	67 (19)	64 (18)	72 (22)	78 (26)	89 (32)	94 (34)	94 (34)	92 (33)	91 (33)	81 (27)	70 (21)	64 (18)	94 (34)
Mean maximum °F (°C)	57.7 (14.3)	58.1 (14.5)	66.3 (19.1)	72.3 (22.4)	78.7 (25.9)	88.0 (31.1)	89.8 (32.1)	87.7 (30.9)	84.7 (29.3)	75.5 (24.2)	66.5 (19.2)	58.1 (14.5)	91.0 (32.8)
Mean daily maximum °F (°C)	39.3 (4.1)	39.7 (4.3)	47.2 (8.4)	52.2 (11.2)	60.8 (16.0)	72.6 (22.6)	79.3 (26.3)	77.1 (25.1)	69.7 (20.9)	56.8 (13.8)	47.0 (8.3)	39.5 (4.2)	56.8 (13.8)
Daily mean °F (°C)	28.1 (−2.2)	28.2 (−2.1)	34.7 (1.5)	39.7 (4.3)	48.1 (8.9)	58.1 (14.5)	64.5 (18.1)	62.3 (16.8)	55.2 (12.9)	44.1 (6.7)	35.3 (1.8)	28.5 (−1.9)	43.9 (6.6)
Mean daily minimum °F (°C)	16.9 (−8.4)	16.7 (−8.5)	22.1 (−5.5)	27.1 (−2.7)	35.4 (1.9)	43.6 (6.4)	49.6 (9.8)	47.6 (8.7)	40.6 (4.8)	31.3 (−0.4)	23.5 (−4.7)	17.5 (−8.1)	31.0 (−0.6)
Mean minimum °F (°C)	−4.5 (−20.3)	−6.1 (−21.2)	5.4 (−14.8)	13.7 (−10.2)	23.3 (−4.8)	35.7 (2.1)	43.9 (6.6)	40.0 (4.4)	30.6 (−0.8)	15.5 (−9.2)	4.9 (−15.1)	−5.2 (−20.7)	−11.8 (−24.3)
Record low °F (°C)	−13 (−25)	−24 (−31)	−14 (−26)	0 (−18)	11 (−12)	28 (−2)	35 (2)	27 (−3)	16 (−9)	−1 (−18)	−14 (−26)	−19 (−28)	−24 (−31)
Average precipitation inches (mm)	0.71 (18)	0.90 (23)	1.94 (49)	2.73 (69)	2.89 (73)	1.87 (47)	2.04 (52)	2.12 (54)	1.99 (51)	1.35 (34)	0.96 (24)	0.78 (20)	20.28 (514)
Average snowfall inches (cm)	9.4 (24)	14.0 (36)	21.0 (53)	19.8 (50)	3.9 (9.9)	0.1 (0.25)	0.0 (0.0)	0.0 (0.0)	0.9 (2.3)	6.9 (18)	12.0 (30)	11.1 (28)	99.1 (251.45)
Average extreme snow depth inches (cm)	7.7 (20)	8.2 (21)	11.3 (29)	10.4 (26)	3.4 (8.6)	0.0 (0.0)	0.0 (0.0)	0.0 (0.0)	0.9 (2.3)	5.1 (13)	7.3 (19)	7.9 (20)	18.4 (47)
Average precipitation days (≥ 0.01 in)	4.7	5.6	6.3	8.4	10.5	8.1	10.2	10.9	7.3	6.0	4.9	4.9	87.8
Average snowy days (≥ 0.1 in)	4.0	4.7	4.8	4.6	1.3	0.0	0.0	0.0	0.4	1.9	3.8	4.0	29.5
Source 1: NOAA
Source 2: National Weather Service

== See also ==
- List of largest reservoirs of Colorado
- List of reservoirs in Colorado
