= Lemon Dam =

Coordinates: 37°22′56″N 107°39′37″W

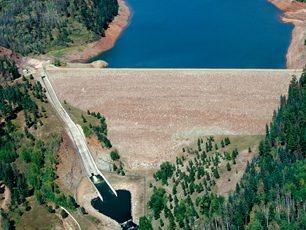
- Interactive map of Lemon Dam
- Country: United States
- Location: La Plata County, Colorado
- Purpose: Irrigation, flood control, hydroelectric generation
- Status: Operational
- Opening date: 1963
- Designed by: United States Bureau of Reclamation
- Operator: Florida Water Conservancy District

Dam and spillways
- Impounds: Florida River
- Height: 284 ft (87 m)
- Length: 1,360 ft (410 m)

Reservoir
- Creates: Lemon Reservoir
- Total capacity: 40,145 acre-feet (49,518,000 cubic meters)
- Normal elevation: 2,478 m (8,130 ft)

Power Station
- Installed capacity: 120 kW

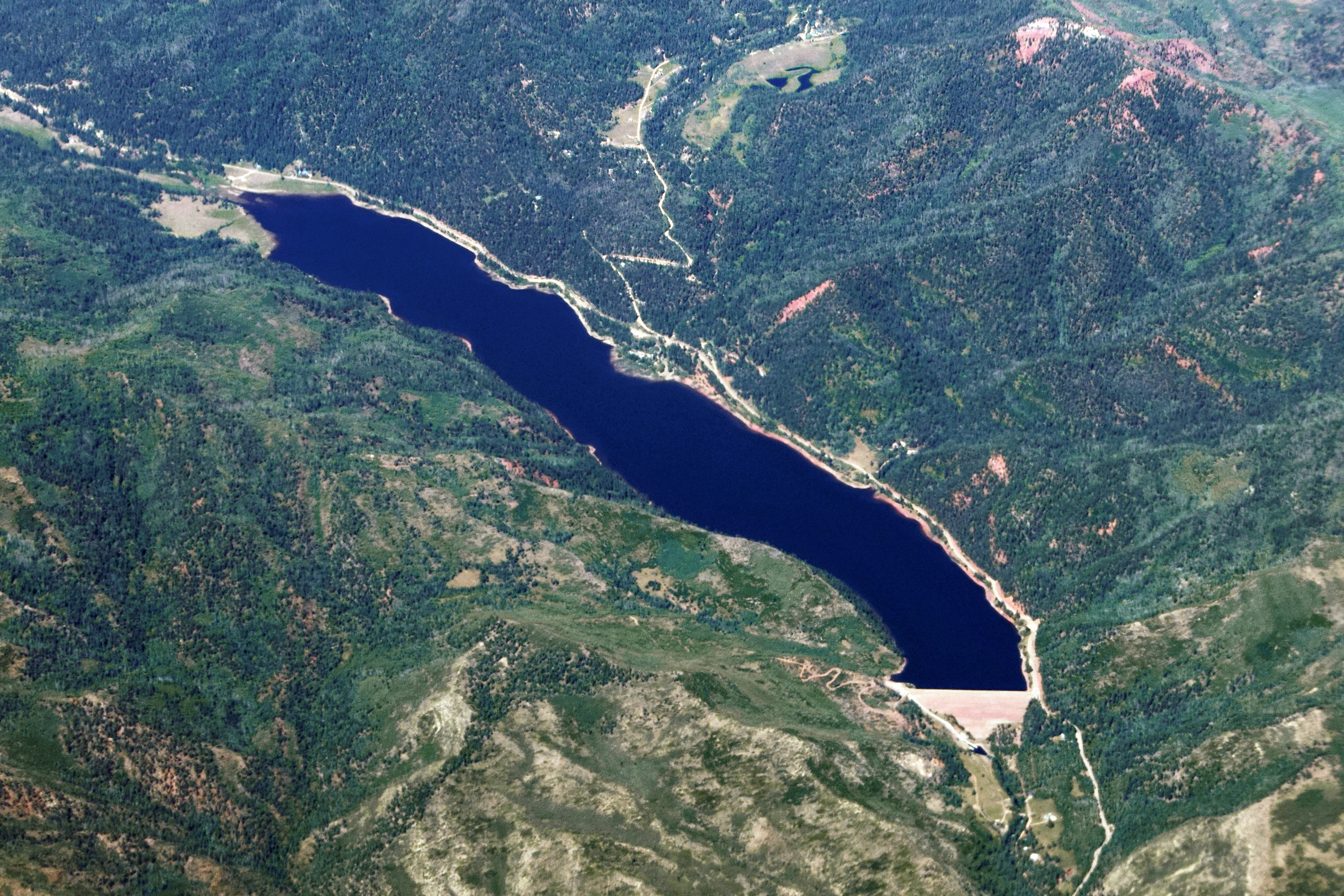
Aerial view of the Lemon Reservoir

Lemon Dam is an earthen dam, and is a project of the United States Bureau of Reclamation. It was completed in 1963, at 284 feet (87 m) high and 1,360 feet (410 m) long at its crest. The dam impounds the Florida River for flood control and irrigation water storage, operated by the local Florida Water Conservancy District. 120 kW of hydroelectric power is generated here.

Lemon Reservoir is about three miles (4.8 km) long, one-half mile (0.8 km) wide, has a total surface area of 622 acres (252 ha) and a total capacity of 40,145 acre-feet (49,518,000 cubic meters).

== Climate ==
Lemon Dam has a humid continental climate(Köppen Dfb).

Climate data for Lemon Dam, Colorado, 1991–2020 normals, 1982-2020 extremes: 8110ft (2472m)
Month	Jan	Feb	Mar	Apr	May	Jun	Jul	Aug	Sep	Oct	Nov	Dec	Year
Record high °F (°C)	61 (16)	61 (16)	71 (22)	75 (24)	89 (32)	90 (32)	95 (35)	90 (32)	89 (32)	78 (26)	69 (21)	62 (17)	95 (35)
Mean maximum °F (°C)	50.5 (10.3)	52.2 (11.2)	61.3 (16.3)	68.3 (20.2)	76.6 (24.8)	84.7 (29.3)	88.0 (31.1)	84.8 (29.3)	80.9 (27.2)	72.4 (22.4)	60.7 (15.9)	51.9 (11.1)	88.5 (31.4)
Mean daily maximum °F (°C)	37.0 (2.8)	39.6 (4.2)	47.1 (8.4)	54.1 (12.3)	63.1 (17.3)	74.7 (23.7)	79.0 (26.1)	76.3 (24.6)	69.9 (21.1)	58.6 (14.8)	46.3 (7.9)	37.3 (2.9)	56.9 (13.8)
Daily mean °F (°C)	23.2 (−4.9)	25.5 (−3.6)	33.2 (0.7)	40.2 (4.6)	49.0 (9.4)	58.6 (14.8)	63.9 (17.7)	61.9 (16.6)	55.6 (13.1)	45.1 (7.3)	34.1 (1.2)	25.2 (−3.8)	43.0 (6.1)
Mean daily minimum °F (°C)	9.3 (−12.6)	11.4 (−11.4)	19.3 (−7.1)	26.3 (−3.2)	34.8 (1.6)	42.5 (5.8)	48.7 (9.3)	47.5 (8.6)	41.3 (5.2)	31.6 (−0.2)	21.8 (−5.7)	13.1 (−10.5)	29.0 (−1.7)
Mean minimum °F (°C)	−7.6 (−22.0)	−6.3 (−21.3)	1.5 (−16.9)	13.3 (−10.4)	24.1 (−4.4)	32.0 (0.0)	41.2 (5.1)	40.2 (4.6)	29.6 (−1.3)	18.2 (−7.7)	5.0 (−15.0)	−4.7 (−20.4)	−10.1 (−23.4)
Record low °F (°C)	−19 (−28)	−26 (−32)	−10 (−23)	2 (−17)	15 (−9)	25 (−4)	32 (0)	31 (−1)	22 (−6)	7 (−14)	−8 (−22)	−21 (−29)	−26 (−32)
Average precipitation inches (mm)	2.70 (69)	2.48 (63)	1.97 (50)	1.63 (41)	1.63 (41)	0.95 (24)	3.04 (77)	3.48 (88)	3.43 (87)	2.50 (64)	2.07 (53)	2.41 (61)	28.29 (718)
Average snowfall inches (cm)	29.10 (73.9)	28.50 (72.4)	18.90 (48.0)	9.80 (24.9)	1.70 (4.3)	0.00 (0.00)	0.00 (0.00)	0.00 (0.00)	0.00 (0.00)	3.00 (7.6)	14.10 (35.8)	25.90 (65.8)	131 (332.7)
Source 1: NOAA
Source 2: XMACIS2 (records & monthly max/mins)

== See also ==
- List of largest reservoirs of Colorado
