= Muddy Creek (Colorado) =

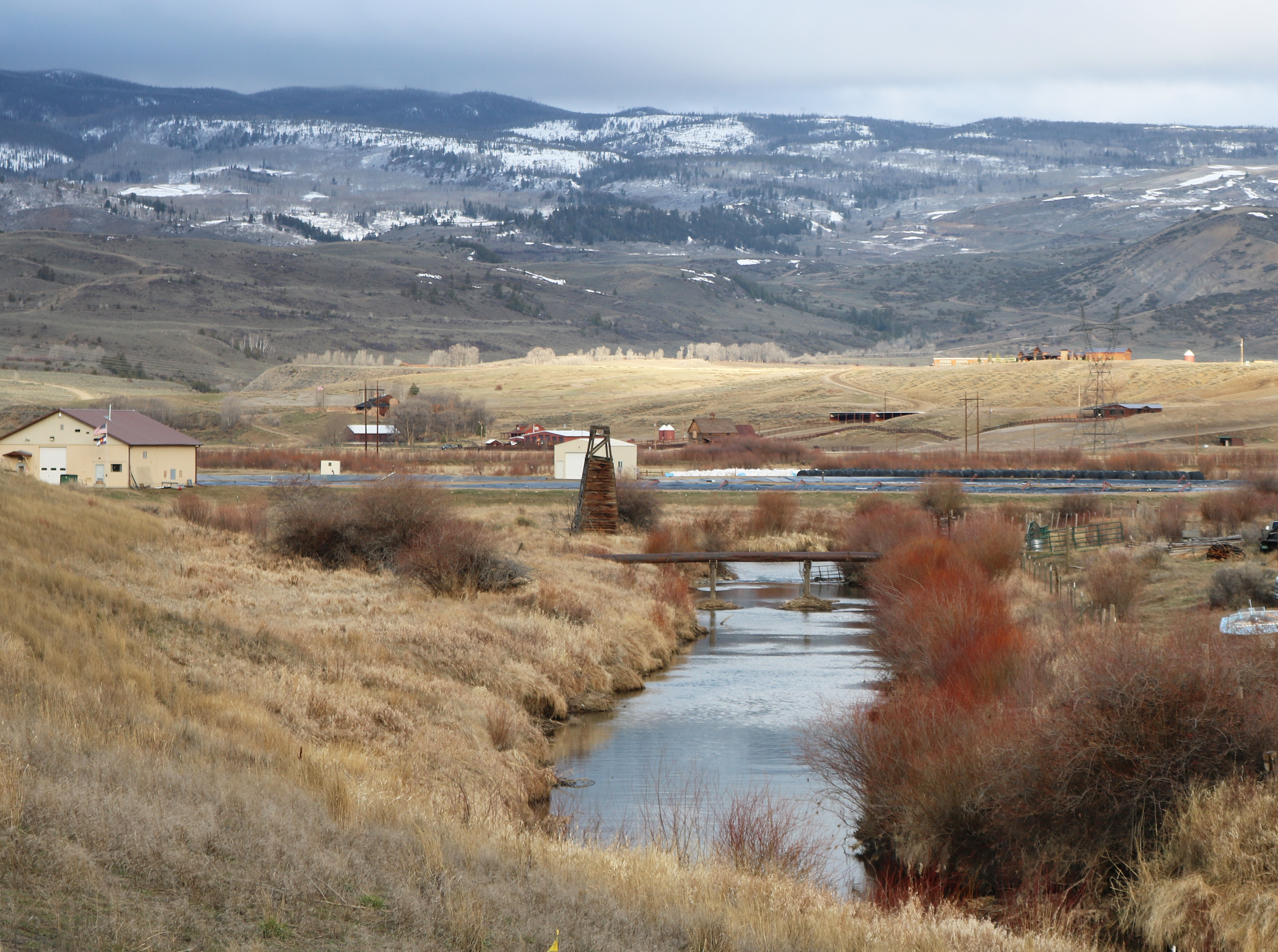
- The creek in Kremmling, just before it empties into the Colorado River.

Physical characteristics
- Source
  - coordinates: 40°25′48″N 106°38′29″W
- Mouth
  - location: Confluence with Colorado River
  - coordinates: 40°02′35″N 106°23′52″W
  - elevation: 7,338 ft (2,237 m)

Basin features
- Progression: Colorado

Muddy Creek is a tributary of the Colorado River, approximately 60.5 miles (97.4 km) long, in north central Colorado in the United States.

It rises in northwestern Grand County, in the Routt National Forest west of Rabbit Ears Pass at the continental divide. It flows south, east, then southwest, and joins the Colorado near Kremmling.

== Wolford Mountain Reservoir ==
The creek was dammed in 1996 to create the Wolford Mountain Reservoir, which forms part of the Wolford Mountain Recreation Area.

== See also ==
- List of rivers of Colorado
- List of tributaries of the Colorado River
