= Bonny Lake State Park =

Former state park in Yuma County, Colorado

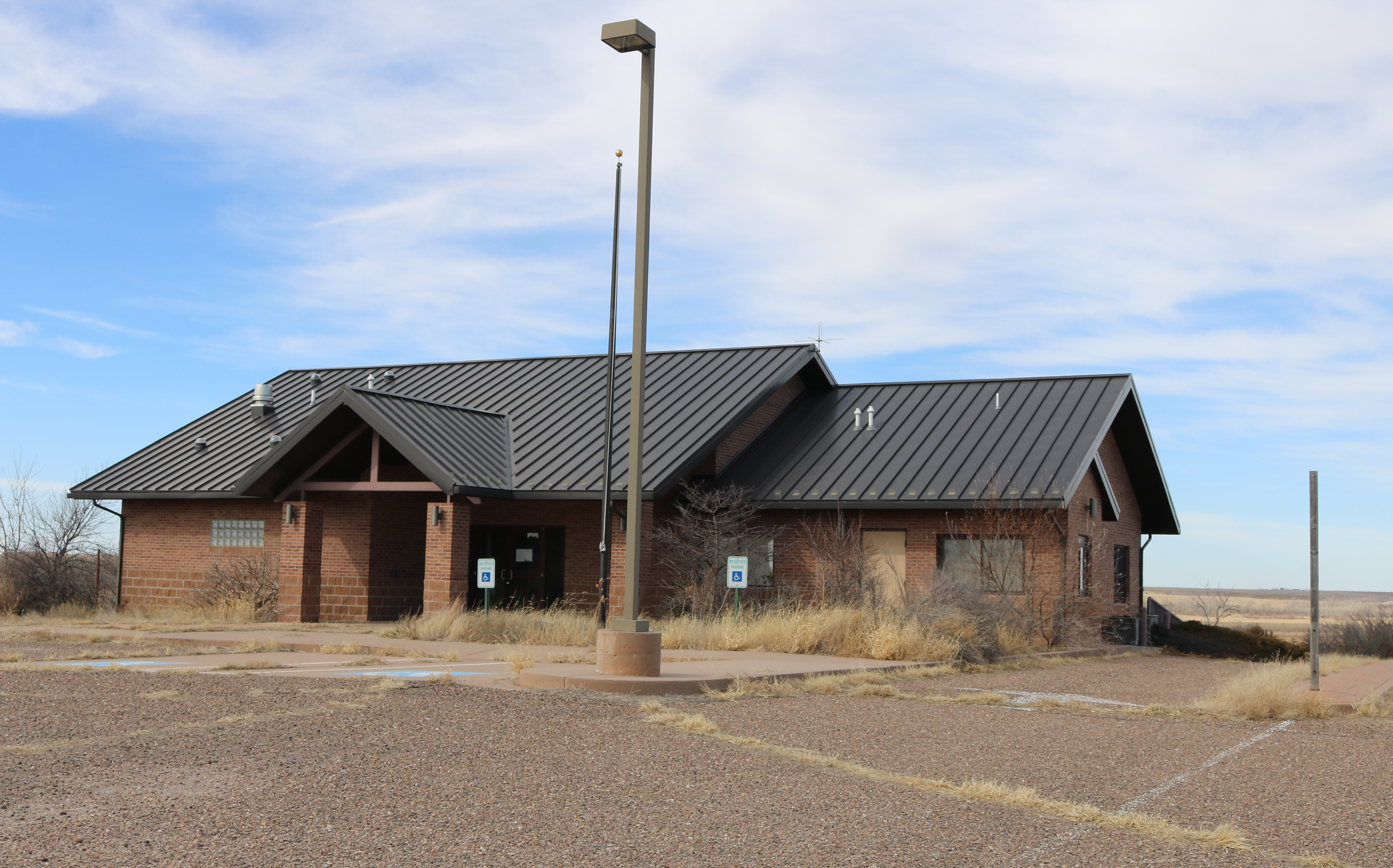
- The former park's visitors' center, now abandoned.

- Location within Colorado
- Location: Yuma County, Colorado, USA
- Nearest city: Burlington, CO
- Coordinates: 39°36′22″N 102°11′19″W
- Area: 4,793 acres (19.40 km^{2})
- Established: 1966 (closed as a state park in 2011)
- Governing body: Colorado Parks and Wildlife

Bonny Lake State Park is a former state park located in Yuma County, Colorado near Hale. Created in 1966 and closed in 2011, Bonny Lake was the easternmost state park in Colorado.

== History ==
In September and October 2011, Bonny Reservoir was drained and the park was permanently closed. The former park is now being operated as part of the South Republican River State Wildlife Area.

== Wildlife ==
More than 300 different species of birds were seen in the park, including bald eagles there are also many species of waterfowl over the winter months that including green-wing teal, widgeon, pintails, mallards, wood ducks, blue-wing teal, Canada geese, snow geese, and sandhill cranes. Mammal species found in the park include beaver, cottontail rabbit, coyote, deer (both mule deer and white-tailed deer), jackrabbit, muskrat, opossum, raccoon, thirteen-lined ground squirrel, and weasel.
