= Colorado River Water Conservation District =

State agency of Colorado, United States

The Colorado River Water Conservation District, commonly referred to as the Colorado River District or more simply the "River District," is a public water planning and policy agency for the U.S. state of Colorado that was created in 1937 pursuant to the Water Conservancy District Act of Colorado. This is the same legislation that enabled the creation of the Northern Colorado Water Conservancy District, "Northern Water" and the Colorado Water Conservation Board, "CWCB". All of these entities were created in the era of public works investments and economic development under the Franklin D. Roosevelt Administration following the Great Depression and the Dust Bowl.

== History ==
The history of the Colorado River District is described in Water Wranglers: The 75-Year History of the Colorado River District: A Story about the Embattled Colorado River and the Growth of the West. The book details the often contentious nature of water development in Colorado. It is a familiar story that has been told throughout the arid west: those needing water supplies often resorted to water exporting project that moved water great distances from the source in the headwaters of the Colorado River Basin to feed farms and growing cities in the east, leaving less developed areas to the west with diminished water supplies.

In 2012, Colorado water users marked the 75th anniversary of the River District (as well as Northern Water and the CWCB) and a public education campaign was initiated to raise public awareness about the critical importance of Colorado as a headwaters state and the responsibilities that come with it. In particular, the unequal distribution of water resources and population across the state and especially across the great continental divide was publicized. Since that time, drought and increasing competition for limited water resources has led to a critical public policy debate and raised the profile of the River District. In other words, because of geographical twist of fate, most of the state's precipitation falls (generally as snow) high on the west side of the Continental Divide, and unfortunately the demand for those water resources come from the more populated areas on the drier, east side of the divide.

In 2020, voters in the 15 counties that make up the district passed a property-tax increase to further support the district's operations. According to the district, 86% of the revenue the tax hike generates will go towards keeping water on the Western Slope, protecting Western Slope ranchers' and farmers' water supply, protecting drinking water, and protecting fish, wildlife, and recreation.

== Location ==
The agency is based in Glenwood Springs, Colorado.
