= Florida River =

Tributary of the Animas River in La Plata County, Colorado, United States

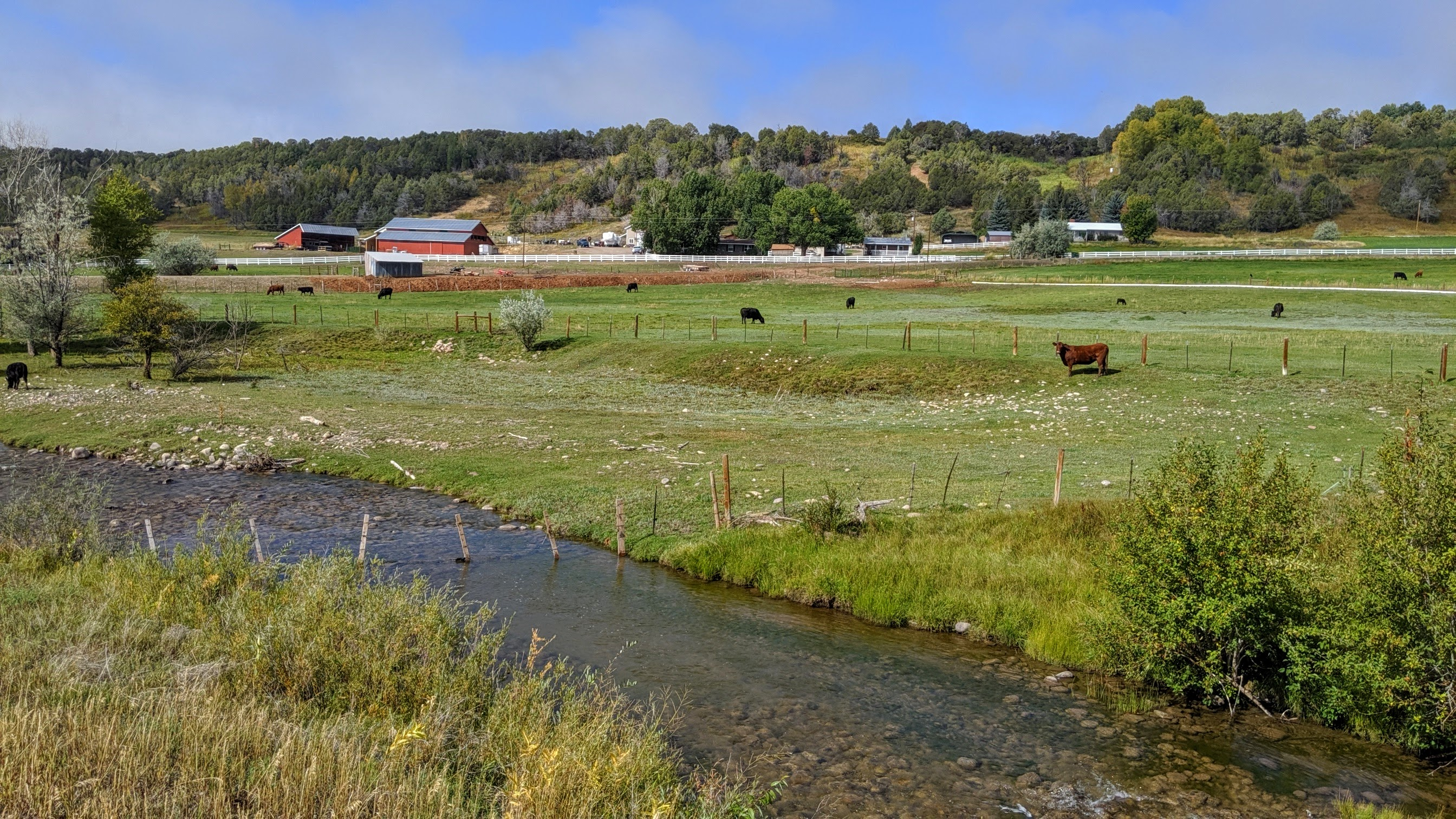
- Near Durango–La Plata County Airport

Physical characteristics
- Source
  - location: Lillie Lake
  - coordinates: 37°34′43″N 107°35′36″W
- Mouth
  - location: Confluence with Animas
  - coordinates: 37°02′56″N 107°52′22″W
  - elevation: 5,994 ft (1,827 m)

Basin features
- Progression: Animas—San Juan—Colorado

Florida River is a 61.7-mile-long (99.3 km) tributary of the Animas River in La Plata County, Colorado.

The river's source is Lillie Lake in the Weminuche Wilderness. After being impounded by the Lemon Dam to form Lemon Reservoir about fifteen miles northeast of Durango, it joins the Animas River south of Durango on the Southern Ute Indian Reservation near the New Mexico state line.

Florida is a name derived from Spanish meaning "little flower".

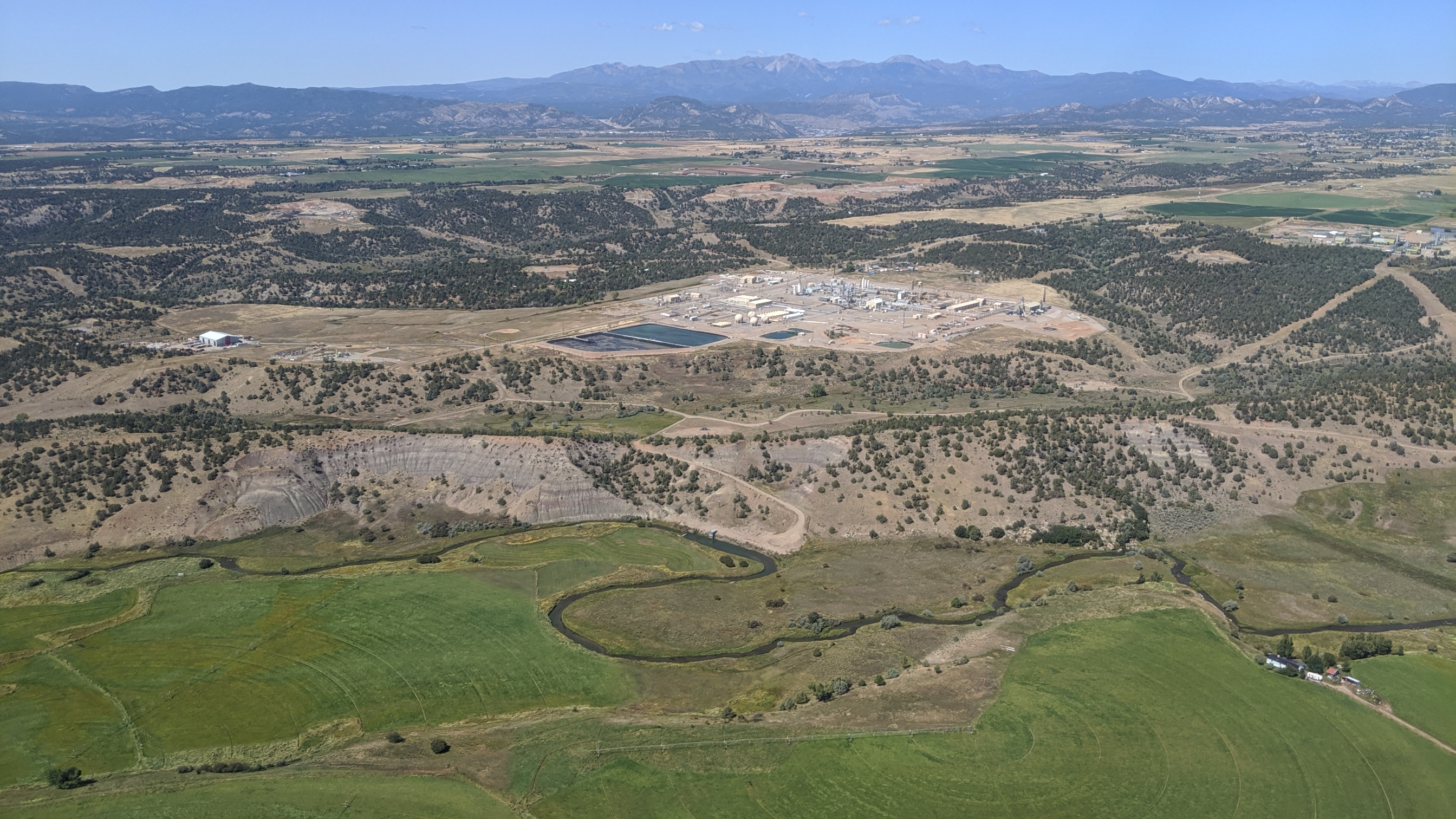
Florida River and Williams–Ignacio Plant (a petroleum and gas processing facility) near Durango, aerial view on takeoff from Durango–La Plata County Airport

== See also ==
- List of rivers of Colorado
