= South Platte River =

River in Colorado and Nebraska, United States

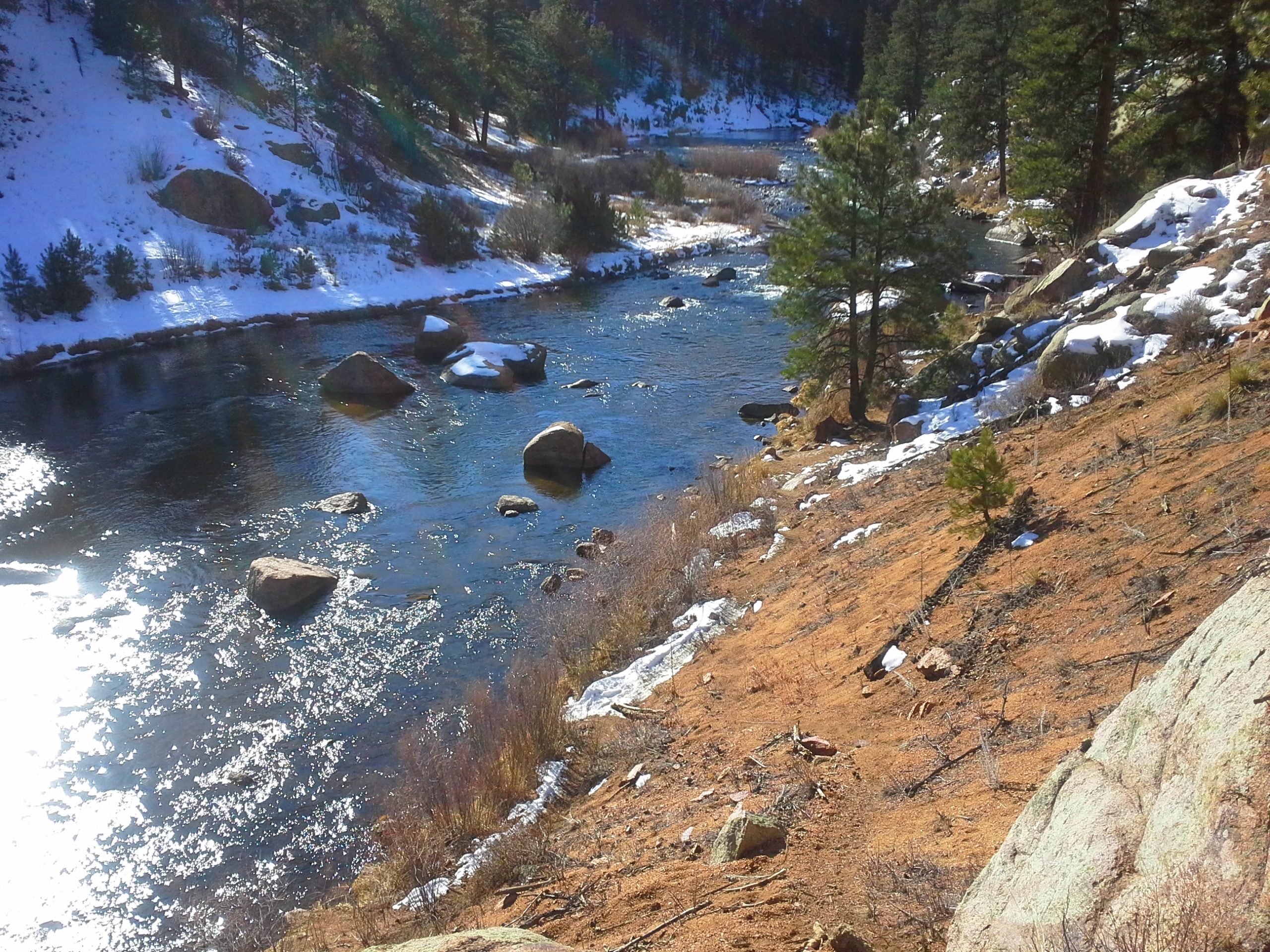
- South Platte River in Douglas County, Colorado

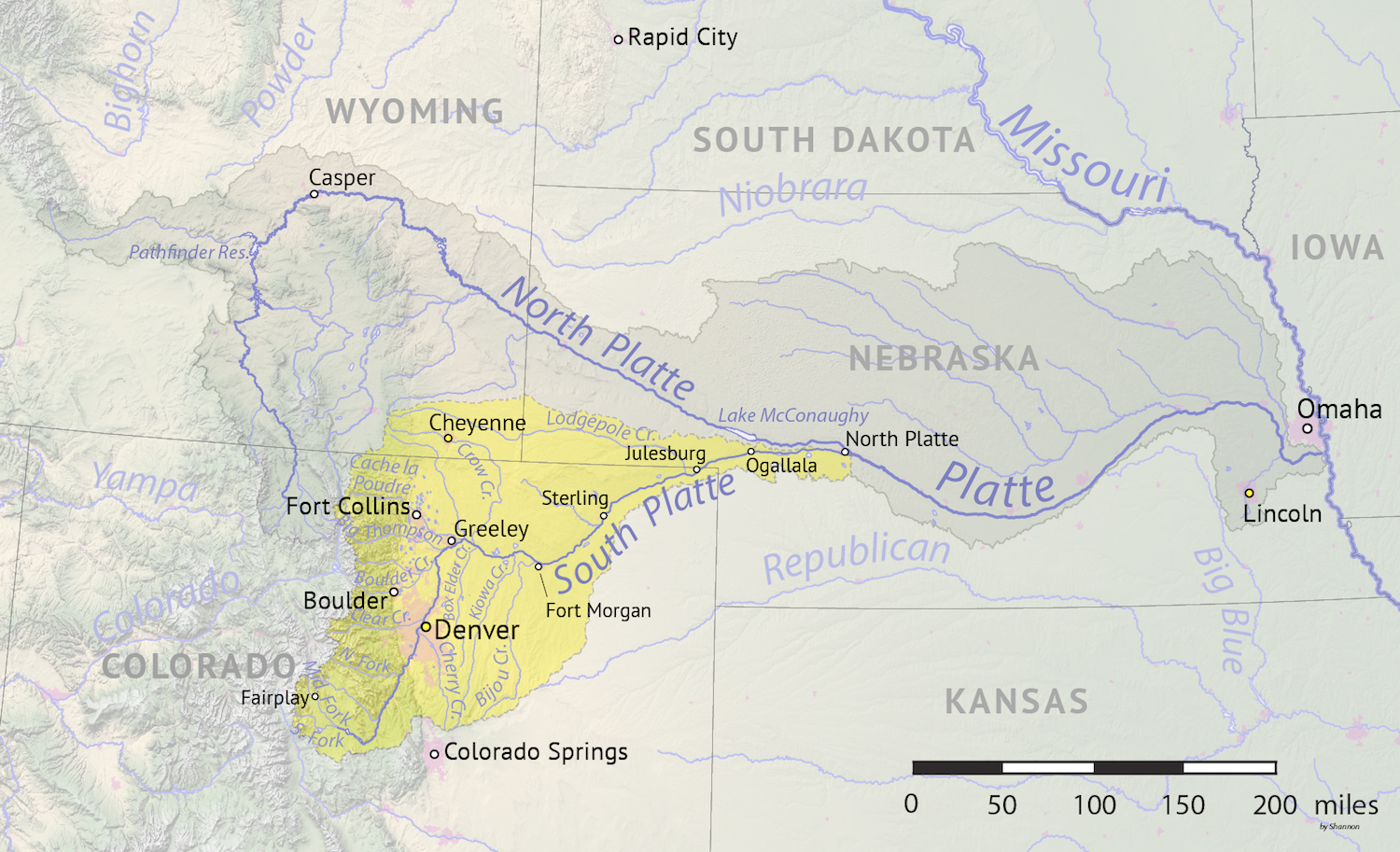
- Native name: Wašíŋ Wakpá (Lakota)

Physical characteristics
- Source
  - location: Confluence of South Fork and Middle Fork
  - coordinates: 39°00′40″N 105°44′25″W
- Mouth
  - location: Confluence with North Platte River
  - coordinates: 41°06′50″N 100°40′33″W
  - elevation: 2,762 ft (842 m)
- Length: 439 mi (707 km)
- Discharge
  - average: 174 cu ft/s (4.9 m^{3}/s)

Basin features
- Progression: Platte—Missouri—Mississippi
- Discharge range: 0 to 4,640 cu ft/s (0 to 131 m^{3}/s)

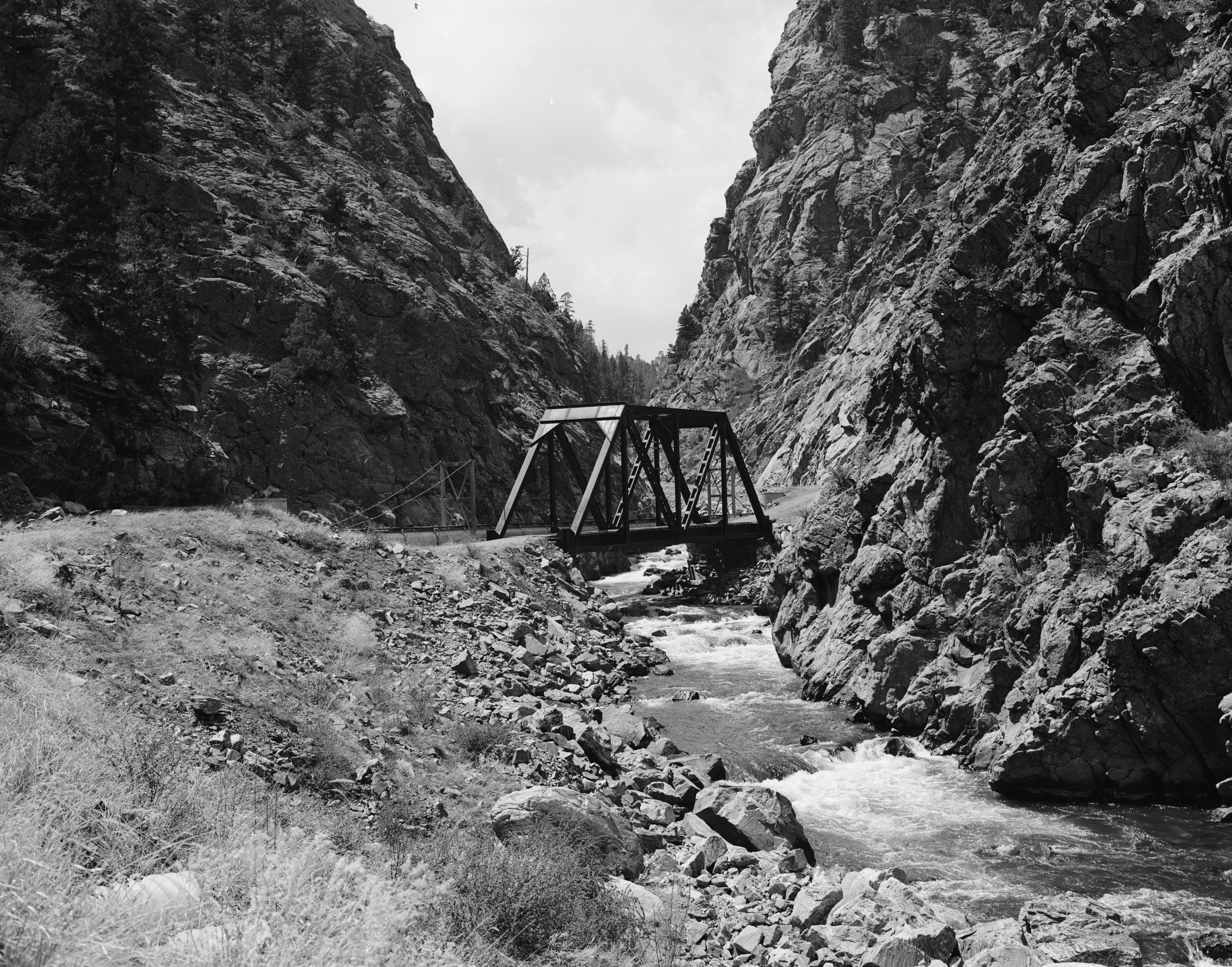
The South Platte River in Platte Canyon, Colorado

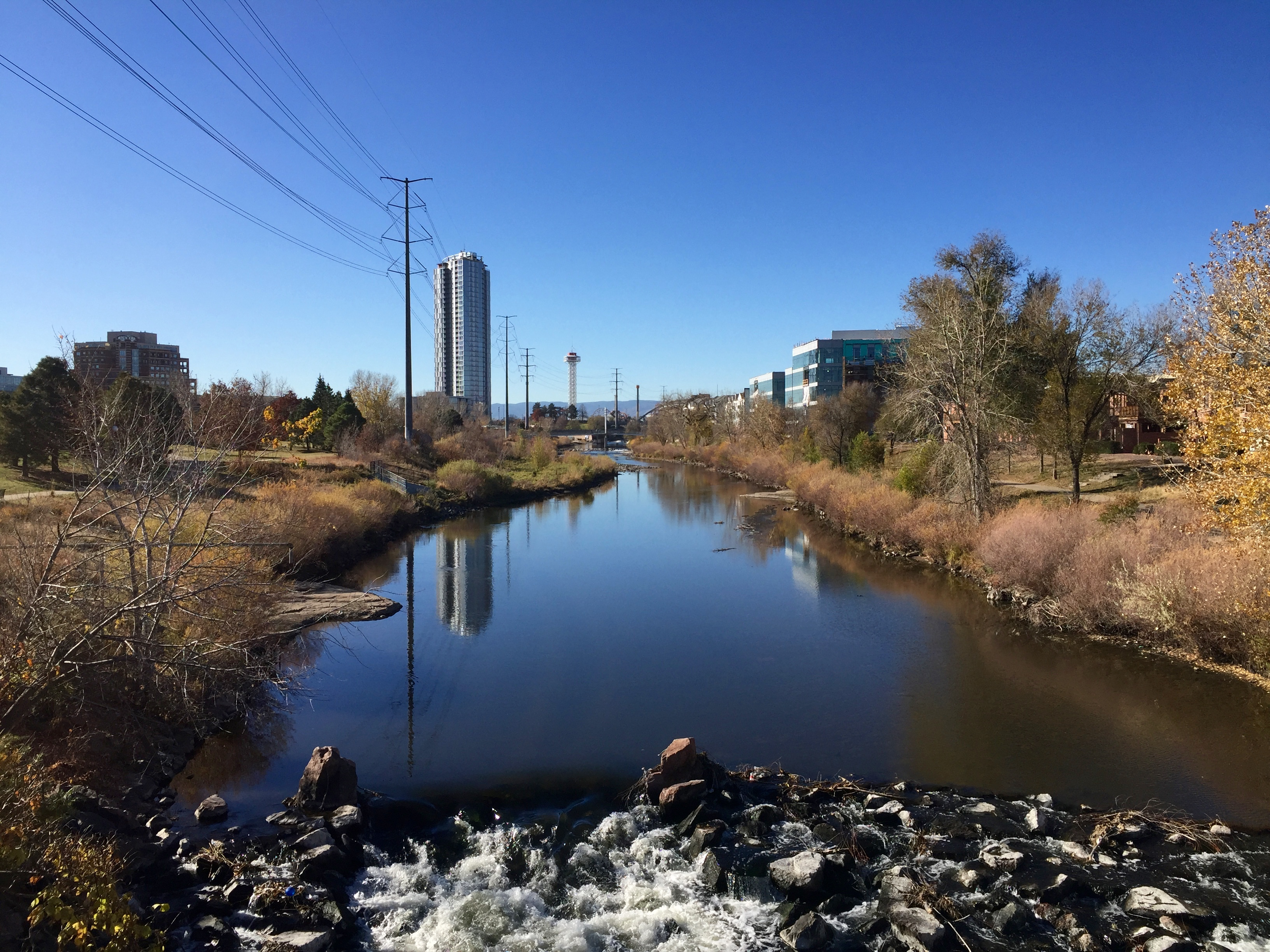
South Platte River in Denver, Colorado

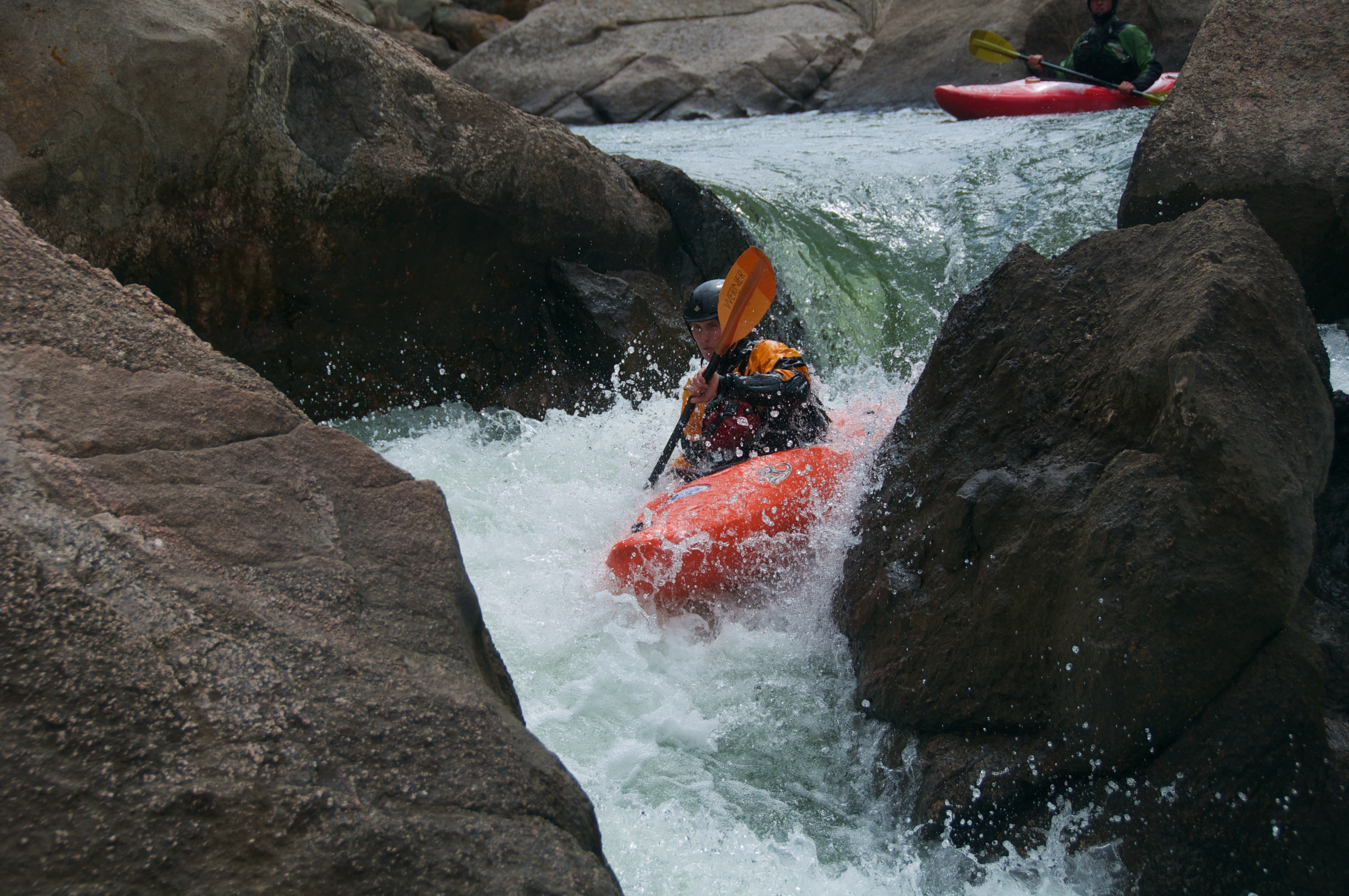
Kayakers in Eleven Mile Canyon

The South Platte River (Sioux: Wašíŋ-Wakpá [waˈʃĩ wakˈpa] lit. “bison tallow river”) is one of the two principal tributaries of the Platte River. Flowing through the U.S. states of Colorado and Nebraska, it is itself a major river of the American Midwest and the American Southwest/Mountain West. Its drainage basin includes much of the eastern flank of the Rocky Mountains in Colorado, much of the populated region known as the Colorado Front Range and Eastern Plains, and a portion of southeastern Wyoming in the vicinity of the city of Cheyenne. It joins the North Platte River in western Nebraska to form the Platte, which then flows across Nebraska to the Missouri. The river serves as the principal source of water for eastern Colorado. In its valley along the foothills in Colorado, it has permitted agriculture in an area of the Colorado Piedmont and Great Plains that is otherwise arid.

== Description ==
The river is formed in Park County, Colorado, southwest of Denver in the South Park grassland basin by the confluence of the South Fork and Middle Fork, about 15 mi (24 km) southeast of Fairplay. Both forks rise along the eastern flank of the Mosquito Range, on the western side of South Park, which is drained by the tributaries at the headwaters of the river. From South Park, it passes through 50 mi (80 km) of the Platte Canyon and its lower section, Waterton Canyon. Here, it is joined by the North Fork before emerging from the foothills southwest of the Denver suburb of Littleton. At Littleton, the river is impounded to form Chatfield Reservoir, a flood-control basin for the Denver metropolitan area.

The river flows north through central Denver, which was founded along its banks at its confluence with Cherry Creek. The valley through Denver is highly industrialized, serving generally as the route for both the railroad lines, as well as Interstate 25. On the north side of Denver, it is joined somewhat inconspicuously by Clear Creek, which descends from the mountains to the west in a canyon that was the cradle of the Pike's Peak Gold Rush. North of Denver, it flows through the agricultural heartland of the Piedmont (a shale region that was formed through erosion by the ancestor of the river following the creation of the Rockies). It flows directly past the communities of Brighton and Fort Lupton, and is joined in succession by Saint Vrain Creek, the Little Thompson River, the Big Thompson River, and the Cache la Poudre River, which it receives just east of Greeley.

East of Greeley, it turns eastward, flowing across the Colorado Eastern Plains, past Fort Morgan and Brush, where it turns northeastward. It continues past Sterling, and runs into Nebraska between Julesburg, Colorado, and Big Springs, Nebraska. In Nebraska, it passes south of Ogallala and joins the North Platte River near the city of North Platte.

The South Platte River through Denver is on the U.S. Environmental Protection Agency's (US EPA) list of impaired waterbodies for pathogen impairment, with E. coli as the representative pathogen species. Other water issues involve the appearance of the New Zealand mud snail and zebra mussel.

The flows of the South Platte have been greatly modified by human activity. Originally the river was seasonal north of Fort Morgan to its confluence with the North Platte. In the 1800s the river would disappear in July, August, and September due to low flows and a sandy river bottom. By 1910 the increase in agriculture caused the river to reach the border of Colorado and Nebraska due to return flows and dams holding back water later in the year. Increasing diversions from the upper Colorado River in the 20th century mean that flows reach the North Platte year round.

== History ==
The South Platte was originally called Niinéniiniicíihéhe by the native Arapaho people who lived on its banks. The early Spanish explorers called it the Rio Chato (calm river). In 1702, it was named the Rio Jesus Maria by Captain Jose Naranjo, the Indigenous-Spanish scout and captain of war of the New Mexico Indian Auxiliaries, who was ordered by the viceroy of New Spain to search the Tierra Incognita for a French incursion into New Mexico. The South Platte also served as a vital water source in Colorado. Long before the city of Denver was created, many travelers came to the South Platte River to escape the arid Great Plains. These people could survive the heat, but not without the vital water source that the South Platte gave them. Buckets and wells sufficed as a water system for a while, but eventually, the Denver Water System was created.

In the late 1830s, four fur trading outposts were established on the river.

== Dams ==
In an arid region of the United States, the South Platte is marked with several dams. The first notable water impoundment on the South Platte is Antero Reservoir. "Antero" is derived from the Spanish word "delantero", which means "foremost" or "head", as the reservoir was the first dam on the South Platte River near the river's origin.

The next dam is Spinney Mountain Reservoir. At capacity, Spinney Mountain covers 2,500 acres (10 km^{2}). A bottom-release dam, Spinney releases to the east of the inlet.

Two miles below Spinney Mountain Reservoir, the river enters Eleven Mile Reservoir, with a capacity of 97,000 acre-feet (120,000,000 m^{3}). The Eleven Mile Reservoir Dam drains into Eleven Mile Canyon, which runs through Forest Service land. Three former Colorado towns, Howbert, Idlewild, and Freshwater Station, were submerged under the reservoir when it was built.

From Eleven Mile Canyon, the South Platte runs northeast to Cheesman Reservoir, named for Denver water pioneer Walter S. Cheesman. At its completion in 1905, the dam was the world's tallest gravity dam, at 221 ft (67 m) above the streambed. The reservoir and related facilities were purchased in November 1918 by the Denver Water Board. Cheesman was the first reservoir of Denver's mountain storage facilities, and has been designated a National Historic Civil Engineering Landmark. Cheesman Reservoir feeds Cheesman Canyon. Six miles below Cheesman Reservoir is the town of Deckers; there, the river bends north for about 17 mi (27 km) to the confluence with the North Fork of the South Platte.

In the late 1980s, a proposal was put forth for the Two Forks Dam, which would have created a reservoir flooding the entire section from the North Fork confluence to the town of Deckers. In 1990, the US EPA vetoed the permit, calling the project an "environmental catastrophe."

From the confluence, the river flows towards Denver and enters Strontia Springs Reservoir.

Below Strontia Springs, the South Platte runs through Waterton Canyon before entering Chatfield Reservoir. Chatfield marks the seventh and final dam on the South Platte until it merges with the North Platte.

== Fly fishing overview ==
The South Platte River is a gold medal western trout river on the eastern slope of Colorado, meaning it produces at least 12 trout of greater than 14 inches in length or greater per acre in areas accessible to the public. The river is well known for its wild trophy population of brown and rainbow trout. As a result of its close proximity to Denver, the river has thousands of fly fishing enthusiasts visit each year. With seven dams on the river, the South Platte is considered a tailwater fishery. Most of these dams are bottom released, which allows for both stable water temperatures and year-round fly fishing. Popular fly-fishing stretches of the river include Waterton Canyon, Cheesman Canyon, and the Dream Stream.

== See also ==
- List of rivers of Colorado
- List of rivers of Nebraska
- South Platte River Trail Scenic and Historic Byway, a 19-mile byway in Sedgwick County, Colorado
- South Platte Trail, the historic trail along the South Platte River, from northwestern Colorado to the Denver area
