= List of lakes of Colorado =

Coordinates: 38.9972°N 105.5478°W

The location of the State of Colorado in the United States of America.

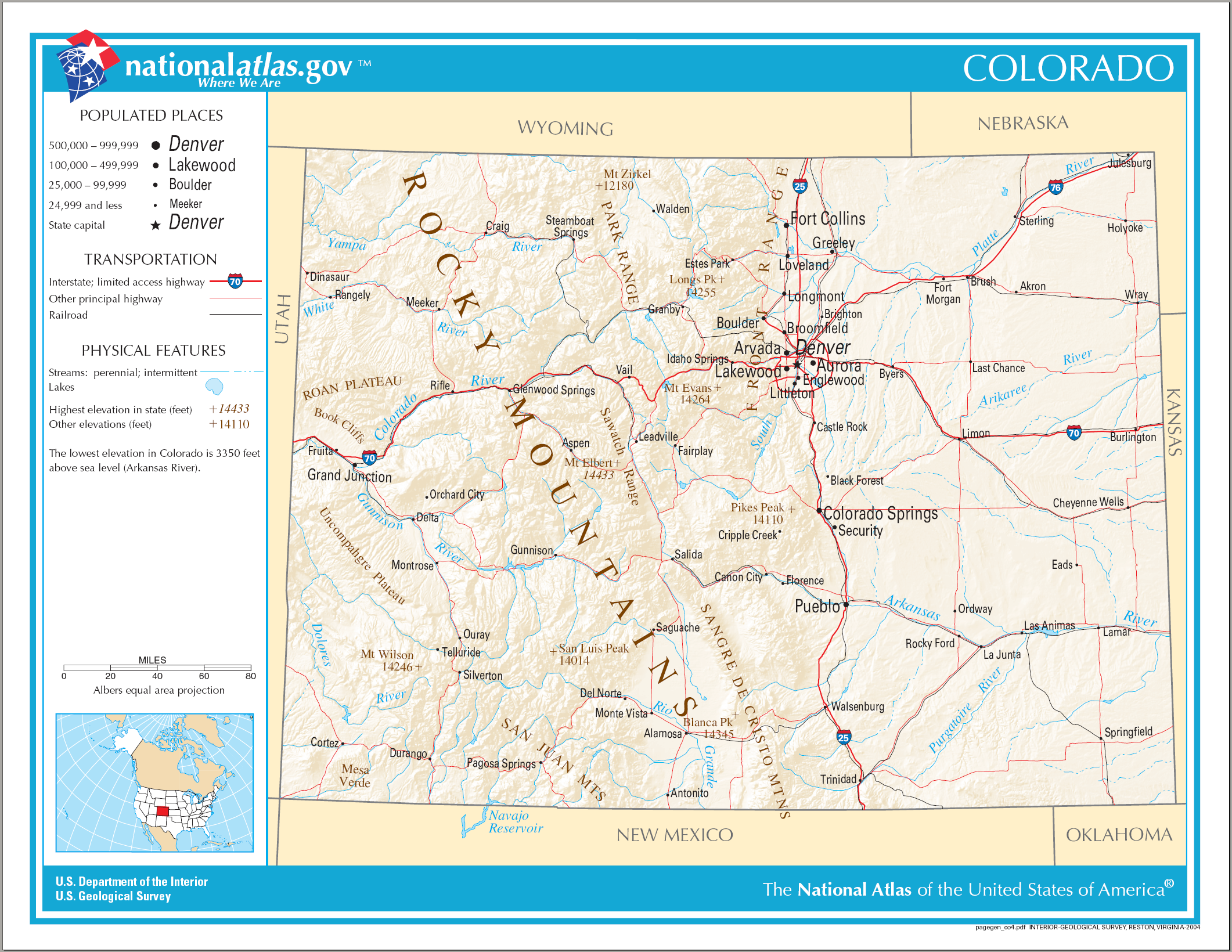
An enlargeable map of the State of Colorado.

This is an alphabetical list of some notable lakes and reservoirs in the U.S. State of Colorado. Most of the larger lakes in Colorado are either reservoirs or dam-enhanced natural lakes.

== A ==
- Acascosa Lake in Conejos County, Colorado
- Adobe Creek Reservoir in Bent and Kiowa counties, Colorado
- Antero Reservoir in Park County, Colorado
- Aurora Reservoir in Aurora, Colorado

== B ==
- Barbour Ponds in Saint Vrain State Park
- Barker Meadow Reservoir in Boulder County, Colorado
- Barr Lake in Barr Lake State Park
- Bear Creek Lake in Lakewood, Colorado
- Bierstadt Lake in Larimer County, Colorado
- Big Soda Lake (Colorado) in Lakewood, Colorado
- Big Meadows Reservoir in Mineral County, Colorado
- Bison Reservoir in Victor, Colorado
- Black Lake at Vail Pass in Eagle County, Colorado
- Blue Mesa Reservoir in Curecanti National Recreation Area – largest reservoir in Colorado
- Bonham Reservoir in Mesa County, Colorado
- Boulder Reservoir in Boulder, Colorado
- Boyd Lake in Boyd Lake State Park

== C ==
- Carter Lake in Larimer County, Colorado
- Chambers Lake in Larimer County, Colorado
- Chatfield Reservoir in Chatfield State Park
- City Park Lake in Denver
- Cherry Creek Reservoir in Cherry Creek State Park
- Clear Creek Reservoir in Chaffee County, Colorado
- Clinton Gulch Dam Reservoir in Summit County, Colorado
- Crater Lake in Pitkin County, Colorado
- Cheesman Reservoir in Douglas and Jefferson counties, Colorado
- Crawford Reservoir in Crawford State Park
- Crystal Creek Reservoir in Teller County, Colorado
- Crystal Reservoir in Curecanti National Recreation Area

== D ==
- Dawson Reservoir in Mesa County, Colorado
- Deep Lake in Garfield County, Colorado
- Deep Ward Lake in Mesa County
- Delaney Butte Reservoir in Jackson County, Colorado
- DeWeese Reservoir in Custer County, Colorado
- Dillon Reservoir in Dillon Reservoir Recreation Area
- Dream Lake in Rocky Mountain National Park

== E ==
- East Portal Reservoir in Larimer County, Colorado
- Echo Lake (Colorado) in Echo Lake Park
- Eleven Mile Reservoir in Eleven Mile State Park
- Elkhead Reservoir in Elkhead State Park
- Emmaline lake in Pingree Park
- Emerald Lake (San Juan National Forest) in Weminuche Wilderness
- Lake Estes in Estes Park, Colorado

== F ==
- Fern Lake in Rocky Mountain National Park
- Flatiron Reservoir in Larimer County, Colorado
- Fruitgrowers Reservoir in Delta County, Colorado

== G ==
- Grand Lake near Rocky Mountain National Park – largest natural lake in Colorado
- Grass Valley Reservoir in Harvey Gap State Park in Garfield County
- The Great Plains Reservoirs in Kiowa County, Colorado
- Green Mountain Reservoir in Green Mountain Reservoir Recreation Area
- Grizzly Reservoir in Pitkin County, Colorado
- Gross Reservoir in Boulder County, Colorado

== H ==
- Hanging Lake in Glenwood Canyon
- Harker Park Lake in Rio Blanco County, Colorado
- Harvey Gap Reservoir in Harvey Gap State Park
- Haynach Lakes in Rocky Mountain National Park
- Homestake Reservoir in Eagle and Pitkin counties
- Horsetooth Reservoir in Larimer County, Colorado

== J ==
- Jackson Gulch Reservoir in Montezuma County, Colorado
- Jefferson Lake in Park County, Colorado
- Jackson Lake in Jackson Lake State Park, Morgan County, Colorado
- John Martin Reservoir in John Martin Reservoir State Park – largest reservoir in eastern Colorado

== K ==
- Kenney Reservoir, in Rio Blanco County, Colorado

== L ==
- La Jara Reservoir in Conejos County, Colorado
- Lake Avery in Rio Blanco County, Colorado
- Lake Dillon, see Dillon Reservoir
- Lake Estes in Estes Park, Colorado
- Lake George in Park County, Colorado
- Lake Granby in Arapaho National Recreation Area
- Lake Isabel in Lake Isabel Recreation Area
- Lake John in Jackson County, Colorado
- Lake Loveland in Loveland, Colorado
- Lake Meredith in Crowley County, Colorado
- Lake Pueblo in Lake Pueblo State Park
- Lake Maloya in Colfax County, New Mexico and Las Animas County, Colorado
- Lake Rhoda in Lakeside, Colorado
- Lake San Cristobal in Hinsdale County, Colorado – second largest natural lake in Colorado
- Lily Lake in Rocky Mountain National Park
- Lemon Reservoir in La Plata County, Colorado
- Lizard Lake in Gunnison County, Colorado
- Lost Man Reservoir in Pitkin County, Colorado

== M ==
- Maroon Lake in Pitkin County, Colorado
- Marston Lake in Denver
- Marys Lake in Larimer County, Colorado
- McPhee Reservoir in McPhee Recreation Area – second largest reservoir in Colorado
- Meadow Creek Reservoir in Arapaho National Recreation Area
- Miramonte Reservoir in San Miguel County, Colorado
- Monarch Lake in Arapaho National Recreation Area
- Montgomery Reservoir in Park County, Colorado
- Morrow Point Reservoir in Curecanti National Recreation Area
- Mount Elbert Forebay in Lake County, Colorado
- Mountain Home Reservoir in Costilla County, Colorado
- Murphy Lake in Rocky Mountain National Park

== N ==
- Navajo Reservoir at Navajo State Park
- North Michigan Creek Reservoir in State Forest State Park

== O ==
- O'Haver Lake at San Isabel National Forest

== P ==
- Pacific Tarn in Summit County, Colorado – highest named lake in the United States
- Paonia Reservoir in Paonia State Park
- Pearl Lake in Pearl Lake State Park
- Pinewood Lake in Larimer County, Colorado
- Platoro Reservoir in Conejos County, Colorado
- Poudre Lake in Rocky Mountain National Park
- Pueblo Reservoir, see Lake Pueblo

== Q ==
- Quincy Reservoir in Aurora, Colorado

== R ==
- Ralph White Lake in Moffat County, Colorado
- Ralston Reservoir in Jefferson County, Colorado
- Rampart Reservoir in El Paso County, Colorado
- Ridgway Reservoir in Ridgway State Park
- Rifle Gap Reservoir in Rifle Gap State Park
- Ruedi Reservoir in the John Ruedi Recreation Area of White River National Forest
- Rueter–Hess Reservoir in Douglas County, Colorado
- Runyon Lake in Pueblo, Colorado

== S ==
- San Luis Lake in San Luis State Park, Alamosa County, Colorado
- Sanchez Reservoir in Costilla County, Colorado
- Seaman Reservoir near Fort Collins
- Shadow Mountain Lake in Arapaho National Recreation Area, Grand County, Colorado
- Silver Jack Reservoir in Gunnison County, Colorado
- Sloan's Lake in Denver, Colorado
- Smith Lake in Washington Park, Denver, Colorado
- Smith Reservoir in Costilla County, Colorado
- Snowdrift Lake in Rocky Mountain National Park, Grand County, Colorado
- Snowmass Lake, in Pitkin County
- Stagecoach Reservoir in Stagecoach State Park, Routt County, Colorado
- Standley Lake in Westminster, Colorado
- Stapp Lakes in Ward, Colorado
- Steamboat Lake in Steamboat Lake State Park, Routt County, Colorado
- Strontia Springs Reservoir in Douglas County and Jefferson County, Colorado
- Sweitzer Lake in Sweitzer Lake State Park, Delta County, Colorado
- Summit Lake in Summit Lake Park, Clear Creek County, Colorado
- Summit Reservoir in Montezuma County, Colorado
- Sylvan Lake in Sylvan Lake State Park, Eagle County, Colorado

== T ==
- Tarryall Reservoir in Park County, Colorado
- Taylor Park Reservoir in Gunnison County, Colorado
- Terrace Reservoir in Conejos County, Colorado
- Trappers Lake in the Flat Tops Wilderness Area of White River National Forest
- Trinidad Lake in Trinidad Lake State Park
- Trujillo Meadows Reservoir in Conejos County, Colorado
- Turquoise Lake in the Turquoise Lake Recreation Area of San Isabel National Forest
- Twin Lakes in Twin Lakes Recreation Area of San Isabel National Forest

== V ==
- Vallecito Reservoir in La Plata County, Colorado
- Vega Reservoir in Vega State Park

== W ==
- Williams Creek Reservoir in San Juan National Forest, Hinsdale County, Colorado
- Williams Fork Reservoir in Grand County, Colorado
- Willow Creek Reservoir in Arapaho National Recreation Area, Grand County, Colorado
- Windy Gap Reservoir in Grand County, Colorado
- Wolford Mountain Reservoir, Grand County, Colorado

== See also ==
- List of dams and reservoirs in Colorado
- List of Colorado state parks
- Bibliography of Colorado
- Geography of Colorado
- History of Colorado
- Index of Colorado-related articles
- List of Colorado-related lists
- Outline of Colorado
