= Willow Creek =

Willow Creek may refer to:

== Places ==
- Willow Creek Border Crossing, at Canada–US border

=== Canada ===
- Municipal District of Willow Creek No. 26, Alberta
- Willow Creek Provincial Park, Alberta
- Rural Municipality of Willow Creek No. 458, Saskatchewan

=== United States ===
- Willow Creek, Alaska
- Willow Creek, California
- Willow Creek, Indiana
- Willow Creek, Minnesota
- Willow Creek, Montana
- Willow Creek AVA, a California wine region
- Willow Creek-Lurline Wildlife Management Area, northern California
- Willow Creek Pass (Colorado)
- Willow Creek Wildlife Area, Oregon
- Willow Creek Winery, a winery in New Jersey

== Hydrology ==
- Willow Creek (Colorado), a tributary of the Colorado River
- Willow Creek (Calaveras County, California), which flows into New Hogan Lake
- Willow Creek (Lassen County, California), a tributary of the Susan River
- Willow Creek (Madera County, California), a primary inflow to Bass Lake in Madera County
- Willow Creek (New York), a tributary of Cayuga Lake in Tompkins County
- Willow Creek (Sacramento County, California), a tributary of the American River
- Willow Creek (Manitoba), a tributary of the Assiniboine River
- Willow Creek (Montana), a list of streams named Willow Creek in Montana
- Willow Creek (Long Pine Creek tributary), a stream in Brown County, Nebraska
- Willow Creek (Niobrara River tributary), a stream in Rock County, Nebraska
- Willow Creek (Goose Lake), Oregon, primary inflow to Goose Lake on the Oregon-California border
- Willow Creek (Columbia River tributary), Oregon
- Willow Creek (Deschutes River tributary), Oregon
- Willow Creek (Grand and Uintah counties, Utah)
- Willow Creek (Jordan River tributary), Utah
- Willow Creek (Price River tributary), Utah, a tributary of the Price River
- Willow Creek (Susitna River tributary), left tributary of Susitna River in Alaska
- Willow Creek Dam (Oregon)
- Willow Creek Dam (Colorado)
- Willow Creek Dam (Montana)

== Other ==
- Willow Creek (film), a 2013 film
- Willow Creek Association, a Christian organization; Seventh-day Adventist Interfaith Relations § Willow Creek
- Willow Creek Community Church, in South Barrington, Illinois
- Willow Creek/Southwest 185th Avenue Transit Center, a light rail station in Oregon, United States
- Willow Creek, a fictional neighborhood in the life simulation video game The Sims 4
