= Mendicant Ridge =

Mountain in the state of Colorado

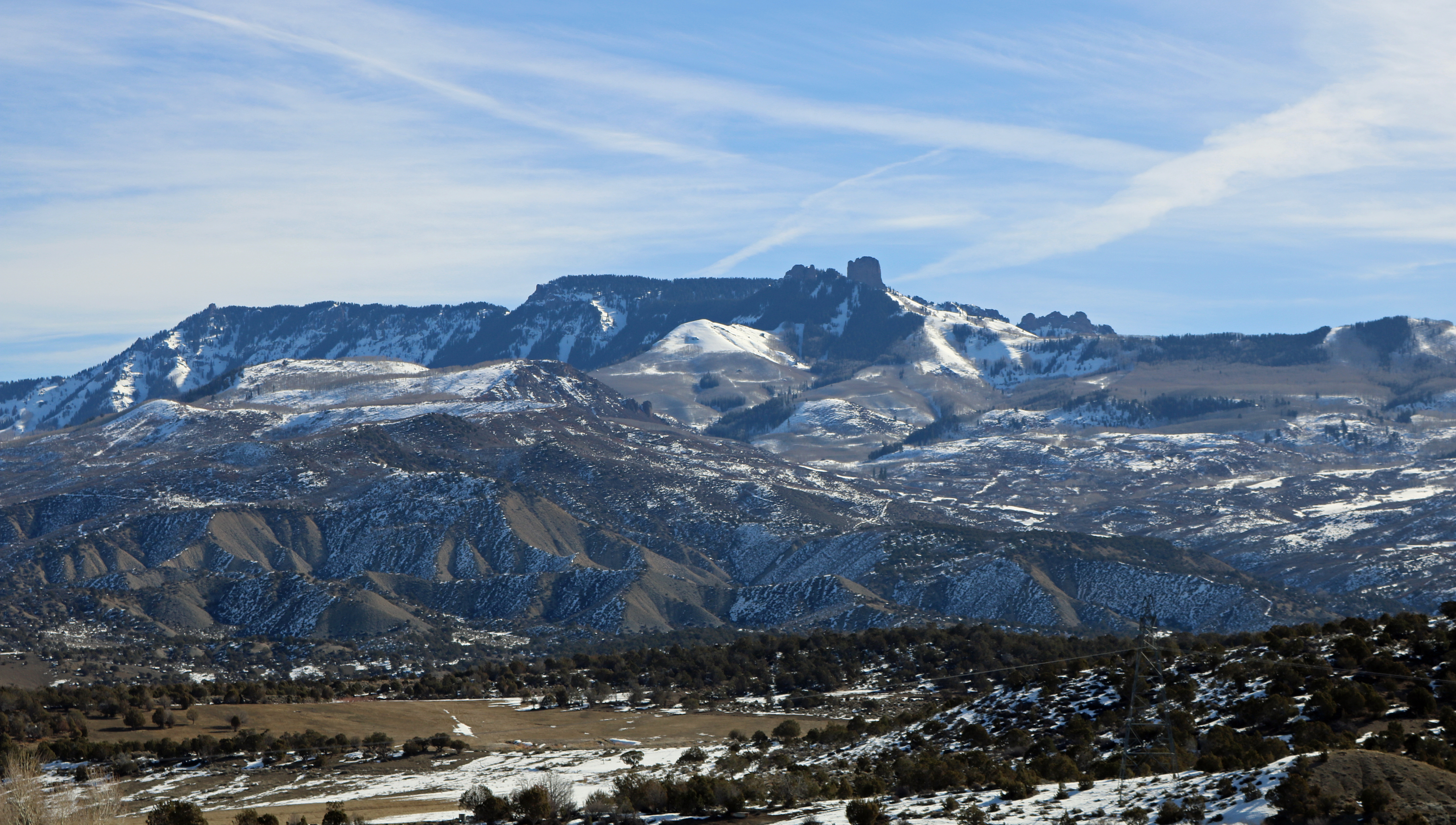
- Mendicant Ridge as seen from Colorado State Highway 92 near Maher.

Highest point
- Elevation: 11,841 ft (3,609 m)
- Prominence: 1,541 ft (470 m)
- Parent peak: Mount Guero
- Coordinates: 38°40′12″N 107°25′33″W

Geography
- Location within Colorado
- Location: Gunnison National Forest, Gunnison County, Colorado, U.S.
- Parent range: West Elk Mountains
- Topo map: USGS 7.5' topographic map

Climbing
- Easiest route: Hike from Bald Mountain Reservoir.

Mendicant Ridge is a massive 12 miles (19 km) long high mountain located about 9 miles (14 km) east-southeast of Crawford, Colorado, in the Gunnison National Forest, Gunnison County, Colorado, United States. The ridge marks the western edge of the West Elk Mountains range of the Rocky Mountains of North America and dominates the eastern skyline of the adjacent valley with about 5,000 ft (1,500 m) of vertical relief above Crawford State Park. Trending roughly northeast, Mendicant Ridge has four distinct summits that are often confused in the reference literature. From Castle Rock summit at 11,205 ft (3,415 m) on the southwest, the ridge rises to Mendicant Ridge South summit at 11,425 ft (3,482 m), then to a higher central summit at 11,603 ft (3,537 m), and finally to the Mendicant Ridge High Point located on the northeast end at an elevation of 11,841 ft (3,609 m).

== See also ==
- List of Colorado mountain ranges
- List of Colorado mountain summits
- List of Colorado county high points
