= Willow Creek Dam =

Willow Creek Dam can refer to:

- Willow Creek Dam (Colorado)
- Willow Creek Dam (Montana)
- Willow Creek Dam (Nebraska)
- Willow Creek Dam (Oregon)
