= Willow Creek Pass =

Willow Creek Pass may refer to:

- Willow Creek Pass (Colorado)
- Willow Creek Pass (Montana)
- Willow Creek Summit, a mountain pass in Idaho

== See also ==
- Willow Creek (disambiguation)
- List of mountain passes
