= Gravity dam =

Type of dam using its weight to hold back water

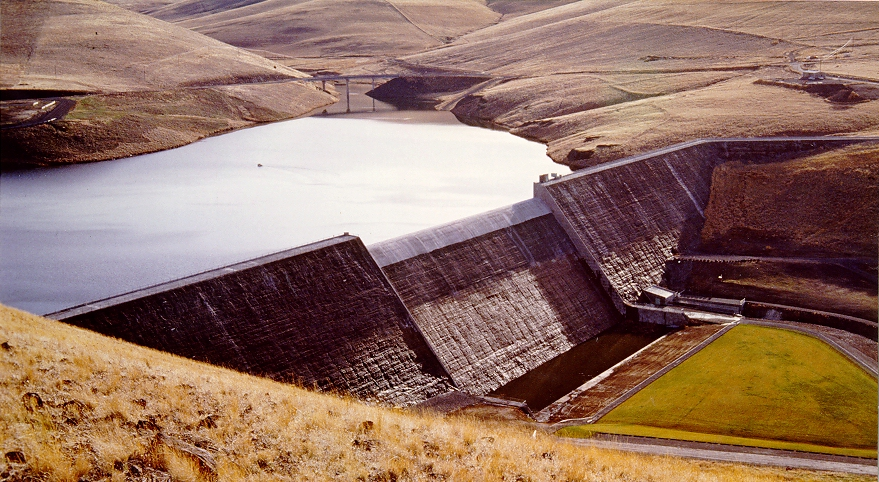
Willow Creek Dam in Oregon, a roller-compacted concrete gravity dam

A gravity dam is a dam constructed from concrete or stone masonry and designed to hold back water by using only the weight of the material and its resistance against the foundation. Gravity dams are designed so that each section of the dam is stable and independent of any other dam section.

In contrast, sections of an arch dam are not independently stable, instead relying on transmitting force through neighboring sections to the abutments, often anchored into canyon walls.

== History ==
Gravity dams are among the earliest water storage structures built by humans. Around 2950–2750 BC, Egyptians built a 14-meter-high stone gravity dam on the Nile known in Arabic as Sadd el-Kafara, which means “Dam of the Pagans”. It is a straight wall made of stone or earth that resists water pressure. The water force is transferred as vertical and horizontal forces to the foundation. A gravity dam’s strength depends on its weight and the strength of its foundation.

== Characteristics ==
Gravity dams generally require stiff rock foundations of high bearing strength (slightly weathered to fresh), although in rare cases they have been built on soil.

Stability of the dam primarily arises from the range of normal force angles viably generated by the foundation. The stiff nature of a gravity dam structure means it endures differential foundation settlement poorly, as this can crack the dam structure.

The main advantage of gravity dams over embankments is the scour-resistance of concrete, which protects against damage from minor over-topping flows. Unexpected large over-topping flows are still a problem, as they can scour dam foundations. A disadvantage of gravity dams is that their large concrete structures are susceptible to destabilising uplift pressures relative to the surrounding soil. Uplift pressures can be reduced by internal and foundation drainage systems.

During construction, the exothermic curing of concrete can generate large amounts of heat. The poorly-conductive concrete then traps this heat in the dam structure for decades, expanding the plastic concrete and leaving it susceptible to cracking while cooling. It is the designer's task to ensure this does not occur.

== Design ==
Gravity dams are built by first cutting away a large part of the land in one section of a river, allowing water to fill the space and be stored. Once the land has been cut away, the soil has to be tested to make sure it can support the weight of the dam and the water. It is important to make sure the soil will not erode over time, which would allow the water to cut a way around or under the dam. Sometimes the soil is sufficient to achieve these goals; however, other times it requires conditioning by adding support rocks, which will bolster the weight of the dam and water. Three different tests can be done to determine the foundation's support strength: the Westergaard, Eulerian, and Lagrangian approaches. Once the foundation is suitable to build on, construction of the dam can begin. Usually, gravity dams are built out of a strong material such as concrete or stone blocks and built into a triangular shape to provide the most support.

== Classifications ==
The most common classification of gravity dams is by the materials composing the structure:

- Concrete dams include
  - Mass concrete dams, made of:
    - Conventional concrete: Dworshak Dam, Grand Coulee Dam
    - Roller-compacted concrete (RCC): Willow Creek Dam (Oregon), Upper Stillwater Dam
  - Masonry: Aswan Low Dam, Pathfinder Dam, Cheesman Dam
  - Hollow gravity dams, made of reinforced concrete: Braddock Dam

Gravity dams can be classified by plan (shape):

- Most gravity dams are straight (Grand Coulee Dam).
- Some masonry and concrete gravity dams have the dam axis curved (Shasta Dam, Cheesman Dam) to add stability through arch action.

Gravity dams can be classified with respect to their structural height:

- Low, up to 100 feet.
- Medium high, between 100 and 300 feet.
- High, over 300 feet.

== Earthquakes ==
Gravity dams are built to withstand some of the strongest earthquakes. Even though the foundation of a gravity dam is built to support the weight of the dam and all the water, it is quite flexible in that it absorbs a large amount of energy and sends it into the Earth's crust. It needs to be able to absorb the energy from an earthquake because if the dam were to break it would send a large amount of water rushing downstream and destroy everything in its way. Earthquakes are the biggest danger to gravity dams and that is why, every year and after every major earthquake, they must be tested for cracks, durability, and strength. Although gravity dams are expected to last anywhere from 50 to 150 years, they need to be maintained and regularly replaced.

== Bibliography ==
- Kollgaardand, E.B.; Chadwick, W.L. (1988). Development of Dam Engineering in the United States. US Committee of the International Commission on Large Dams.
- Dams of the United States - Pictorial display of Landmark Dams. Denver, Colorado: US Society on Dams. 2013.
