= Heppner flood of 1903 =

Flood in Oregon, United States

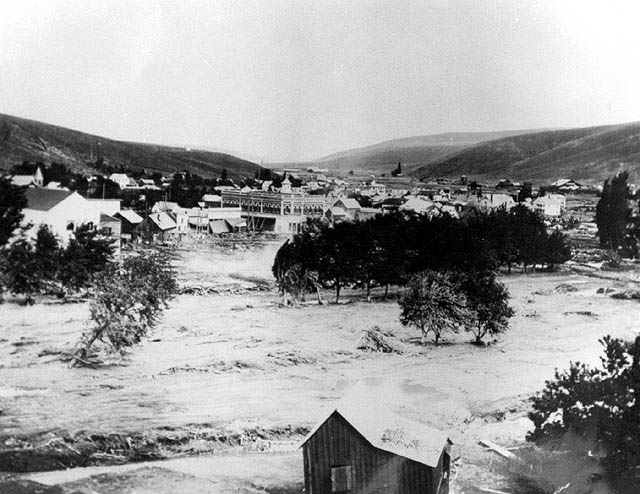
Downtown Heppner during the flood

The Heppner flood of 1903 was a major flash flood along Willow Creek responsible for destroying a large portion of Heppner, Oregon, United States, on June 14, 1903. With a death toll of 247 people, it remains the deadliest natural disaster in Oregon, and the second deadliest flash flood in the United States, behind the 1889 Johnstown Flood and ahead of the 1972 Black Hills Flood. The flood caused over $600,000 in damage, equivalent to $21 million today.

== Thunderstorms and torrential rain ==
After an exceptionally dry spring, strong thunderstorms moved over the Heppner area on June 14, 1903. Torrential rain and hail began falling on the watersheds of Willow Creek and two of its largest tributaries, Balm Fork and Hinton Creek, by 16:30.

The region's arid climate and little vegetation coupled with the ground already being wet from a storm three days earlier caused very little water to be absorbed by the soil, and soon the streams were flooding. Within fifteen minutes after the rain began to fall, water rushed down the streams (mainly the Balm Fork), towards Heppner.

A steam laundry building on the southern edge of Heppner built across Willow Creek acted as a dam when the water arrived, failing under the stress several minutes later. This sent a 15-to-50-foot (5 to 15 m) wall of water cascading down Willow Creek that quickly reduced many of Heppner's structures to rubble. Some structures were ripped off their foundations and floated downstream. At its peak, over 36,000 cubic feet per second (1,000 m^{3}/s) of water raced down Willow Creek, more than the average flow of the much larger Willamette River to the west.

Many people were able to escape to higher ground, but 247—nearly a quarter of Heppner's population at the time—died. The waters finally receded around an hour later. Numerous houses in Heppner were destroyed, and around 140 total structures, about one-third of Heppner, were washed away. Heppner's population did not completely recover to pre-1903 levels for several decades.

== Floods in Lexington and Ione and outbreak of typhoid fever ==
After the flood inundated Heppner, two of its residents, Les Matlock and Bruce Kelly, rode on horseback to warn the cities of Lexington and Ione, 9 and 18 miles (14 and 29 km) downstream, respectively. The flood washed through Lexington at about 19:00, just before they arrived, destroying several buildings. Matlock and Kelly continued north to Ione, overtaking the flood and warning the bewildered residents to evacuate. No one was killed in Ione or Lexington. However, the floodwaters washed raw sewage from Heppner downstream, contaminating wells in both Lexington and Ione. As a result, at least 18 people died from typhoid fever over the next several months.

== Flood control studies and creation of the Willow Creek Dam ==
The flood led to flood control studies in 1962, 1965, and 1979. The Willow Creek Dam was completed in 1983 to prevent such a flood in the future. It is the first major roller-compacted concrete dam.

== Recording in photographs by Walter S. Bowman ==
Pendleton, Oregon photographer Walter S. Bowman captured images of the aftermath.
