= Stapp Lakes =

Lake in Ward, Colorado

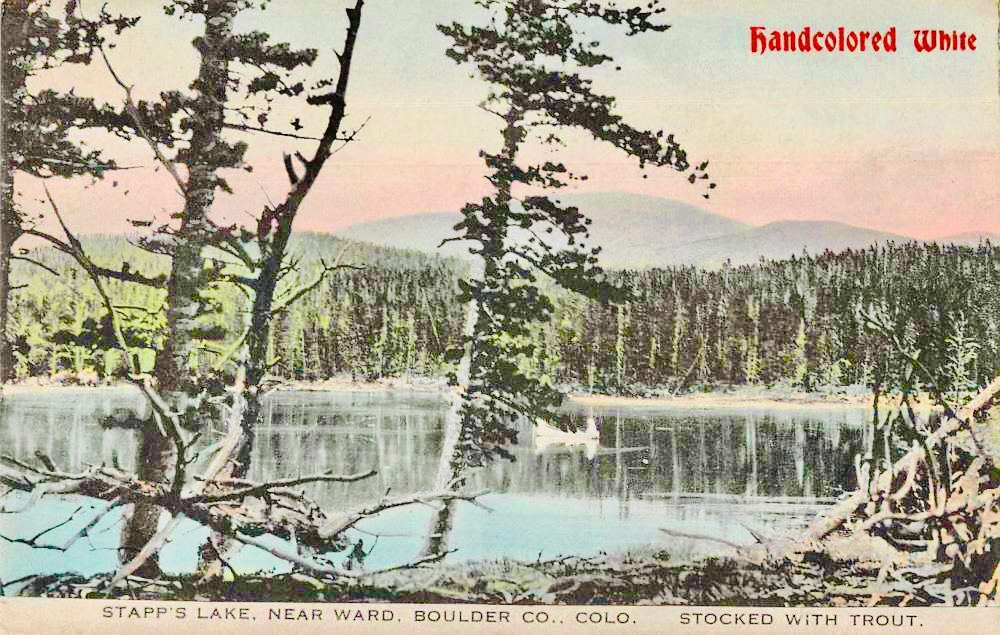
- Stapp's Lake

- Location of Boulder County, Colorado, US Stapp Lakes (the United States)
- Location: 3305 County Road 96 Ward, Colorado
- Coordinates: 40°7′4.21″N 105°32′42.96″W
- Type: Lake
- Basin countries: United States
- Surface area: 320 acres (130 ha)
- Surface elevation: 9,390 feet (2,860 m)

Stapp Lakes, also known as Stapp's Lake is a body of water near the town of Ward, Boulder County, Colorado, at the base of Mount Audubon. The lakes were the central feature of the Stapp Lakes Lodge, one of the original dude ranches in Colorado. Today, the Stapp Lakes are on private property with no public access.

== History ==
Stapp Lakes is an area of natural beauty and historical significance. Situated amidst picturesque mountainous surroundings, Stapp Lakes offers a serene and scenic environment. The lakes themselves are a highlight, providing opportunities for recreational activities such as fishing, boating, and wildlife observation. The lakes are named after Isaac S. Stapp, who discovered the region in 1893. After the railroad reached Ward, Colorado in 1898, guests had easier access to the resort. Stapp went on to file a homestead claim on 160 acres (65 ha) and establish the Stapp Lakes Ranch. He was granted a homestead patent to his entry at Stapp's lake in March 1899.

In April 1899, Stapp undertook the task of introducing 50,000 trout from a Wyoming hatchery into Stapp Lake. Additionally, he constructed a charming mountain retreat that featured a spacious dining room capable of accommodating up to 70 individuals simultaneously. Accessible via the Northwestern road, the resort was located eight miles away and could be conveniently reached by stagecoach. The ranch held historical significance as it originally became Colorado's inaugural dude ranch and even hosted notable figures like Teddy Roosevelt and Georgia O'Keeffe were amongst its guests said to have stayed there.

In 1910, in a Colorado Supreme Court case Fuller v. Stapp, was filed that plaintiffs purchased from defendants, Isaac S. Stapp and Mattie Stapp, the Stapp Lakes property. At that time the lakes were stocked with three varieties of trout. The judgement found that no fraud had been committed by the defendants.

Nature enthusiasts and outdoor adventurers were once drawn to Stapp Lakes for its hiking trails, camping spots, and opportunities to see the beauty of the surrounding wilderness. There is diverse flora and fauna in the region. Beaver Creek Trail passes through the Beaver Creek to the so-called Stapp Lakes Trail. The Stapp Lakes Trail comes onto a four-wheel-drive road connecting Coney Flats with Beaver Reservoir.

In 1935, The Rocky Mountain Round Table had one of their regional conferences of social workers at the Stapp Lakes.

David R. Sellers bought the property in 1996. He sold the 328-acre estate for $22.5 million (equivalent to $32,202,293 in 2025) in 2011. The ownership of the property subsequently transferred once again, and a decision was made to remove the hillside that concealed the underground house. The Stapp Lakes are on private property with no public access.

== Gallery ==
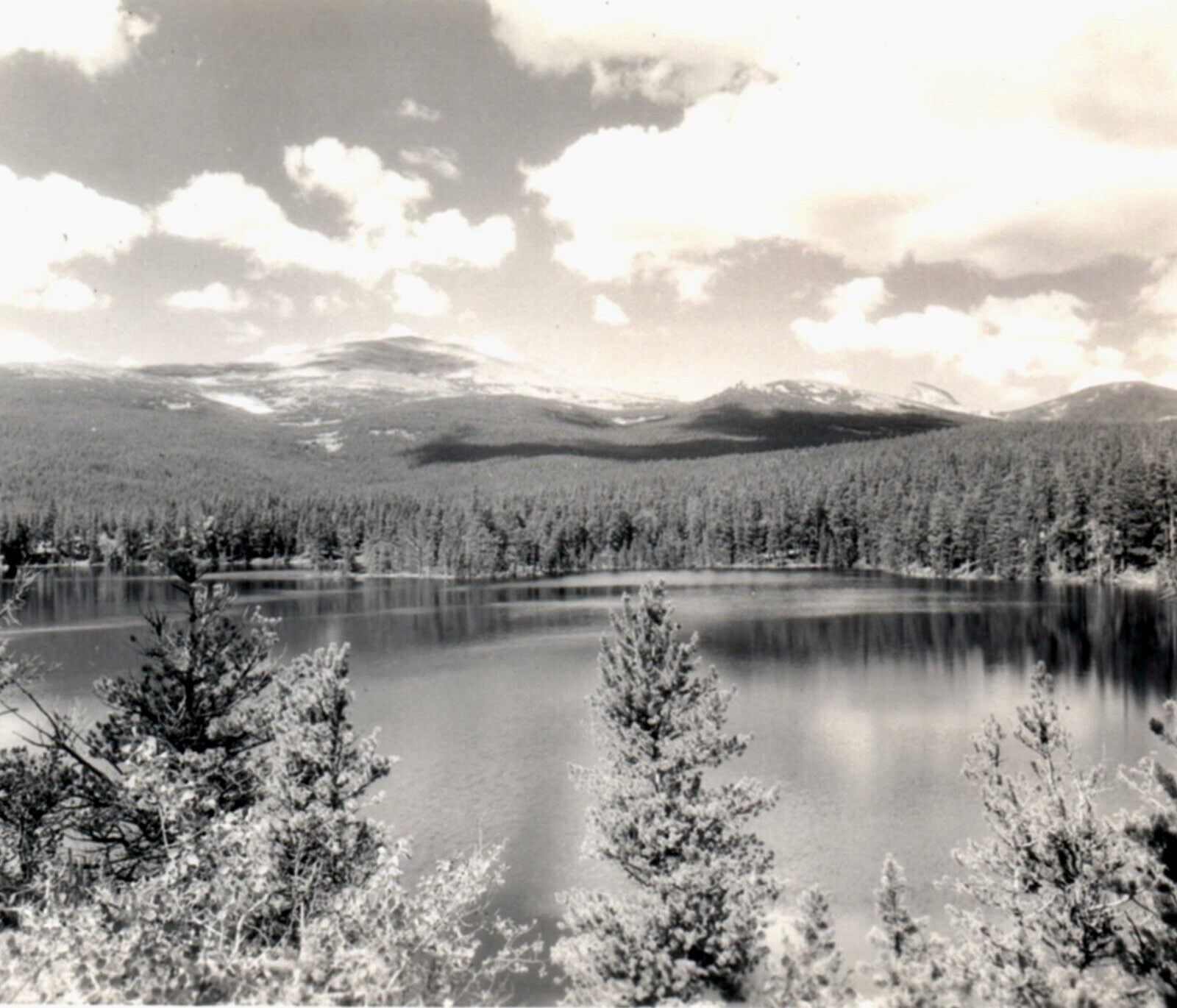
Stapp's Lakes, Ward, Colorado

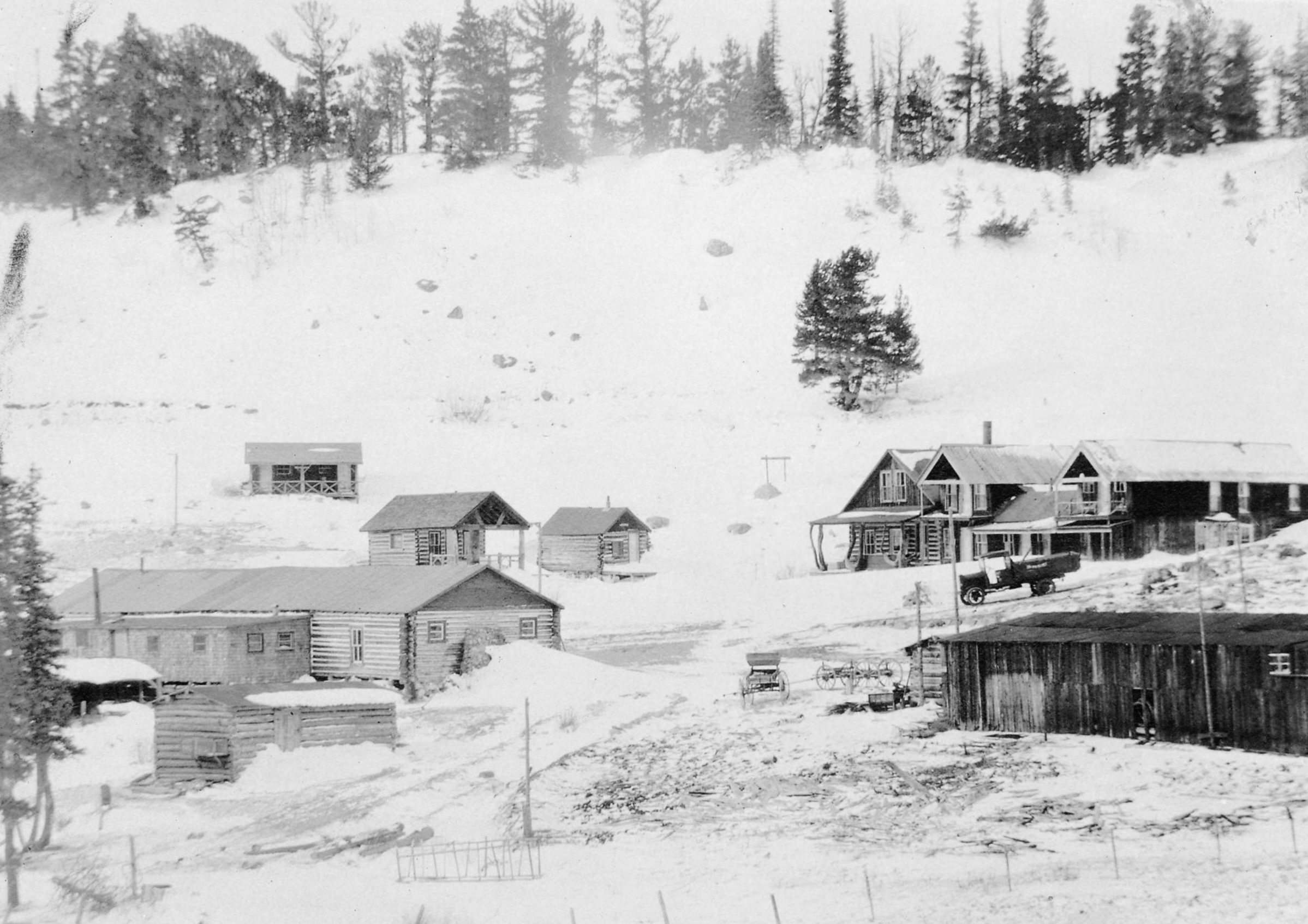
View of Stapp Lakes Lodge with snow on the ground. Log cabins, two small four-wheeled wagons and a truck visible beneath a ridge

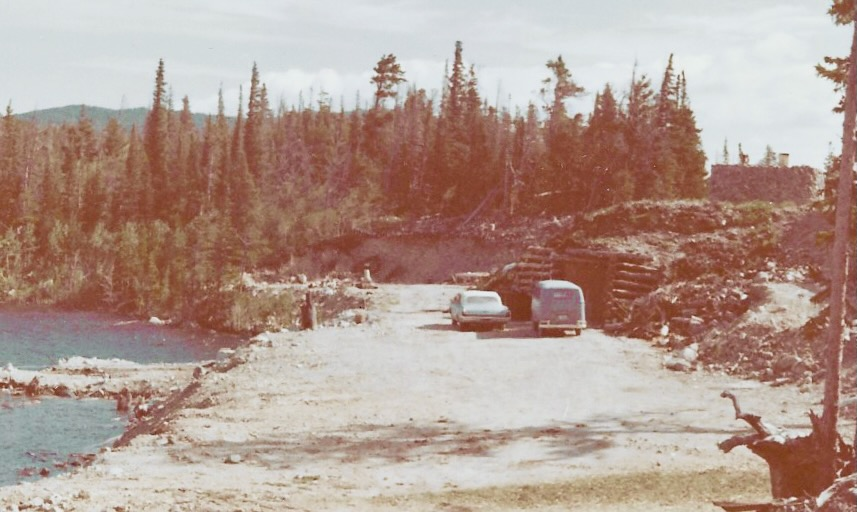
Stapp's Lake next to the Underground House

== See also ==
- List of lakes of Colorado
