= Arapaho National Recreation Area =

Protected area in Colorado

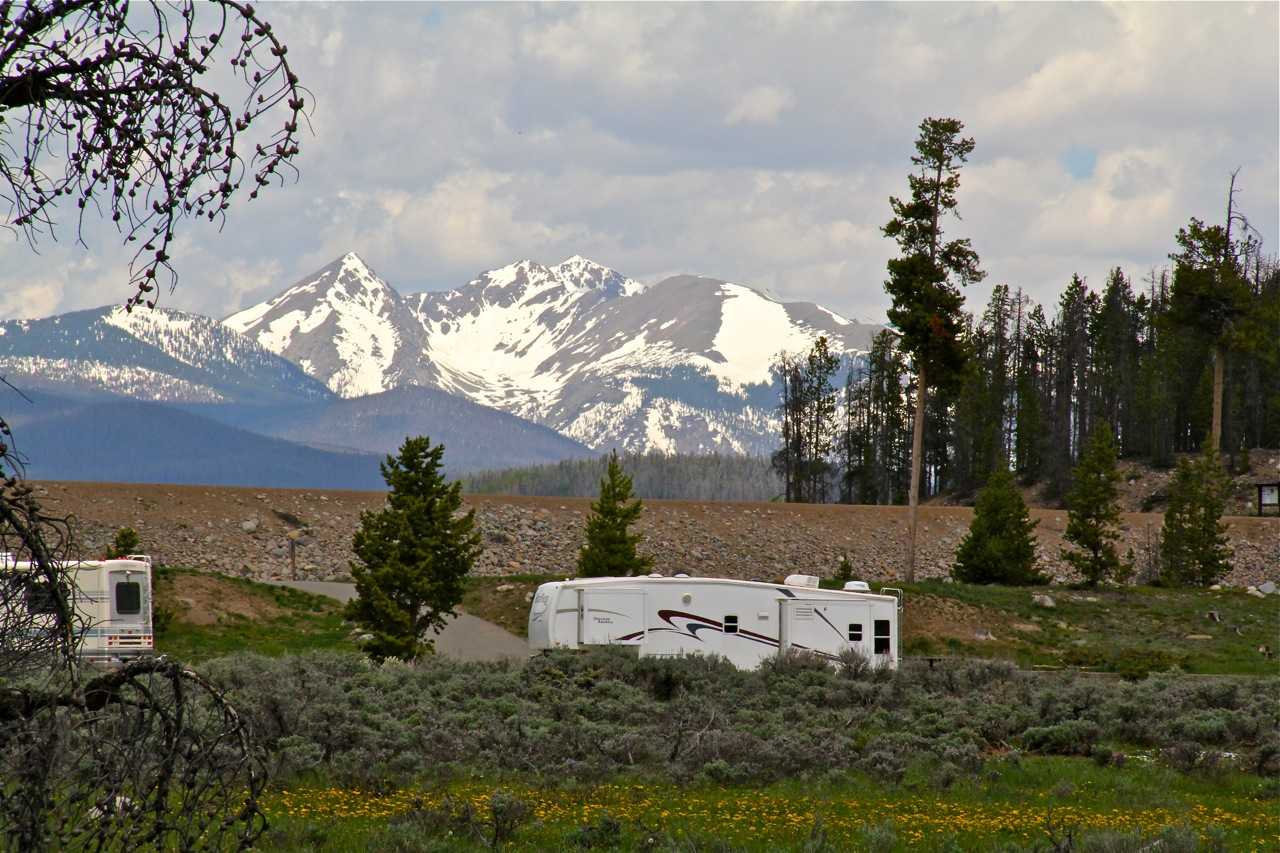
- Green Ridge Campground in Arapaho NRA

- Location within the United States
- Location: Grand County, Colorado, United States
- Nearest city: Granby, Colorado
- Coordinates: 40.144°N 105.814°W
- Area: 30,690 acres (12,420 ha)
- Established: 1978
- Governing body: United States Forest Service
- Website: Arapaho National Recreation Area

The Arapaho National Recreation Area (ANRA) is a United States national recreation area located near the headwaters of the Colorado River in north central Colorado adjacent to Rocky Mountain National Park. ANRA is under the jurisdiction of the Arapaho-Roosevelt National Forest. ANRA contains five lakes in the upper Colorado River Valley:

- Lake Granby
- Shadow Mountain Lake
- Willow Creek Reservoir
- Monarch Lake
- Meadow Creek Reservoir

A sixth lake, Grand Lake, borders the recreation area on the north. Grand Lake is the largest natural lake in Colorado. Collectively, these six lakes are known as "The Great Lakes of Colorado."

The Continental Divide National Scenic Trail passes through the recreation area.
