= Emerald Lake (San Juan National Forest) =

Alpine lake in Colorado

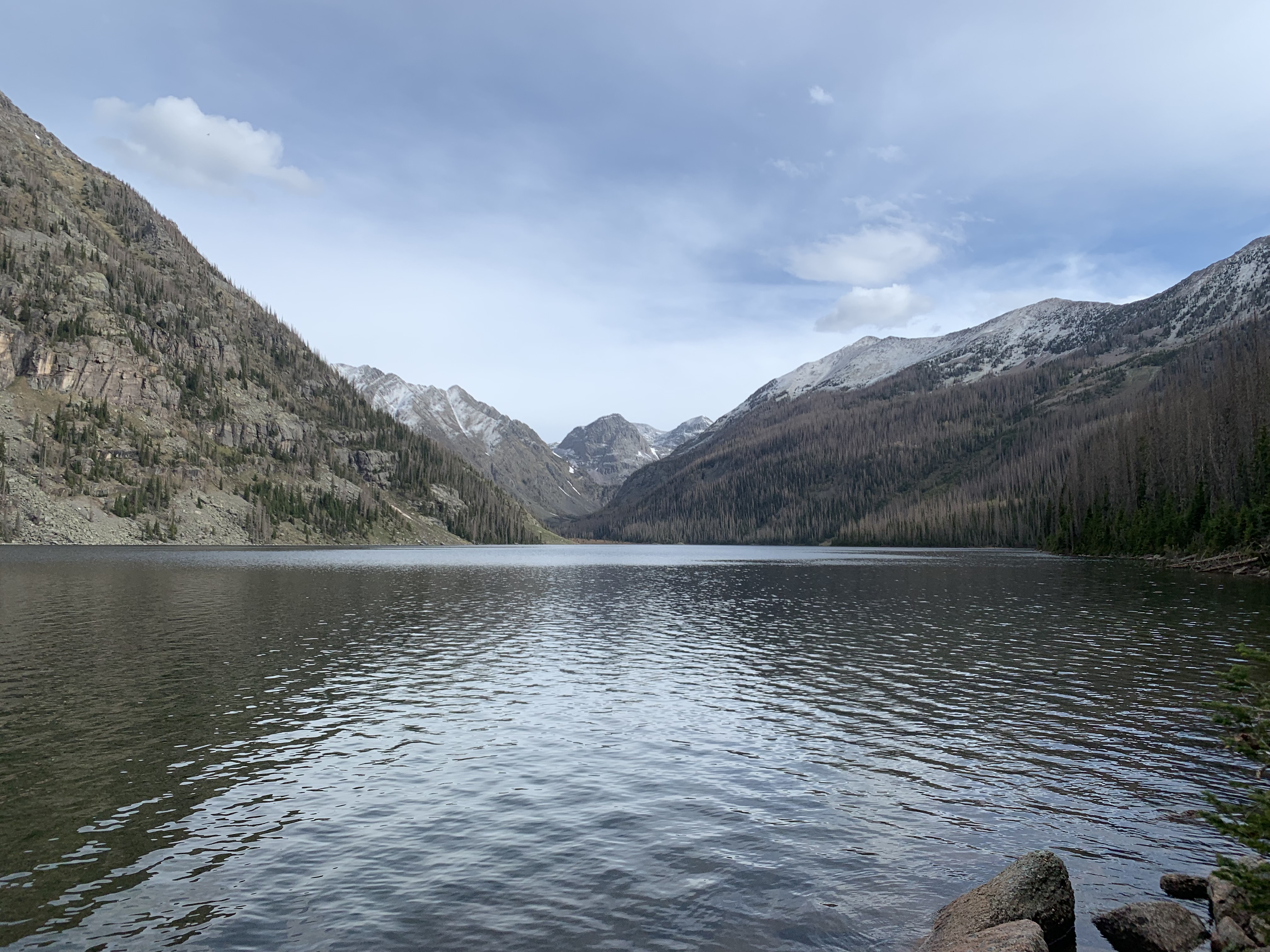
- Emerald Lake from its southern edge, May 2022

- Location: Weminuche Wilderness, Hinsdale County, Colorado, US
- Coordinates: 37°33′10.43″N 107°26′42.77″W
- Surface elevation: 10,054 ft (3,060 m)

Emerald Lake is an alpine lake in Hinsdale County, Colorado, located in the Weminuche Wilderness of the San Juan National Forest near the Continental Divide. The Lake can be accessed by the Lake Fork trail #528. The lake is stocked with salmon.

== See also ==
- Weminuche Wilderness
- List of lakes of Colorado
