= Seaman Reservoir =

Reservoir in Colorado, United States

Coordinates: 40°42′18.94″N 105°14′13.92″W

Seaman Reservoir is located 15 miles (24 km) northwest of Fort Collins, Colorado up the Poudre Canyon. It is also called the Gateway Natural Area. Depending on the water level, cliffs around the reservoir can range from 6–70 feet (1.8–21.3 m).

The Seaman Reservoir Trail is 1.0 mile long in one direction and has almost zero elevation gain.
