= Willow Creek (Calaveras County, California) =

Stream in Calaveras County, California, U.S.

Coordinates: 38.1621°N 120.6485°W

Willow Creek is a stream in Calaveras County, California. It was the site of an arson fire in 2016.
