= Lizard Lake (Gunnison County) =

Lake in Gunnison County, Colorado, United States

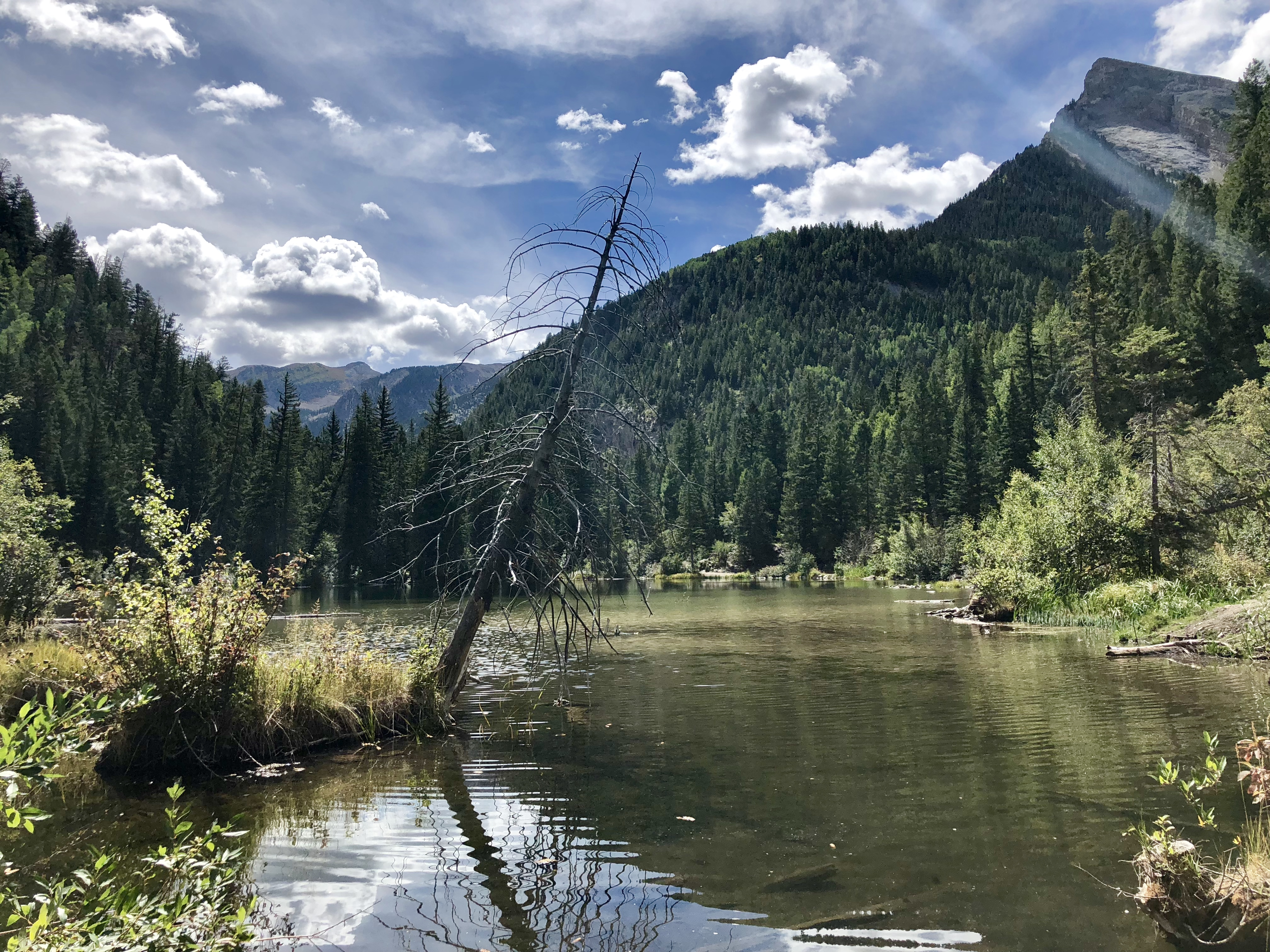
- Midday at Lizard Lake in late summer.

- Location within Colorado Location within the United States
- Location: Gunnison County, Colorado
- Coordinates: 39°4′16.032″N 107°9′17.568″W
- Basin countries: United States
- Surface area: 0.008 sq mi (0.021 km^{2})
- Max. depth: Unknown
- Surface elevation: 8,705 ft (2,653 m)

Lizard Lake is a lake in Gunnison County, Colorado. The lake is located within the boundaries of the White River National Forest, between Marble and the ghost town of Crystal, along Crystal City Road (FSR #314). The lake has views of Whitehouse Mountain (to the southeast), and is near Sheep Mountain (to the northeast) and Hat Mountain (to the southwest). The name Lizard Lake is a misnomer for the salamanders (not lizards) with feather-like gills inhabiting the lake, seen along the mud lake bottom and floating above the aquatic vegetation.

== Access ==
Lizard Lake is located on public land, however physical access to Lizard Lake is limited due to terrain and road conditions. A high clearance vehicle or other means of transportation is required to reach the lake (e.g. foot, horse, mountain bike, off-road vehicle). Pets are allowed on the trail connecting to Lizard Lake.

== Prohibited activities ==
The use of motor boats is prohibited on the lake, as indicated by a sign on the shoreline which reads:

LIZARD LAKE
MOTOR BOATS PROHIBITED
VIOLATORS SUBJECT TO PROSECUTION
UNDER SECRETARY OF AGRICULTURE'S
REGULATIONS (36 CFR, 251.25)
