= Willow Creek (Sacramento County, California) =

River in Folsom, California

Coordinates: 38.6499°N 121.1913°W

Willow Creek in Folsom, California flows into Lake Natoma. The Humbug Willow Creek trail offers walking and cycling along the creek.

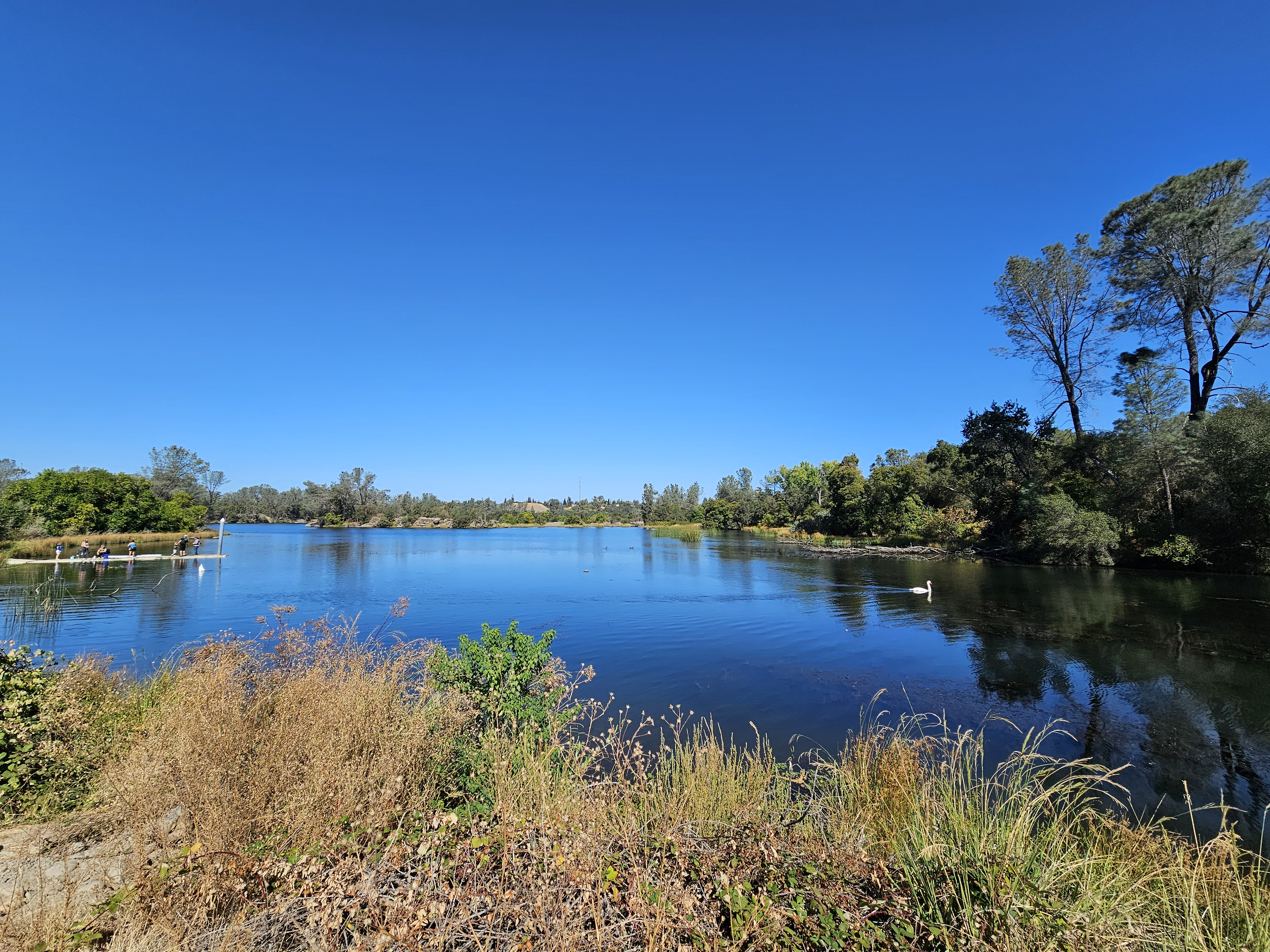
Willow Creek in Folsom, California
