= Paonia Dam =

Dam in Gunnison County, Colorado, US

Coordinates: 38°56′32″N 107°21′07″W

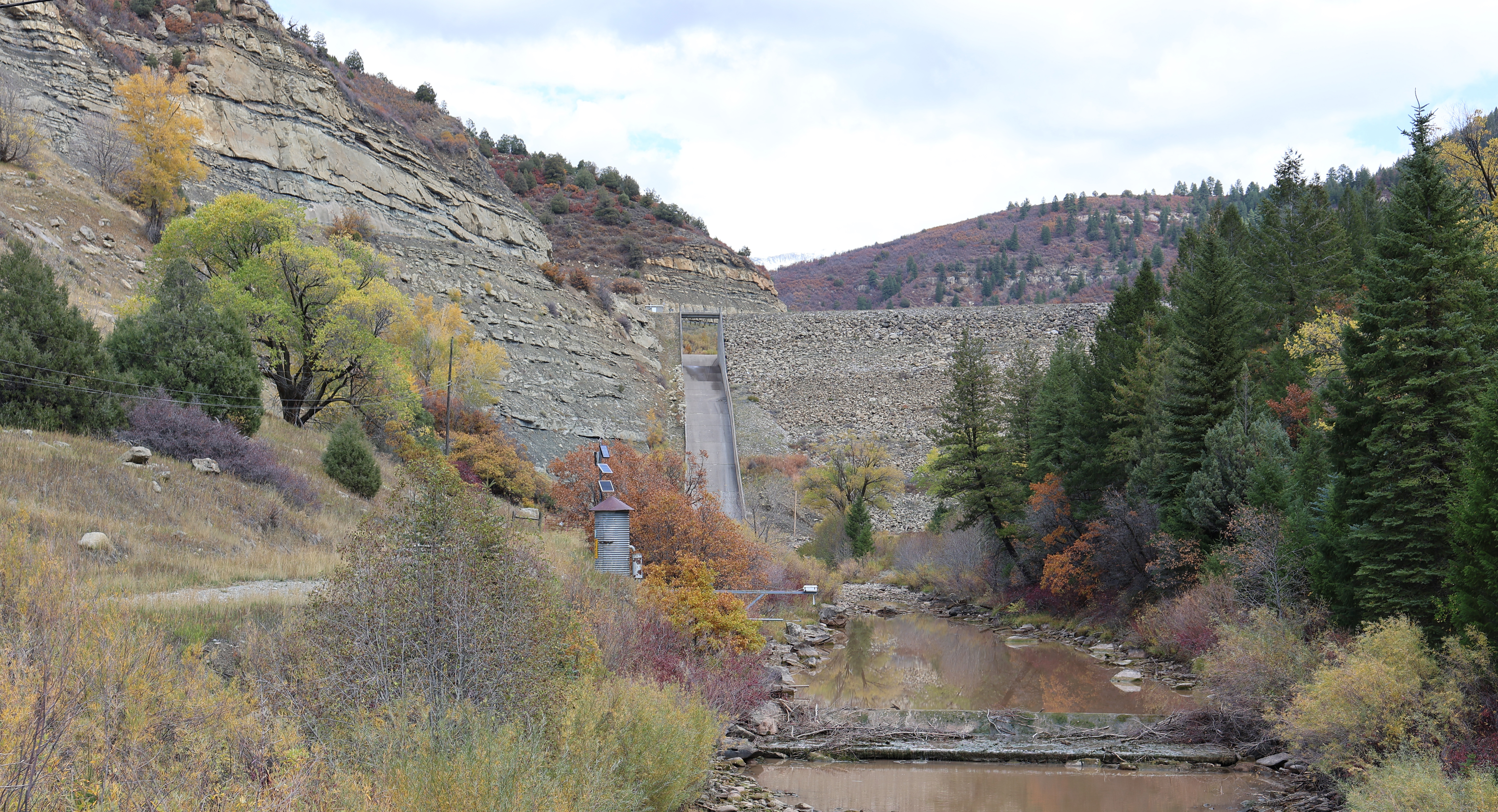
Paonia Dam (2025)

Paonia Dam is a dam in Gunnison County, Colorado.

The earthen dam was a project of the United States Bureau of Reclamation. Built between 1959 and 1962 for irrigation storage, it stands 199 feet (61 m) high and 770 feet (230 m) across at its crest. Paonia Dam impounds Muddy Creek. The dam's NID ID is CO01691. It stores water for the Fire Mountain Canal, a ditch that delivers water to farmers in the North Fork Valley of Delta County, Colorado.

The lake it creates, Paonia Reservoir, has a surface area of 334 acres (135 ha) with a total capacity of 20,950 acre-feet (25,840,000 m^{3}) and a normal capacity of 18,150 acre-feet (22,390,000 m^{3}) and a normal elevation of 6,457 feet (1,968 m). The recreational facilities of Paonia State Park include campsites, picnic sites and a boat ramp. Geologic formations from the Cretaceous and Paleocene periods are visible in the park, along with fossilized palm fronds and leaf imprints. Park uplands are gambel oak shrublands along with mixed conifer and aspen forests. Commonly seen wildlife includes, mule deer, elk, cottontail rabbit and marmot.
