= Lake Avery =

Reservoir in Colorado, United States

- Big Beaver Reservoir
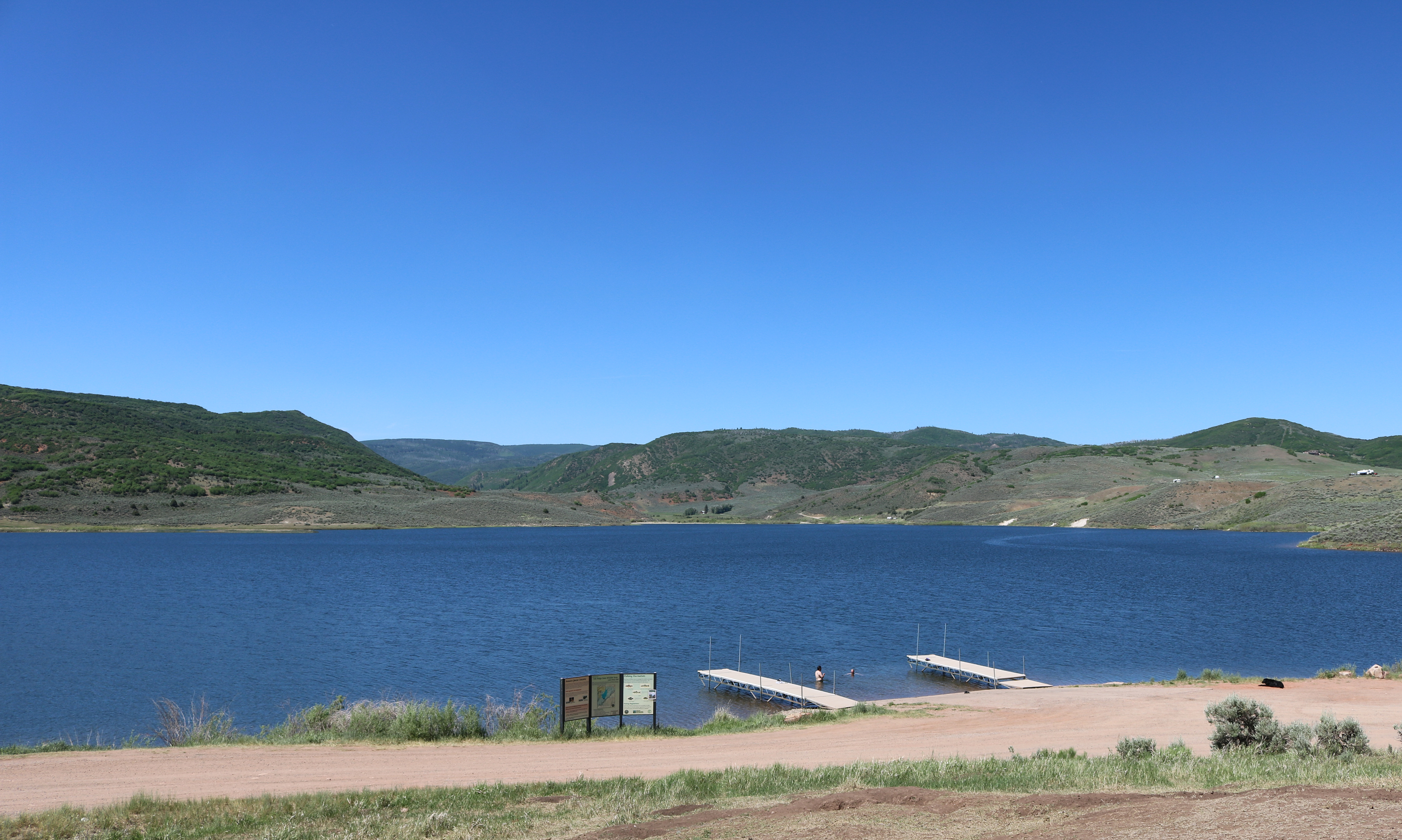
- Lake Avery and part of Oak Ridge State Wildlife Area

- Location in Colorado
- Location: Rio Blanco County, Colorado
- Coordinates: 39°58′18″N 107°38′50″W
- Type: reservoir
- Primary inflows: Big Beaver Creek
- Primary outflows: Big Beaver Creek; Big Beaver Ditch
- Managing agency: Colorado Parks and Wildlife
- Designation: Oak Ridge State Wildlife Area
- Built: 1964
- Surface area: 99 hectares (240 acres)
- Max. depth: 79 feet (24 m)
- Water volume: 9,762 acre-feet (12,041,000 cubic meters)
- Surface elevation: 6,988 feet (2,130 meters)

Lake Avery is a reservoir in Rio Blanco County, Colorado about 20 miles southeast of the town of Meeker. It also lies west of the unincorporated community of Buford. The reservoir is owned by Colorado Parks and Wildlife, and its dam impounds Big Beaver Creek, a tributary of the White River. Lake Avery is also called Big Beaver Reservoir, but it is unclear whether the name has changed or whether the reservoir just has two names.

== State wildlife area ==
The lake and a large area of land surrounding it are part of the 13,664-acre (5,530-hectare) Oak Ridge State Wildlife Area. The wildlife area comprises six units or divisions, including the Bel Aire Unit, the Lake Avery Unit, the Oak Ridge Unit, the Jon Wangnild Unit, the Sleepy Cat Ponds Unit, and the Sleepy Cat Fishing Easement. The wildlife area offers deer, elk, rabbit, dusky (blue) grouse, dove, and waterfowl hunting, coldwater stream fishing, and camping, hiking, and wildlife viewing. The lake has two boat ramps. Lake Avery contains both rainbow and cutthroat trout.

In 2018, due to dangerously high temperatures and low flow rates in the White River that endangered trout species, Colorado Parks and Wildlife began releasing water from Lake Avery to the White River for the first time since 2012. They were permitted to discharge water at a rate of 20 cubic feet per second for 120 days.

== Dam ==
The dam, called Big Beaver Dam, (National ID # CO00962) is a 102-foot tall earthen dam built in 1964. In 2022, the dam was classified as a "high hazard dam" by the State of Colorado due to the property damage it would cause if breached. Its quality has declined over the years. Beginning in 2024, Colorado Parks and Wildlife has begun draining the reservoir in order to facilitate the dam repairs. Public access will end beginning 25 November 2024; repairs have been scheduled to begin in Spring 2025.

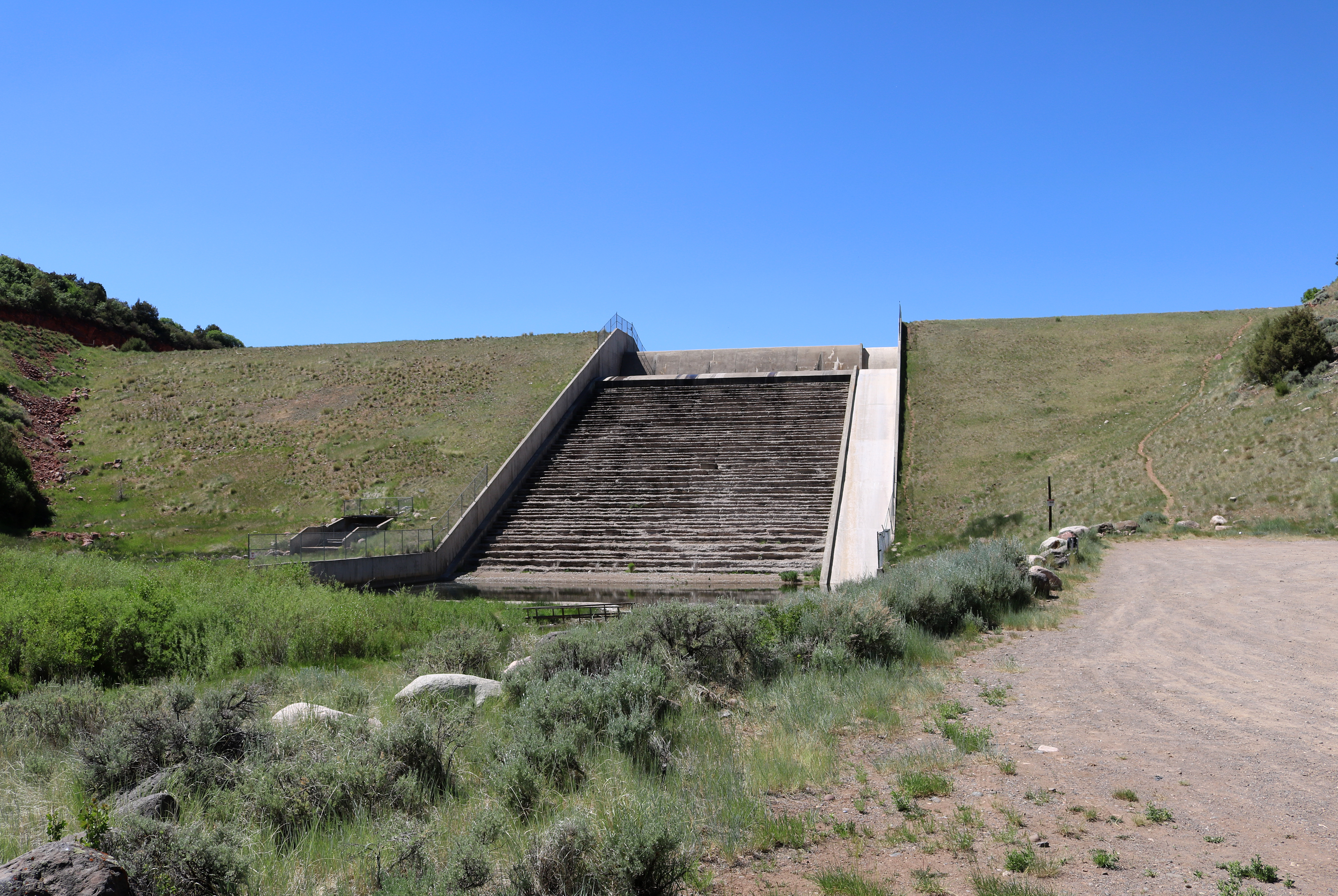
Big Beaver Dam and its spillway
