= O'Haver Lake =

Reservoir in Colorado, United States

- Lake O'Haver
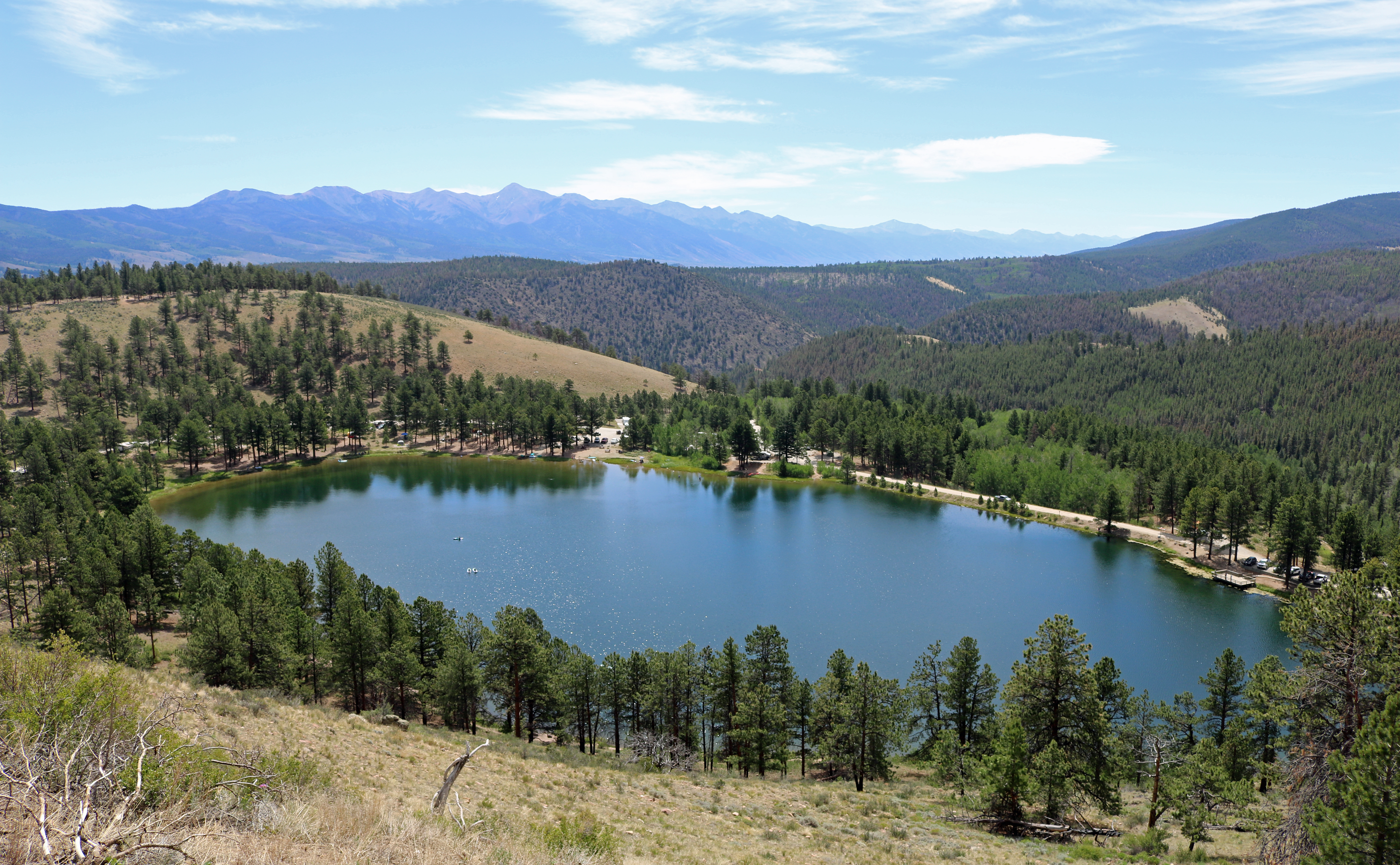
- A view of the lake from Forest Road 200

- O'Haver Lake
- Location: Chaffee County, Colorado
- Coordinates: 38°25′38″N 106°08′46″W
- Etymology: Named for former Chaffee County Commissioner R.T. O'Haver.
- Primary inflows: Gray's Creek by means of the O'Haver filler ditch
- Primary outflows: Ditch back to Gray's Creek
- Basin countries: United States
- Managing agency: Upper Arkansas Water Conservancy District
- Built: 1949
- Surface area: 15 acres (6.1 hectares)
- Water volume: 186.7 acre-feet (230,300 cubic meters)
- Surface elevation: 9,130 feet (2,780 meters)
- Frozen: Freezes in winter

O'Haver Lake is a reservoir in Chaffee County, Colorado in the San Isabel National Forest. It is located about two miles from U.S. Highway 50 west of Poncha Pass. The lake and adjacent campground are just off Forest Road 200, also known as Marshall Pass Road. The pass is about twelve miles up the road from the lake.

== Campground ==
The United States Forest Service operates the O'Haver Lake Campground, which is right next to the lake. The campground has 31 campsites and is heavily used, especially on weekends. The area around the lake is forested with ponderosa pine and aspen trees.

The lake is stocked with trout.
