= Acascosa Lake =

Lake in Colorado, United States

- Location within the United States
- Location: Conejos County, Colorado
- Coordinates: 37°16′27″N 106°27′15″W
- Basin countries: United States
- Surface elevation: 10,984 feet (3,348 m)

Acascosa Lake /ɑːkəˈskoʊsə/ is a lake in Conejos County, Colorado, United States. Its surface elevation is 10,984 feet (3,348 m).

The name "Acascosa" probably comes from Spanish agua ascosa, meaning "stagnant water".

It is located just under 20 miles from Capulin, Colorado.
