= Boyd Lake State Park =

State park in Colorado, United States

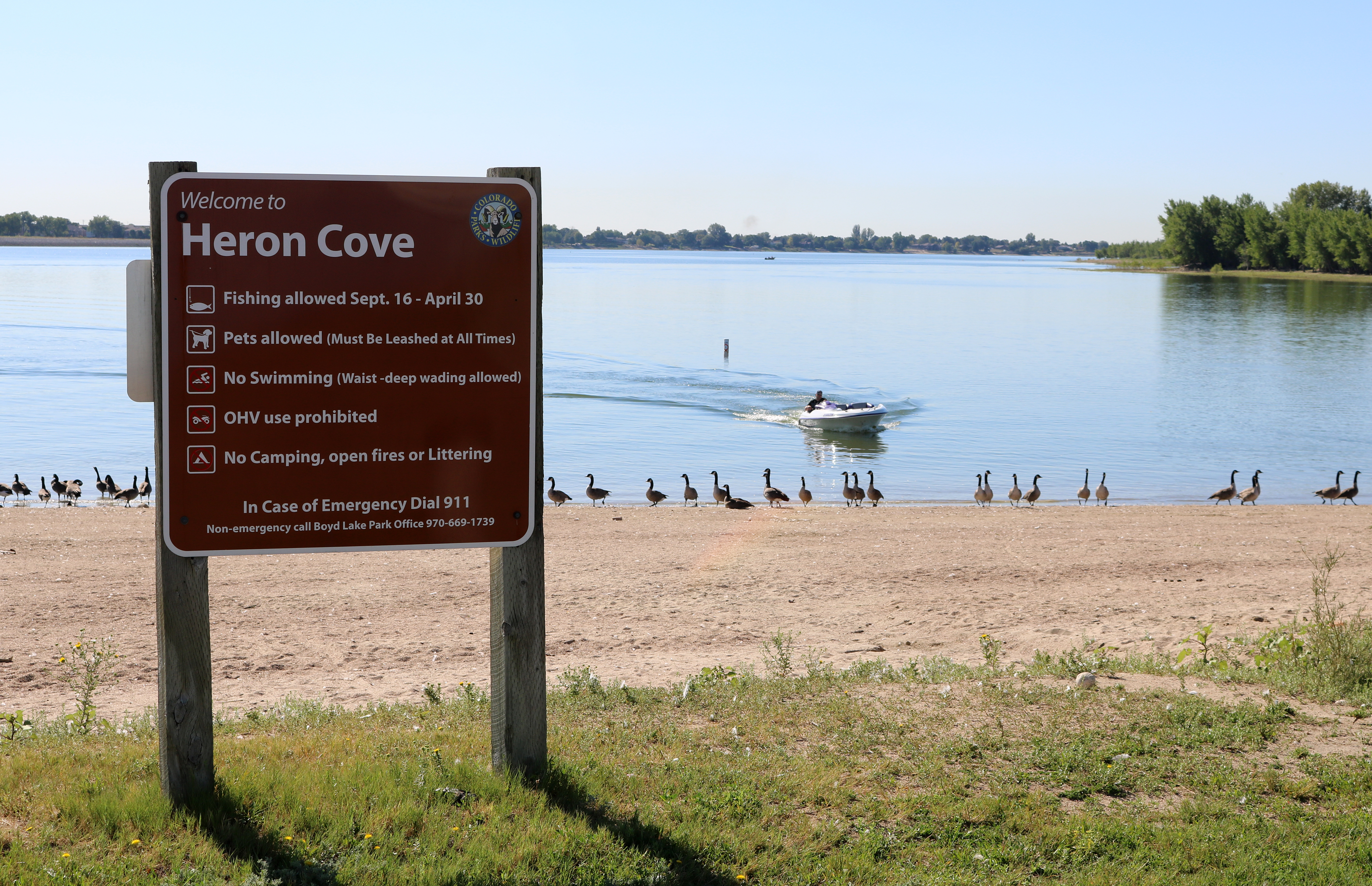
- Heron Cove on Boyd Lake.

- Location within Colorado
- Location: Larimer County, Colorado, USA
- Nearest city: Loveland, Colorado
- Coordinates: 40°26′05″N 105°02′24″W
- Area: 334 acres (1.35 km^{2})
- Established: 1965
- Visitors: 752,460 (in 2021)
Governing body
Colorado Parks and Wildlife
Boyd Lake
- Surface area: 1,700 acres (6.9 km^{2})
- Surface elevation: 1,510 m (4,950 ft)
- Interactive map of Boyd Lake

Boyd Lake State Park is a state park in the U.S. state of Colorado, located north of Loveland, Colorado. It became a state recreation area under the Colorado Division of Game, Fish, and Parks in 1965. The park sometimes holds events for the public including fishing derbies and clinics, education programs, and volunteer projects. Activities permitted within the park include boating, fishing, picnicking, swimming, hiking, biking, and hunting. The park's centerpiece, Boyd Lake, is 1,700 acres (6.9 km^{2}).

== See also ==
- List of largest reservoirs of Colorado
