= Crawford Dam =

Dam in Delta County, Colorado, United States

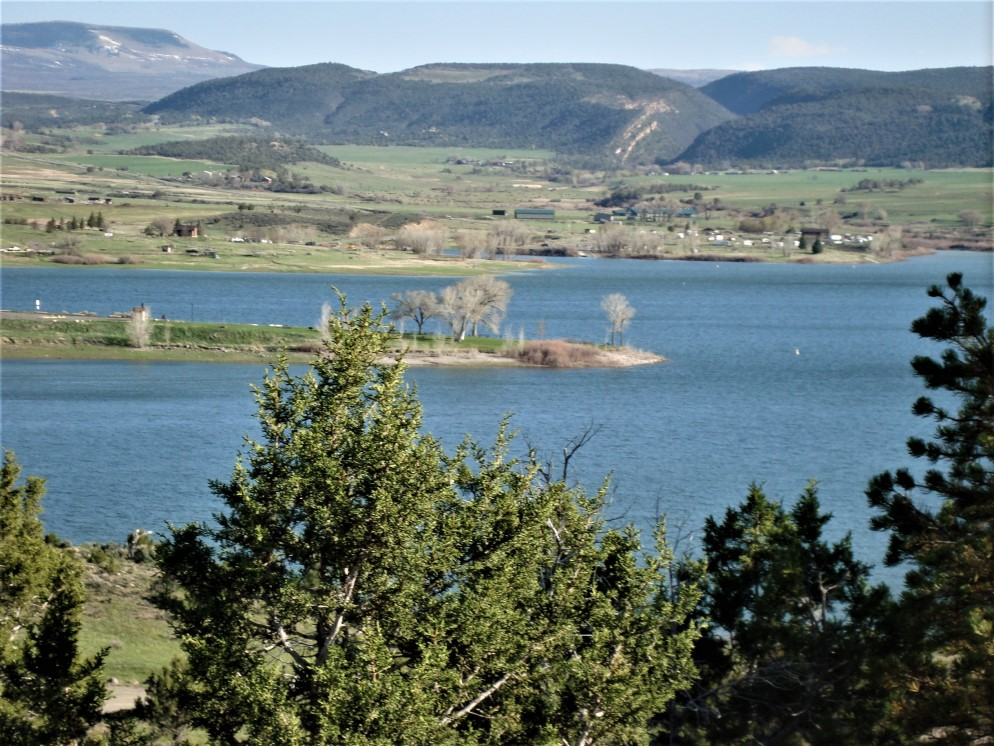
- Crawford State Park and Reservoir

- Location within the United States Location within Colorado
- Country: United States
- Location: Delta County, Colorado
- Coordinates: 38°41′24″N 107°36′25″W
- Purpose: irrigation, flood control
- Status: Operational
- Opening date: 1962
- Built by: United States Bureau of Reclamation
- Owner: United States Bureau of Reclamation
- Operator: Crawford Water Conservancy District

Dam and spillways
- Type of dam: earthen
- Impounds: Iron Creek
- Height (foundation): 162 ft (49 m)
- Length: 580 ft (180 m)

Reservoir
- Creates: Crawford Reservoir
- Total capacity: 14,395 acre⋅ft (17,756,000 m^{3})
- Surface area: 406 acres (164 ha)
- Normal elevation: 1,999 m (6,558 ft)

Crawford Dam (National ID # CO00556) impounds water for Crawford Reservoir in Delta County, Colorado about a mile south of the town of Crawford. The earthen dam was completed in 1962 by the United States Bureau of Reclamation with a height of 162 feet (49 m) and 580 feet (180 m) long at its crest. It impounds Iron Creek for irrigation flood control, one element of the Smith Fork Project. The dam is owned by the Bureau and operated by the local Crawford Water Conservancy District. When full, Crawford Reservoir has a water surface area of 406 acres (164 ha), about 7 miles (11 km) of shoreline, and a total capacity of 14,395 acre-feet (17,756,000 m^{3}). The main purpose of the facility is to provide farm irrigation, and the size of Crawford Reservoir changes significantly with the seasons. In most years, the lake is full in late Spring and early Summer, but by early Fall, the water level drops enough to leave boat launches high and dry. The low water pool lasts through the Winter until Spring runoff begins to fill the water supply once again.
The reservoir is encompassed within Crawford State Park with Park Headquarters located on a peninsula along the northeastern shore. Recreation opportunities include fishing (for yellow perch, northern pike, black crappie, largemouth bass, trout, channel catfish, etc.), boating, camping on 66 campsites, picnicking, swimming, and hiking.
