= Willow Creek (Colorado) =

Tributary of the Colorado River, US

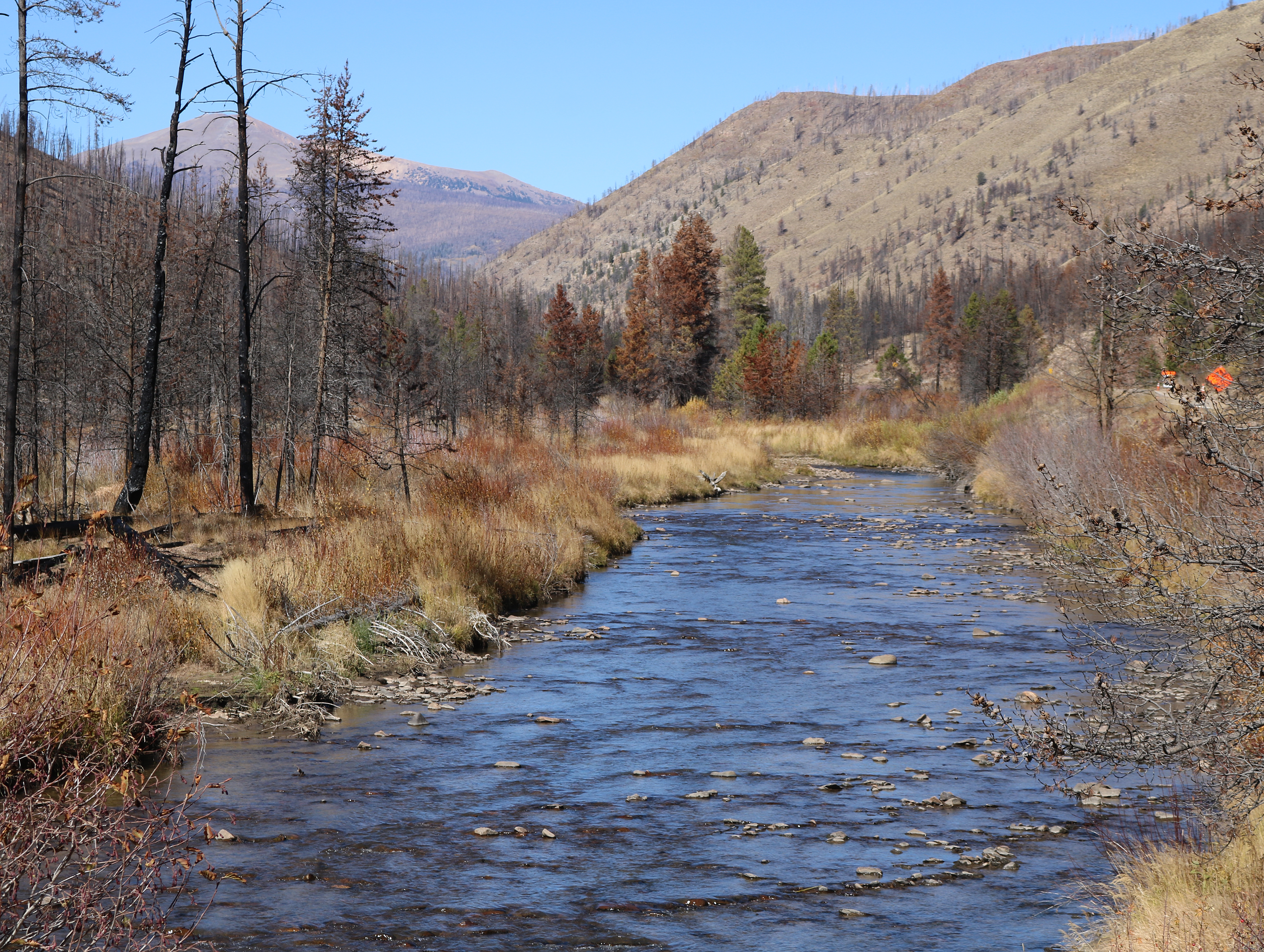
- The creek in October 2022, showing damage caused by the 2020 East Troublesome Fire

Physical characteristics
- Source
  - coordinates: 40°14′45″N 105°59′35″W
- Mouth
  - location: Confluence with Colorado River
  - coordinates: 40°07′08″N 105°55′14″W
  - elevation: 7,936 ft (2,419 m)

Basin features
- Progression: Colorado

Willow Creek is a tributary of the Colorado River, approximately 35 miles (56 km) long, in north central Colorado in the United States.

It rises in northwestern Grand County, in the Arapaho National Forest south of Willow Creek Pass at the continental divide. It flows southeast through Willow Creek Reservoir and joins the Colorado three miles northeast of Granby.

== See also ==
- List of rivers of Colorado
- List of tributaries of the Colorado River
