= Fern Lake =

Lake in Larimer County, Colorado, United States

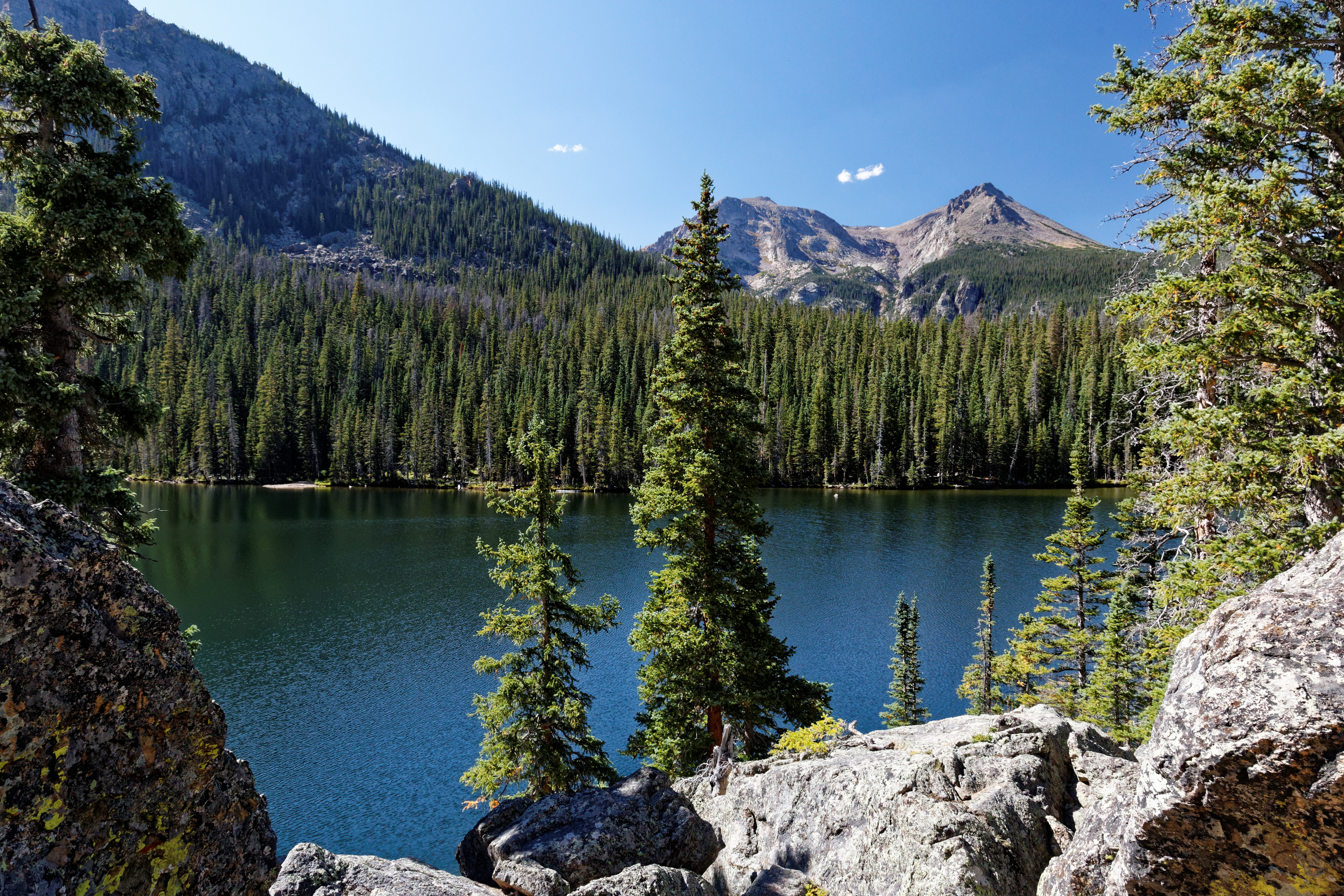

- Location within Colorado Location within the United States
- Location: Rocky Mountain National Park, Larimer County, Colorado, US
- Coordinates: 40°20′12″N 105°40′35″W
- Primary outflows: Big Thompson River
- Basin countries: United States

Fern Lake is an alpine lake in Larimer County, Colorado, United States. It is a major source for the Big Thompson River.
