= Crawford, Colorado =

Town in Colorado, US

- Statutory town
- Town of Crawford
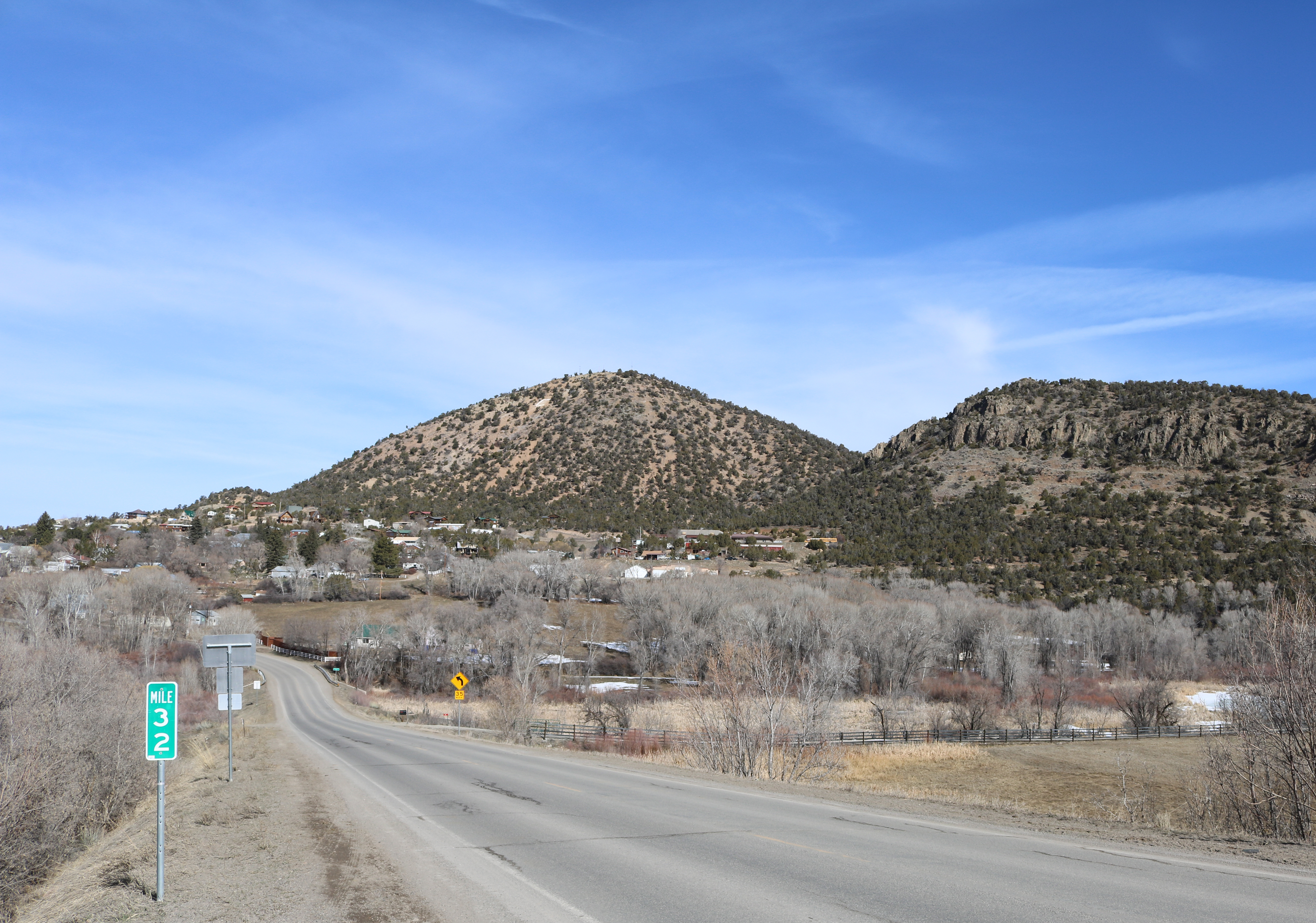
- Crawford in 2016.
- Nickname: Crawford Country USA
- Location of the Town of Crawford in Delta County, Colorado
- Coordinates: 38°42′18″N 107°36′35″W
- Country: United States
- State: Colorado
- County: Delta
- Incorporated: December 19, 1910

Government
  - Type: Statutory town

Area
  - Total: 0.251 sq mi (0.651 km^{2})
  - Land: 0.251 sq mi (0.651 km^{2})
  - Water: 0 sq mi (0.000 km^{2})
- Elevation: 6,559 ft (1,999 m)

Population (2020)
  - Total: 403
  - Density: 1,603/sq mi (619/km^{2})
- Time zone: UTC−07:00 (MST)
  - Summer (DST): UTC−06:00 (MDT)
- ZIP code: 81415
- Area codes: 970/748
- GNIS town ID: 2412382
- FIPS code: 17925

The Town of Crawford is a statutory town in Delta County, Colorado, United States. The town population was 403 at the 2020 United States census. The surrounding mesas and valleys support a farming and ranching community.

== History ==
Crawford was founded in 1882. The town was named for George A. Crawford, governor-elect of Kansas and a founder of Grand Junction, Colorado. The Crawford, Colorado, post office opened on April 14, 1883.

=== Pioneer Days ===
For 40 years during the second weekend in June, Crawford Country holds a town festival called Pioneer Days, starting with a parade and ending with a fireworks display over the reservoir at Crawford State Park.

The Pioneer Days' schedule usually includes a locally produced Melodrama starting on Thursday evening and followed by 2 shows on Saturday. Friday evening includes a benefit auction, baking contest, and Fire Auxiliary BBQ dinner at Town Hall. Saturday includes craft booths, throwing a horseshoe, and racing outhouses. The finale is the fireworks display on Saturday evening at Crawford State Park.

== Geography ==
Crawford is located seventy highway miles southeast of Grand Junction.

At the 2020 United States census, the town had a total area of 161 acres (0.651 km^{2}), all of it land.

== Demographics ==
Historical population
Census	Pop.	Note	%±
1920	149		—
1930	157		5.4%
1940	221		40.8%
1950	170		−23.1%
1960	147		−13.5%
1970	171		16.3%
1980	268		56.7%
1990	221		−17.5%
2000	366		65.6%
2010	431		17.8%
2020	403		−6.5%
U.S. Decennial Census

As of the census of 2000, there were 366 people, 147 households, and 104 families residing in the town. The population density was 1,409.8 inhabitants per square mile (544.3/km^{2}). There were 179 housing units at an average density of 689.5 units per square mile (266.2 units/km^{2}). The racial makeup of the town was 96.72% White, 1.64% from other races, and 1.64% from two or more races. Hispanic or Latino of any race were 2.19% of the population.

There were 147 households, out of which 36.7% had children under the age of 18 living with them, 51.7% were married couples living together, 12.9% had a female householder with no husband present, and 28.6% were non-families. 25.9% of all households were made up of individuals, and 14.3% had someone living alone who was 65 years of age or older. The average household size was 2.49 and the average family size was 2.88.

In the town, the population was spread out, with 30.3% under the age of 18, 5.7% from 18 to 24, 27.3% from 25 to 44, 21.3% from 45 to 64, and 15.3% who were 65 years of age or older. The median age was 36 years. For every 100 females, there were 108.0 males. For every 100 females age 18 and over, there were 96.2 males.

The median income for a household in the town was $23,281, and the median income for a family was $27,500. Males had a median income of $37,917 versus $16,563 for females. The per capita income for the town was $13,284. About 23.5% of families and 29.4% of the population were below the poverty line, including 45.8% of those under age 18 and 15.9% of those age 65 or over.

== Notable residents ==
- Joe Cocker (1944–2014), English singer

== See also ==
- Black Canyon of the Gunnison National Park
