= Paonia State Park =

State park located in Gunnison County, Colorado

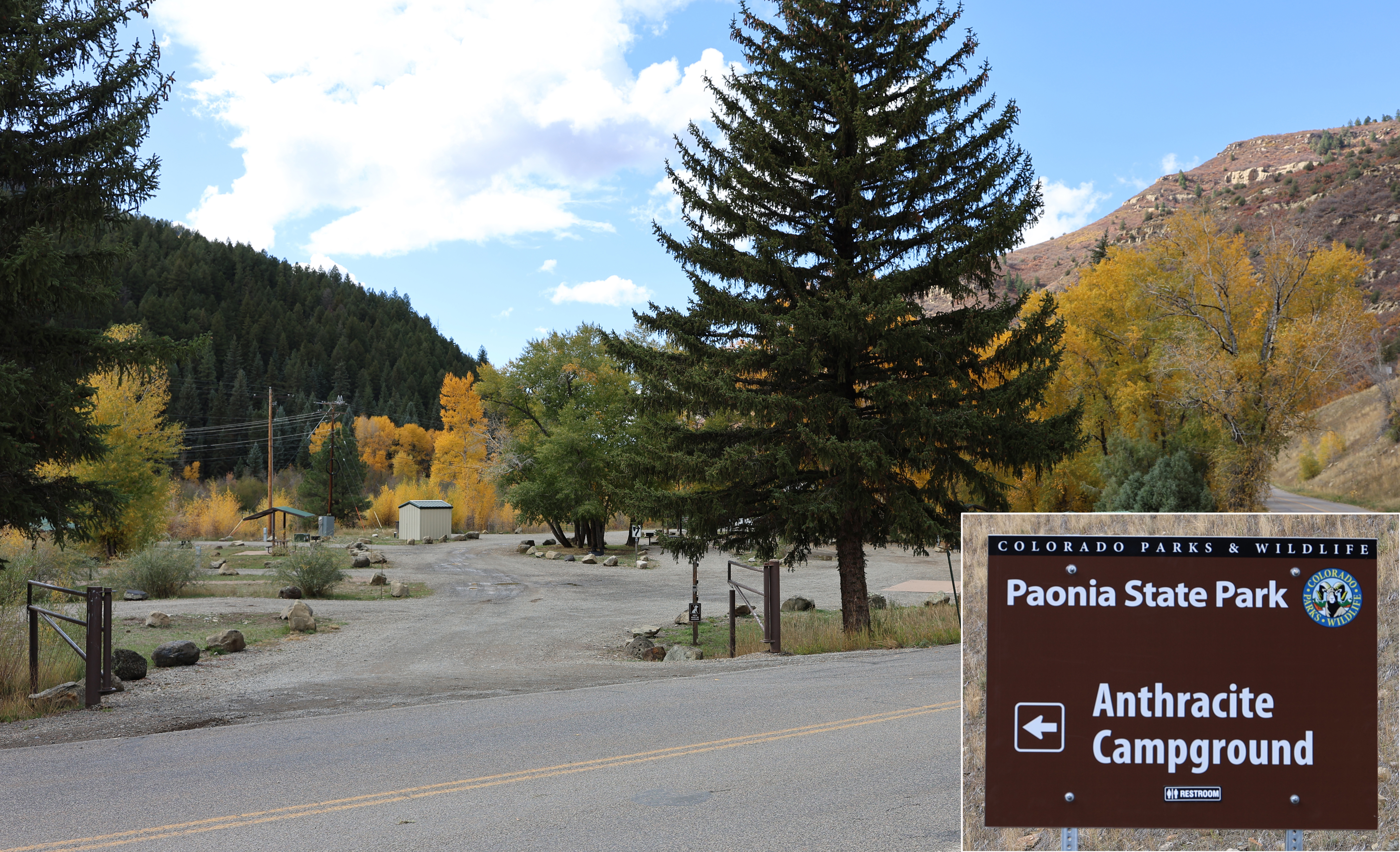
- Anthracite Campground in the park (2025)

- Location within Colorado
- Location: Gunnison County, Colorado, USA
- Nearest city: Paonia, Colorado
- Coordinates: 38°58′58″N 107°20′44″W
- Area: 1,857 acres (7.52 km^{2})
- Established: 1964
- Visitors: 54,333 (in 2021)
- Governing body: Colorado Parks and Wildlife

Paonia State Park is a Colorado State Park located in Gunnison County east of Paonia, Colorado. The 1,857-acre (7.52 km^{2}) park lies in a canyon surrounding Paonia Reservoir on Muddy Creek and was established in 1964.

== Facilities ==
Park facilities include campsites, picnic sites and a boat ramp.

== Geology, flora and fauna ==
Geologic formations from the Cretaceous and Paleocene periods are visible in the park, along with fossilized palm fronds and leaf imprints. Park uplands are gambel oak shrublands along with mixed conifer and aspen forests. Commonly seen wildlife include mule deer, elk, cottontail rabbit and marmot.

== Dam ==
Paonia Reservoir's dam, Paonia Dam, impounds Muddy Creek. The dam's NID ID is CO01691. It stores water exclusively for the Fire Mountain Canal, a ditch that delivers water to agricultural users in the North Fork Valley of Delta County, Colorado. The dam was built by the Bureau of Reclamation. It is an earthen dam that is 199 feet (61 meters) high, stores 23,230 acre-feet (28,650,000 cubic meters) of water, and was completed in 1962.

== Streams ==
Below the dam, Muddy Creek joins with Anthracite Creek to form the North Fork Gunnison River.
