= Lost Man Reservoir =

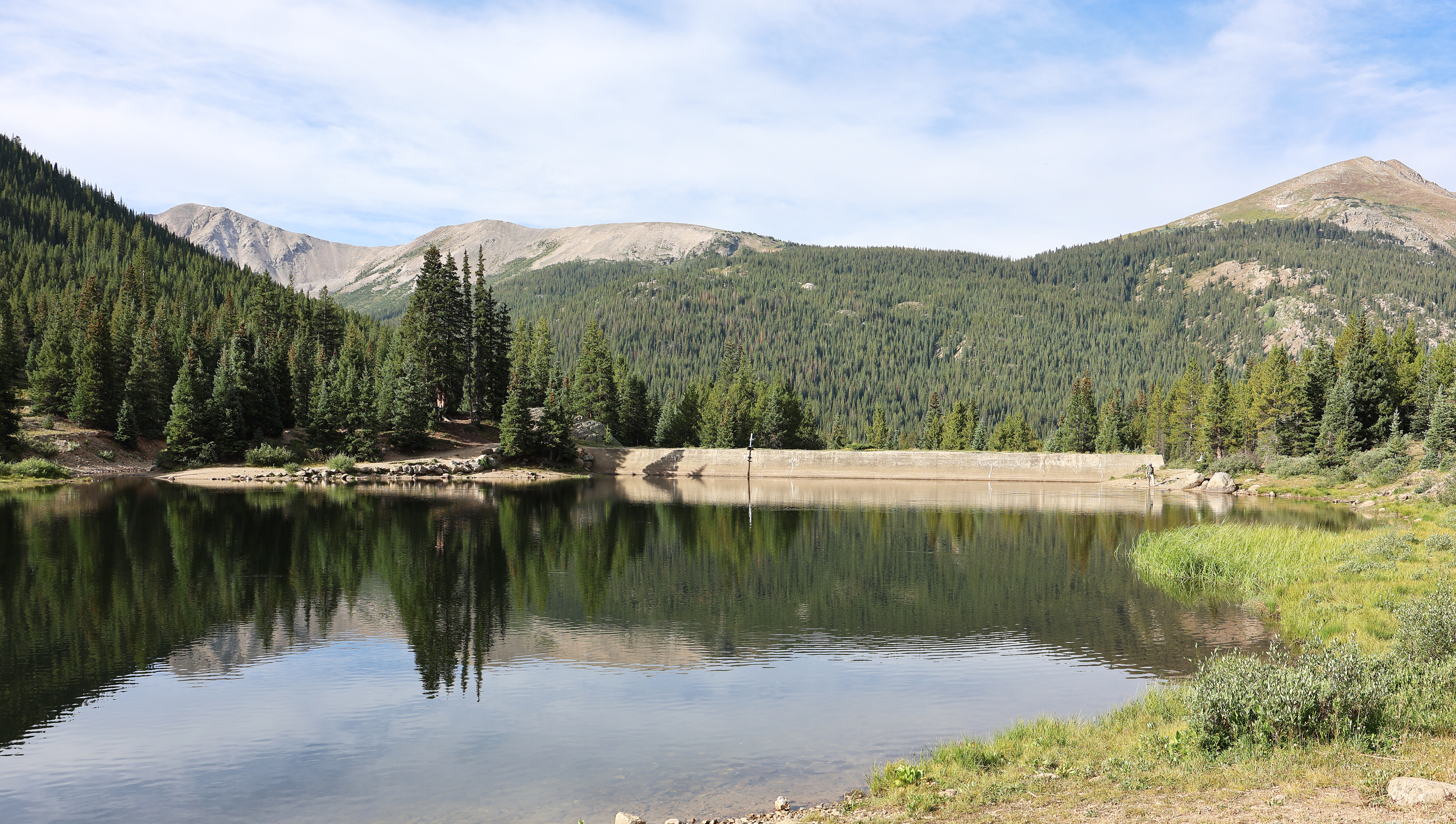
- The reservoir in 2025

- The reservoir's location in Colorado
- Location: Pitkin County, Colorado, U.S.
- Coordinates: 39°07′37.72″N 106°37′9.66″W
- Type: reservoir
- Primary inflows: Lost Man Creek
- Primary outflows: Lost Man Connection Canal; Lost Man Creek
- Basin countries: United States
- Managing agency: Twin Lakes Reservoir and Canal Company
- Surface elevation: 10,588 feet (3,227 meters)

Lost Man Reservoir is in Pitkin County, Colorado, U.S. The reservoir, which lies at an elevation of 10,588 feet (3,227 meters) in Colorado's Sawatch Range, in the White River National Forest.

== Dam ==
The dam impounds Lost Man Creek. It is a small diversion dam that diverts most of Lost Man Creek's flow to the Lost Man Connection Canal. The dam is not included in the National Inventory of Dams database. The dam and reservoir are components of the Independence Pass Transmountain Diversion System, a transbasin diversion that conveys water from the Roaring Fork River and some of its upper tributaries to cities and agricultural users in the Front Range Urban Corridor.

== Location ==
The dam and reservoir are about 1/2 mile (0.80 kilometers) from Colorado State Highway 82 along the Lost Man Trail. There is a parking area at the trailhead alongside the highway. Lost Man Lake is further up the trail, which follows Lost Man Creek.
