= Crawford State Park (Colorado) =

State park in Colorado

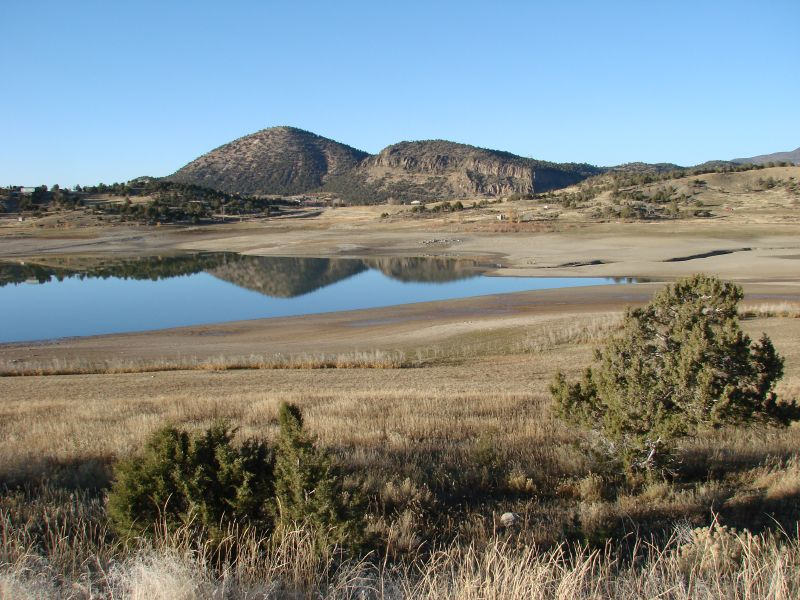
- Crawford Reservoir at low water in 2007

- Location within Colorado
- Location: Delta and Montrose counties, Colorado, U.S.
- Nearest city: Delta
- Coordinates: 38°41′14″N 107°35′44″W
- Area: 734 acres (2.97 km^{2})
- Established: 1967
- Visitors: 172,777 (in 2021)
- Governing body: Colorado Parks and Wildlife

Crawford State Park is a Colorado State Park that encompasses Crawford Reservoir located about 1 mile (1.6 km) south of the town of Crawford in Delta County, Colorado. The north rim of the Black Canyon of the Gunnison National Park is about 12 miles (19 km) southwest and Delta is about 31 miles (50 km) west on Highway 92.

The 760-acre (3.1 km^{2}) park was established in 1964 on the shore of Crawford Reservoir, a 400 acres (1.6 km^{2}) lake with boat ramps and a swimming beach. Other facilities include camp sites, picnic sites and a visitors center. The park has 1.8 miles (2.9 km) of trails available to both hikers and bicyclists. Plant communities include pinyon-juniper woodlands, sagebrush and small areas of west slope grassland. Wetland and riparian areas are around the reservoir and below the dam.

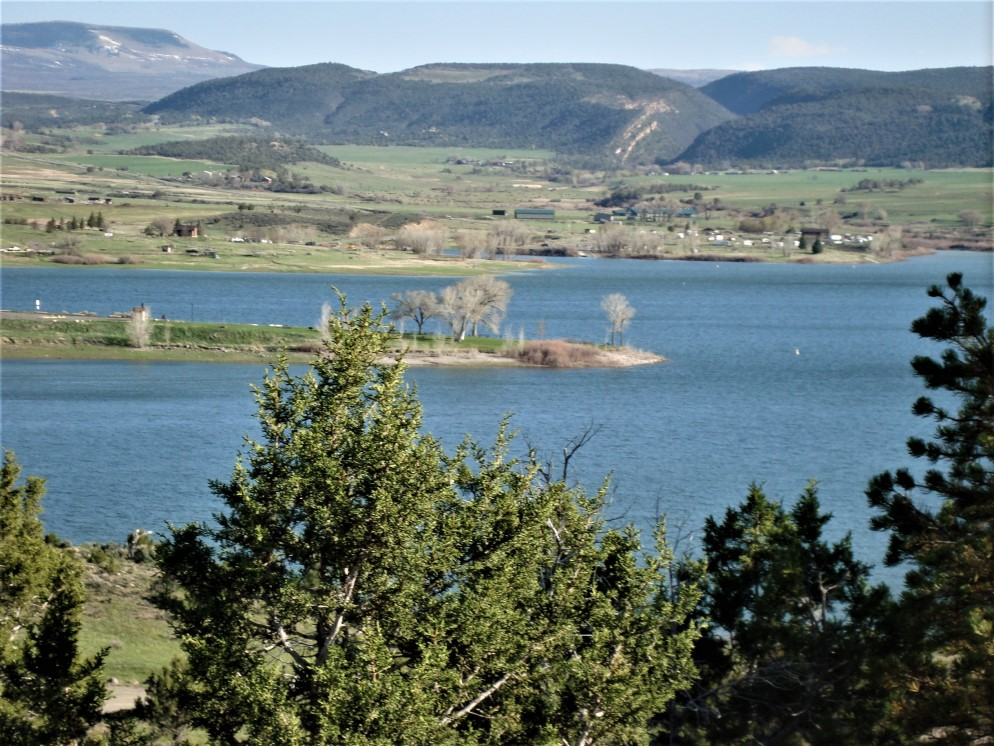
Crawford State Park and Reservoir
