= Willow Creek (Columbia River tributary) =

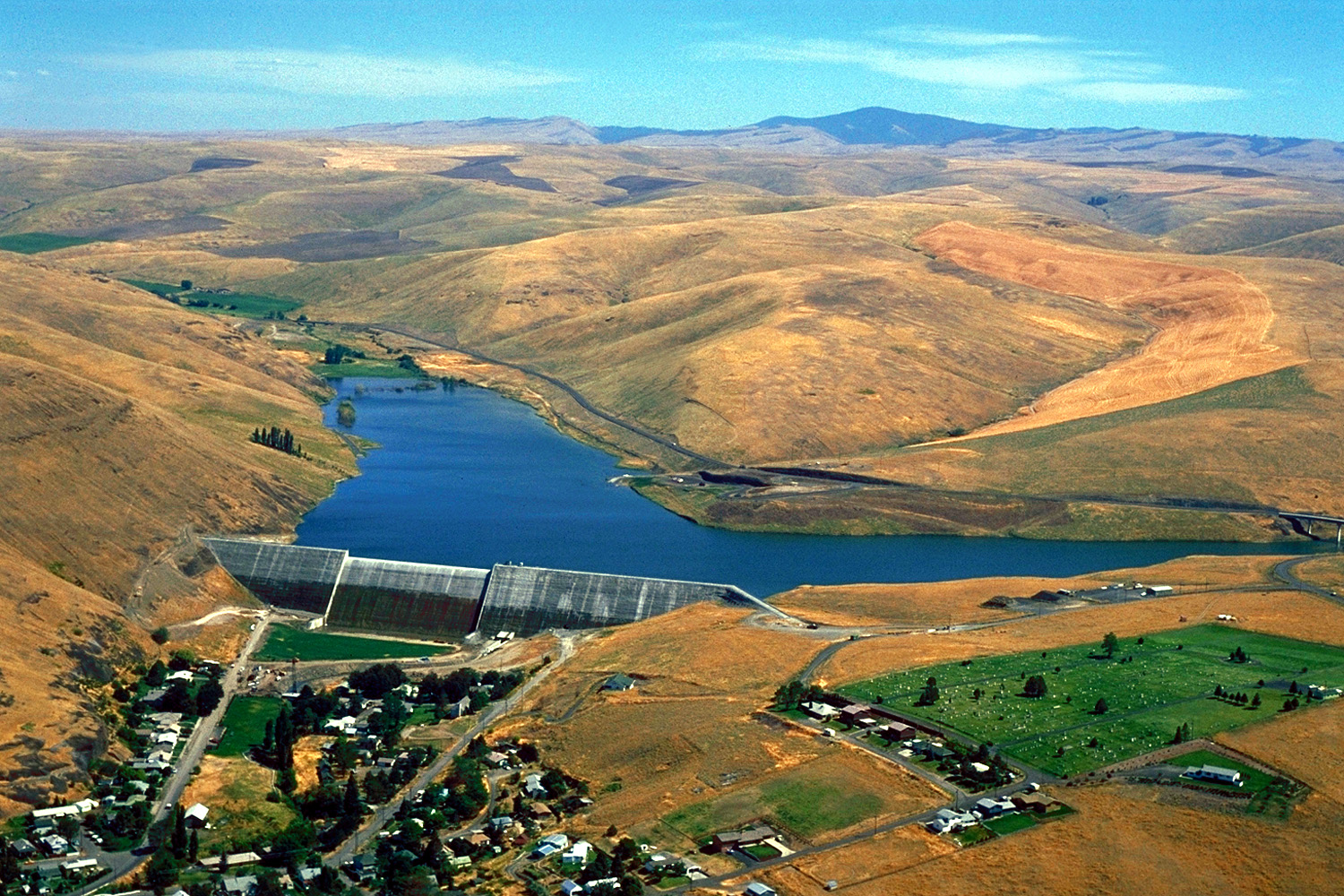
- Willow Creek Lake, an impoundment of Willow Creek, with the city of Heppner below it

- Location of the mouth of Willow Creek in Oregon

Location
- Country: United States
- State: Oregon
- Counties: Morrow and Gilliam

Physical characteristics
- Source: Arbuckle Mountain
  - location: Blue Mountains, Morrow County, Oregon
  - coordinates: 45°09′56″N 119°20′29″W
  - elevation: 4,351 ft (1,326 m) (Note: Source elevation derived from Google Earth search using GNIS source coordinates.)
- Mouth: Columbia River
  - location: upstream of Arlington, Gilliam County, Oregon
  - coordinates: 45°48′21″N 120°00′24″W
  - elevation: 269 ft (82 m)
- Length: 79 mi (127 km)
- Basin size: 880 mi^{2} (2,300 km^{2})
- Discharge
  - location: river mile 4 (river kilometer 6) (Note: The average discharge rate was calculated by adding the average annual discharge rates for the total number of water years for which data was available and dividing by the total number of water years.)
  - average: 31.3 cu ft/s (0.89 m^{3}/s)
  - minimum: 0 cu ft/s (0 m^{3}/s)(Often)
  - maximum: 16,900 cu ft/s (480 m^{3}/s)(January 14, 1974)

Willow Creek is a 79-mile (127 km) long tributary of the Columbia River, located in the U.S. state of Oregon. It drains 880 square miles (2,279 km^{2}) of Morrow and Gilliam counties. Arising in the Blue Mountains, it flows generally northwest to its confluence with the Columbia River upstream of Arlington.

== Course ==
Willow Creek's headwaters are located near Arbuckle Mountain in the Blue Mountains, southeast of Heppner. It flows north, then west, receiving the North Fork on the right and Skinners Fork on the left. Willow Creek Lake is formed by the 160-foot (49 m) tall Willow Creek Dam just upstream of Heppner at river mile (RM) 52.4, or river kilometer (RK) 84.3. Willow Creek flows northwest through Heppner, receiving Hinton Creek on the right. About 10 miles (16 km) later, the creek travels through Lexington. Soon after, Rhea Creek enters on the left, and Willow Creek passes through the communities of Ione and Morgan. Turning north, it crosses into Gilliam County, flowing beneath Highway 74 and Interstate 84/Highway 30 just before its mouth. Willow Creek flows into the Columbia River approximately 253 miles (407 km) above its confluence with the Pacific Ocean.

=== Discharge ===
Location	Drainage basin	Years recorded	Average flow	Maximum flow	Minimum flow
above Willow Creek Lake (RM 54, RK 87)	67.6 mi^{2} (175.1 km^{2})	1983–2009	20.0 cu ft/s (0.6 m^{3}/s)	554 cu ft/s (16 m^{3}/s) (February 1, 1997)	0 cu ft/s (0 m^{3}/s) (Often)
Heppner (RM 52, RK 84)	96.8 mi^{2} (250.7 km^{2})	1952–2009	19.7 cu ft/s (0.6 m^{3}/s)	36,000 cu ft/s (1,000 m^{3}/s) (June 14, 1903)	0 cu ft/s (0 m^{3}/s) (Often)
near Highway 74 (RM 4, RK 6)	850 mi^{2} (2,201 km^{2})	1961–1979	31.3 cu ft/s (0.9 m^{3}/s)	16,900 cu ft/s (480 m^{3}/s) (January 14, 1974)	0 cu ft/s (0 m^{3}/s) (Often)

== Watershed ==
Willow Creek drains 880 square miles (2,279 km^{2}) of the Columbia Plateau region of Oregon. Ninety percent is privately owned, nine percent is owned by U.S. federal agencies such as the United States Forest Service, Bureau of Land Management, and United States Department of Defense, and one percent is owned by the state of Oregon. About 60 percent of the watershed is either forested, rangeland, or shrubland, 39 percent is cropland, and 1 percent is urban. The highest elevation in the watershed is 5,583 feet (1,702 m) near Willow Creek's headwaters, while the lowest is 269 feet (82 m) at its mouth. Temperatures range from below 0 °F (−18 °C) to over 110 °F (43 °C), while the average is about 50 °F (10 °C). The average precipitation ranges from 8 inches (203 mm) in the lower regions to 34 inches (864 mm) in the mountains.

== Fish ==
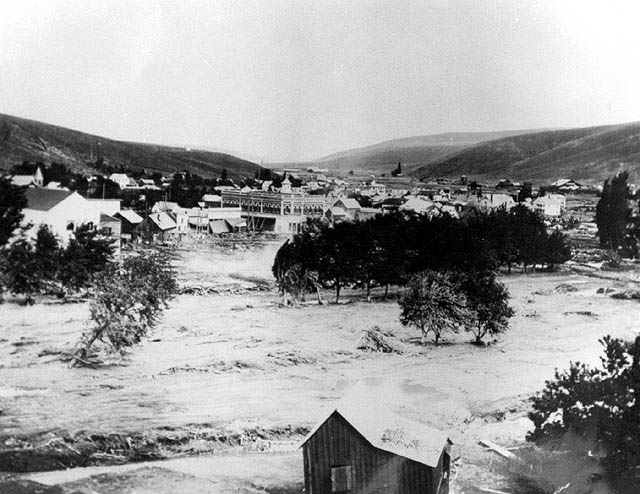
1903 flash flood in Heppner

No anadromous fish are known to inhabit streams in the Willow Creek watershed. Small and largemouth bass, black crappie, brown bullhead, bluegill, and pumpkinseed live in Willow Creek Lake.

== History ==
Strong thunderstorms moved over the Heppner area on June 14, 1903, causing heavy rain and hail. Within fifteen minutes, a 40-foot (10 m) wall of water swept down Willow Creek. The flash flood washed away one-third of the town's structures, killing 247 people in the "most deadly natural disaster in Oregon's recorded history." One hundred and fifty homes were destroyed in the city of Ione, 20 miles (30 km) downstream; residents were able to evacuate because of advanced telephone warnings. In 1983, the Willow Creek Dam was constructed just upstream of Heppner. The resulting Willow Creek Lake's primary use is flood control.

== See also ==
- List of rivers of Oregon
- List of longest streams of Oregon
