= Willow Creek Dam (Oregon) =

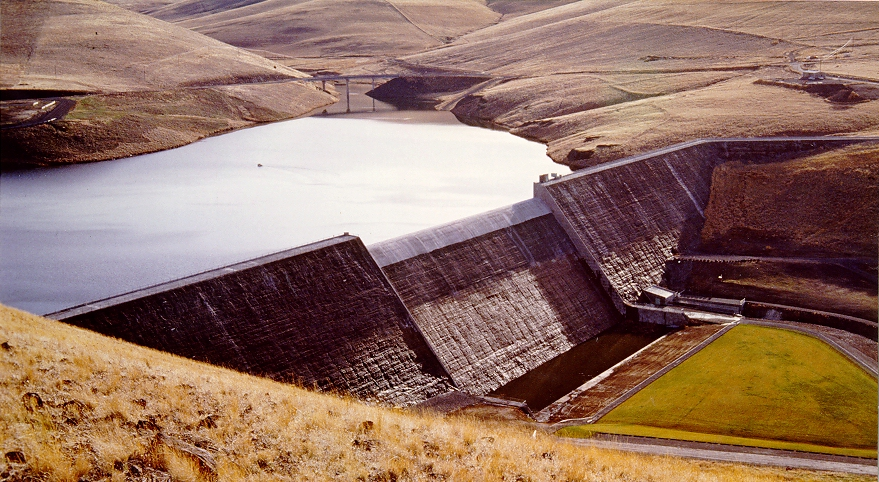
- Willow Creek Dam and Willow Creek Lake
- Interactive map of Willow Creek Dam
- Location: Morrow County, Oregon, U.S.
- Coordinates: 45.34695°N 119.54463°W
- Construction began: 1979
- Opening date: 1983
- Construction cost: $37,231,332 (as of June 18, 1997)
- Operator: U.S. Army Corps of Engineers

Dam and spillways
- Impounds: Willow Creek
- Height: 160 feet (49 m)

Reservoir
- Creates: Willow Creek Lake
- Total capacity: gross 13,250 acre-feet (16,340,000 m^{3}) usable 9,765 acre-feet (12,045,000 m^{3})
- Catchment area: 96 square miles (250 km^{2})
- Surface area: 126 acres (51 ha) max 95 acres (38 ha) min

Willow Creek Dam is a dam in Morrow County of the U.S. state of Oregon, located just east of Heppner's city limits. It was the first major dam in the United States constructed of roller-compacted concrete.

The dam's drainage basin is 96 square miles (250 km^{2}) of arid rolling hills in the lower basin but with headwaters in the northern Umatilla National Forest. The dam's original purpose was primarily to store water for flood control, but also to serve recreation, fish and wildlife, and irrigation uses. The dam impounds Willow Creek to create Willow Creek Lake.

The lake level can be a maximum of 2,113.5 feet (644.2 m) elevation and a minimum of 2,063.0 feet (628.8 m) for a total usable storage capacity of 9,765 acre-feet (12,045,000 m^{3}).

== History ==
A major flood killed approximately one quarter of Heppner's population in June 1903—about 250 people. The flooding creek flow was 36,000 cubic feet per second (1,000 m^{3}/s) as a result of a flash flood caused by thunderstorms, known as the Heppner Flood of 1903.

A flood control study was completed in 1962 at a total cost of $219. In 1965, a flood control project was authorized by U.S. Congress.

In 1979, the purpose of a dam project was changed to defer irrigation development for the future and eliminate water supply and water quality control.

Construction feasibility tests in 1972 placed a few layers of roller-compacted concrete. A 1:36 model (one inch equals three feet) was built and studied to determine downstream flooding and pool siltation characteristics as affected by the dam's spillway.

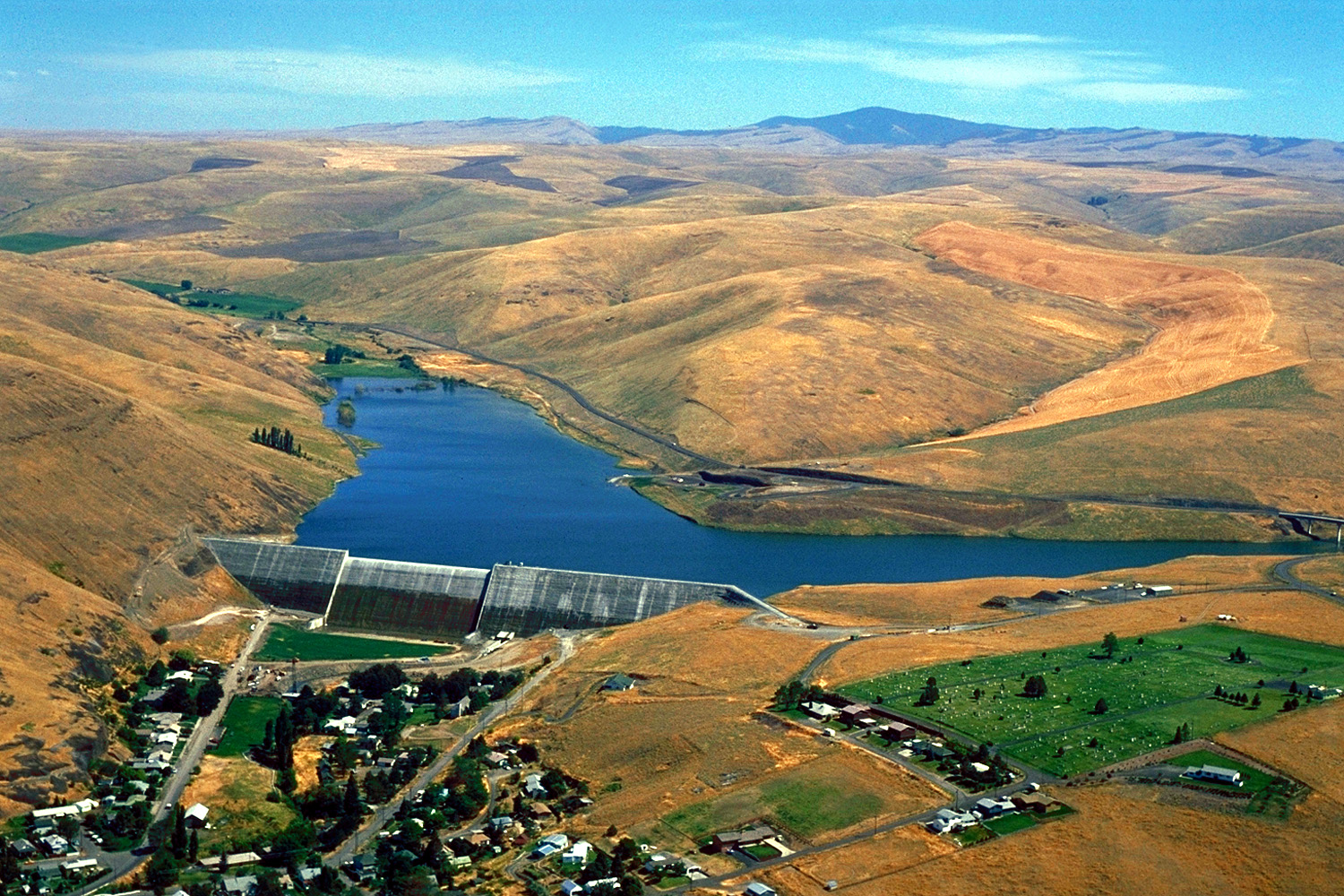
Heppner, in the foreground, is protected by Willow Creek Dam from arid basin drainage subject to thunderstorms

The dam was constructed by the Army Corps of Engineers between November 1981 and February 1983. Construction completed nearly on schedule, despite the workers initially being unfamiliar with the materials, processing, and techniques. It came in less than its budget of $50 million at $35 million. The dam's construction validated economic and construction speed benefits where 330,000 cubic meters (430,000 yd^{3}) of concrete were finished in less than five months at about $17 per cubic meter ($13/yd^{3}), which includes additional efforts to correct defects.

However, as soon as the lake began filling, significant leakage was evident through the seams of the layers of concrete. The lake was drained and a $2 million remedial effort included injecting grout through bores drilled from top to bottom. The initial rate of leakage was 33 cubic meters per second (1,200 cu ft/s). After remediation, the leakage was less than 11 cubic meters per second (390 cu ft/s). Concern over the dam's safety has continued, especially with the memory of the 1903 flash flood.

Within a few years of construction, problems were noted with stratification of the water and anoxic decomposition producing hydrogen sulfide. Concerns were expressed that this could in turn give rise to sulfuric acid leading to concrete damage. Controversy continued for some years and the handling of the problem itself was criticized. In 2004, an aeration plant was installed to address the root cause, as had been called for 18 years earlier. Subsequent controversy surrounded the politics of a small town being used as an experiment for new construction technology. SolarBee devices to circulate the water were installed in 2009.

The dam won an American Society of Civil Engineers (ASCE) award in 1985.

== See also ==
- List of lakes in Oregon
