= Willow Creek Dam (Colorado) =

Coordinates: 40°08′51″N 105°56′31″W

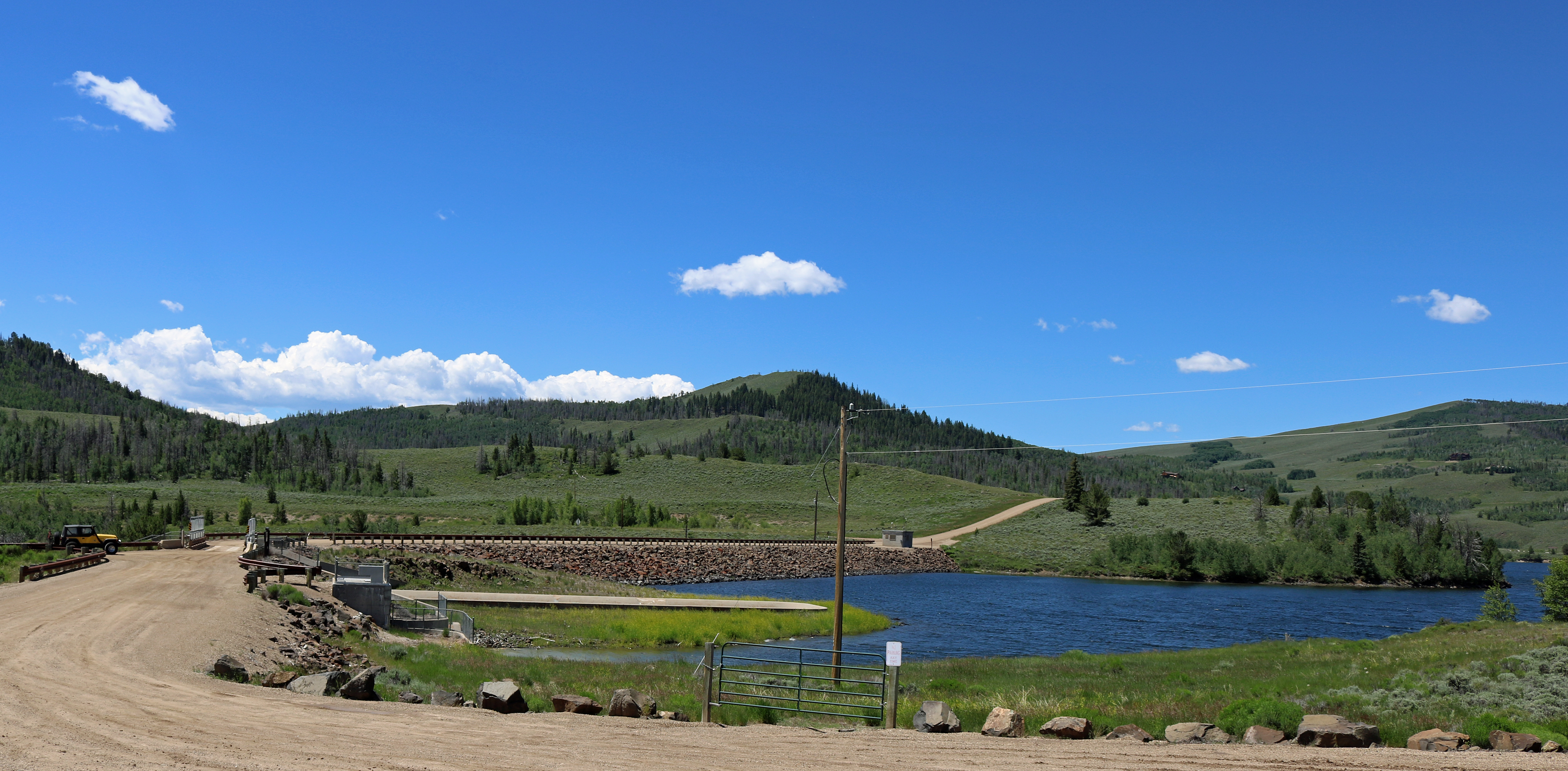
- Interactive map of Willow Creek Dam
- Country: United States
- Location: Grand County, Colorado
- Status: Operational
- Construction began: 1951
- Opening date: 1953
- Designed by: United States Bureau of Reclamation

Willow Creek Dam (National ID # CO01670) is a dam in Grand County, Colorado.

The earthen dam was constructed between 1951 and 1953 by the United States Bureau of Reclamation, with a height of 127 feet (39 m), and a length of 1,100 feet (340 m) at its crest. It impounds Willow Creek for irrigation water storage and hydroelectric power, part of the Bureau's larger Colorado-Big Thompson Project. The dam is owned by the Bureau and operated by the local Northern Colorado Water Conservancy District.

The reservoir it creates, Willow Creek Reservoir, has a normal water surface of 303 acres (123 ha), and has a maximum capacity of 11,177 acre-feet (13,787,000 m^{3}). Recreation includes camping and fishing (for brown trout, rainbow trout, and salmon).
