= List of Colorado fish hatcheries =

Coordinates: 38.9972°N 105.5478°W

List of Colorado fish hatcheries (Colorado)

This is a list of fish hatcheries in the U.S. State of Colorado.

Fish hatcheries are an important tool in the scientific world for native fish species conservation. There is an abundance of environmental impacts which have caused an expansion in the captive breeding programs to prevent the extinction of many population. Specific impacts that are protected against in hatcheries include habitat loss, pollution and more natural causes such as predation, competitors, or disease. The goal of many fish hatcheries is to preserve natural species with the intention of releasing them back into their natural habitat.

Since hatcheries have a significant impact within the conservation field, there are a wide distribution and varying purpose among the facilities. In Colorado, there is a total of 18 hatcheries raising 30+ species of fish which Colorado Parks and Wildlife (CPW) operate. Twelve of these hatcheries are cold water facilities, two are warm water facilities, two are cold and warm water, and two are USFWS hatcheries. The missions of these various hatcheries vary from production for angling stock to native species recovery, with focus on fish such as cutthroat trout, rainbow trout, largemouth bass and many more.

== Hatcheries ==
Hatchery Name	Location	Cold or Warm Water Facility
Bellvue-Watson Fish Hatchery	Bellvue, CO	Cold
Chalk Cliffs Rearing Unit	Nathrop, CO	Cold
Crystal River Hatchery	Carbondale, CO	Cold
Durango Fish Hatchery	Durango, CO	Cold
Finger Rock Rearing Unit	Yampa, CO	Cold
Glenwood Springs Hatchery	Glenwood Springs, CO	Cold
John W. Mumma Native Aquatic Species Restoration Facility	Alamosa, CO	Cold
Las Animas Hatchery & Rearing Unit	Las Animas, CO	Warm
Monte Vista Hatchery	Monte Vista, CO	Cold
Mt. Shavano Hatchery	Salida, CO	Cold
Pitkin Hatchery	Pitkin, CO	Cold
Poudre Rearing Unit	Bellvue, CO	Cold
Pueblo Hatchery	Pueblo, CO	Warm and Cold
Rifle Falls Fish Hatchery	Rifle, CO	Cold
Roaring Judy Hatchery	Almont, CO	Cold
Wray Fish Hatchery	Wray, CO	Warm and Cold

== See also ==
- Fish hatchery
- Bibliography of Colorado
- Geography of Colorado
- History of Colorado
- Index of Colorado-related articles
- List of Colorado-related lists
- Outline of Colorado
