= Glenwood Springs Hatchery =

- Location in Colorado Location in United States

General information
- Location: 1362 132 Road, Glenwood Springs, Colorado
- Coordinates: 39.5785928°N 107.3706097°W
- Inaugurated: 1906

The Glenwood Springs Hatchery is a Colorado Parks and Wildlife cold water fish production facility located on Mitchell Creek near the Colorado River in Garfield County, which is 2 miles north of West Glenwood Springs.

== History ==
Glenwood Springs Hatchery was inaugurated in 1906. This hatchery was one operated by the state before 1914. The building was originally large and barn-like framed. An electronic egg-picking machine used to separate live and dead eggs were developed by Neil Van Gaalen, superintendent of Glenwood Springs hatchery, in the 1960s. This technology is utilized at all state-operated hatcheries.

== Fish Species ==
Hatchery staff works to support the raising of rainbow trout, kokanee salmon, and arctic grayling. Annually they stock around 3 million sub-catchable fish for the waters of northwest Colorado. The facility also has broodstocks of rainbow and cutthroat trout. Eggs that are produced are shipped to other state-operated fish hatcheries to be hatched, raised, and stocked at various sizes.
