= Roaring Judy Hatchery =

- Location within Colorado Location within the United States

General information
- Location: Almont, Colorado
- Coordinates: 38.42562°N 106.50496°W
- Inaugurated: 1963

The Roaring Judy Hatchery is a Colorado Parks and Wildlife cold water fish production facility located on East River at the base of Flat Top mountain in Gunnison County. It is home to the largest known kokanee salmon run in the United States.

== History ==
Roaring Judy Hatchery was inaugurated in 1963.

== Mission ==
An overarching mission among the hatchery staff is the preservation of cutthroat trout. In 2016, the facility rescued 158 unique cutthroat trout from Hayden Creek after the Hayden Pass Wildfire. Biologists are working to spawn them to preserve a unique genetic line, and a link to Colorado's fishing history.

== Fish Species ==
Hatchery staff works to support the production of over 3 million kokanee salmon fry, 100,000 subcatchable trout, and 180,000 catchable trout. Their source of water comes from groundwater spring and well water. Salmon are released into the East River through underground pipes. This process is done at night to give high survival odds. After release, salmon come back to the hatchery after approximately three years and ten months. They are able to do so through sensitive odor-detection to locate their birth water. The hatchery staff then strips the eggs and sperm to reproduce the salmon.
