= Pitkin Hatchery =

- Location within Colorado Location within the United States

General information
- Location: 14214 County Rd 76, Pitkin, Colorado
- Coordinates: 38.35561°N 106.31516°W
- Inaugurated: 1914

The Pitkin Hatchery is a Colorado Parks and Wildlife cold water fish production facility located in Gunnison National Forest right off of Quartz Creek Valley in Gunnison County.

== History ==
Pitkin Hatchery was inaugurated in 1914. The land was purchased by Scott Land as a response to cold-water problems, such as limited stock in surrounding waters. The building was constructed in 1906 and built to hold a capacity of one million eggs per year. The elevation spans from 9033 ft - 9446 ft.

== Mission ==
An overarching mission among the hatchery staff is conservation through the production of the Rio Grande cutthroat trout, which is one of Colorado's native fish.

== Fish species ==
The facility focuses on broodstock and production of trout and kokanee salmon. Hatchery staff works to support the raising of 1 million fish annually, including 150,000 catchable rainbow trout. Rio Grande cutthroat trout are also raised as brood fish. Their source of water comes from a groundwater spring.
