= Durango Fish Hatchery =

- Location in Colorado Location in United States

General information
- Location: 151 East 16th Street, Durango, Colorado
- Coordinates: 37.281390°N 107.875261°W
- Inaugurated: 1903

The Durango Fish Hatchery is a Colorado Parks and Wildlife cold water fish production facility located near the Animas River in Durango, Colorado. The hatchery staff raise rainbow, brown, Snake River and native cutthroat trout, and kokanee salmon.

== History ==
The Durango Fish Hatchery was established in 1903. This facility is a duplicate of the original Denver hatchery using a similar construction method consisting of steel and concrete. The facility was originally equipped with culture contrivances. The Durango Fish Hatchery is the oldest state-owned hatchery in Colorado.

== Visiting ==
The hatchery offers a wildlife museum operated by volunteers with fish and animal mounts and hands-on displays. It offers self and volunteer-guided tours, along with a 'Feed the Fish' dispensers. It also offers videos that present hatchery operations.

== Fish Species ==
The hatchery stocks approximately 150,000 catchable rainbow trout and 1.3 million subcatchable fish annually in the southwest corner of Colorado.
