= Poudre Rearing Unit =

- Location in Colorado Location in United States

General information
- Location: 38195 Poudre Canyon, Bellvue, Colorado
- Coordinates: 40.42047°N 105.42376°W
- Inaugurated: 1948

The Poudre Rearing Unit is a Colorado Parks and Wildlife cold water fish production facility located near Cache la Poudre River at the base of South Bald Mountain in Larimer County. It is considered one of the smaller units in Colorado.

== History ==
Poudre Rearing Unit was inaugurated in 1948. The facility is 7,700 ft in elevation.

== Fish species ==
Hatchery staff works to produce millions of broodstock rainbow trout and greenback cutthroat trout eggs. They stock 50,000 trout in public waters on the front range. Their source of water comes from surface water.
