= Alpine, Chaffee County, Colorado =

Unincorporated community in Chaffee County County, Colorado, United States

Alpine, Colorado
- Unincorporated community
- Location of Alpine, Colorado. Alpine (Colorado)
- Coordinates: 38°42′40″N 106°16′37″W
- Country: United States
- State: Colorado
- County: Chaffee

Government
  - Type: unincorporated community
  - Body: Chaffee County
- Elevation: 9,269 ft (2,825 m)
- Time zone: UTC−07:00 (MST)
  - Summer (DST): UTC−06:00 (MDT)
- Area code: 719
- GNIS feature: 203899

Alpine is a small community, sometimes considered a ghost town, in Chaffee County, Colorado, United States. It was founded as a mining town. The Alpine post office operated from October 26, 1874, until June 30, 1904.

== History ==
When the mines played out, the Mary Murphy Mine about four miles from St. Elmo was the last to close in 1910, and both Alpine and St. Elmo became ghost towns. There were still a few residents who continued to live in the two towns, but the towns were nearly empty for half a century. Then in the 1950s and 1960s people rediscovered the quiet beauty of Chalk Creek gulch and built summer homes. Some of the salvageable buildings in Alpine and St. Elmo were fixed up and still stand.

The San Isabel National Forest completely surrounds Alpine and St. Elmo and prevents more extensive development. St. Elmo remains a local tourist attraction as a ghost town with a part-time general store and some year-round residents. Alpine is more residential and has no tourist interest. Alpine has about 10 families who live there year-round, and a summer population of several hundred.

== Geography ==
Alpine is located in Chaffee County at an elevation 9,269 feet (2,825 m).

== See also ==
- List of ghost towns in Colorado
