= Wray Fish Hatchery =

- Location in Colorado Location in United States

General information
- Location: 35677 Road FF, Wray, Colorado
- Coordinates: 40.05084°N 102.15570°W
- Inaugurated: 1939

Website
- https://www.colorado.com/wildlife-viewingrefuges/wray-fish-hatchery

The Wray Fish Hatchery is a Colorado Parks and Wildlife warm and cold water fish production facility located near Chief Creek and Stalker Lake in Yuma County.

== History ==
Wray Fish Hatchery was inaugurated in 1939. In 2012, the facility began using Longmont's Burch Lake to breed muskellunge which was a step in obtaining a tiger muskie population in Colorado. Before deposition, the females were crossed with northern pike.

== Fish Species ==
Hatchery staff works to support the raising of broodstock black crappie, bluegill, and redear sunfish; other species, including walleye, saugeye, channel catfish, wiper, tiger muskie, and grass carp originate at other Colorado warm water lakes and hatcheries, or are traded from out-of-state.
