= Bellvue-Watson Fish Hatchery =

- Location within Colorado Bellvue-Watson Fish Hatchery (the United States)

General information
- Location: 4936 West CR 52E, Bellvue, Colorado
- Coordinates: 40°37′57.3″N 105°10′10.68″W
- Inaugurated: 1914

The Bellvue-Watson Fish Hatchery is a Colorado Parks and Wildlife cold water fish production facility located near Cache la Poudre River and Watson Lake State Wildlife Area in Larimer County, Colorado. Hatchery staff works to support the raising of approximately 1.5 million sub-catchable trout annually. The Watson Lake Rearing Unit, a division within the hatchery, is responsible for rearing approximately 300,000 catchable trout each year. The hatchery stocks fishing sports in Wellington, Fort Collins, Loveland, Longmont and Jumbo Reservoir near Julesburg and Hale ponds.

This hatchery also contains Colorado's Fish Research Hatchery, which first began operation in 1968. The staff is responsible for the improvement of hatchery techniques and aquaculture advancement. Methods include conducting feed and fish strain performance evaluations and work to improve both rearing survival and post-stocking survival of hatchery fish. Various areas of study include whirling disease resistant strain research, broodstock, and optimization of production.

== History ==
Bellvue-Watson was inaugurated in 1914 and its building was completed in 1924. The fish research hatchery followed these establishments in 1968. In September 2013 a flood devastated the hatchery, forcing it to close. After several years of repairs, the hatchery was able to reopen in 2017

== Mission ==
Hatchery staff provide public education. The facilities provide fish for stocking in various areas for angling recreation. The facility offers educational materials and tours. The aquatic research facility conducts research on hatchery techniques.

== Fish Species ==
The Bellvue-Watson hatchery raises catchable rainbow trout, cutthroat trout, splake, brown trout and rainbow/cutthroat trout hybrids. The aquatic research facility produces native cutthroat trout as well as strains of rainbow trout that are resistant to whirling disease.
