= Flattop Mountain =

Flattop Mountain and Flat Top Mountain may refer to

- in the United States:

Name	State	County	Coordinates	USGS 7.5' Map	GNIS ID
Flattop Mountain (Anchorage, Alaska)	AK	Municipality of Anchorage	61°05′26″N 149°39′55″W	Anchorage A-8 SE	1402210
Flat Top Mountain (Sitka City and Borough, Alaska)	AK	City and Borough of Sitka	57°37′03″N 136°00′04″W	Sitka C-7	1421971
Flattop Mountain	AR	Logan	35°13′00″N 093°37′23″W	Magazine Mountain NE	71631
Flattops, The	AZ	Apache	34°49′54″N 109°49′17″W	Agate House	12318
Flattop	AZ	Mohave	34°47′29″N 114°01′49″W	Yucca SE	4679
Flattop Hill	AZ	Navajo	34°40′00″N 110°09′34″W	Flattop Hill	4680
Flattop	CA	Kings	35°55′42″N 120°09′15″W	Garza Peak	242297
Flat Top Mountain	CA	Riverside	33°51′58″N 116°28′04″W	Flat Top Mountain	1656519
Flattop Mountain	CA	San Bernardino	34°49′52″N 114°49′36″W	Flattop Mountain	242298
Flattop Mountain	CO	Archuleta	37°12′18″N 106°43′43″W	Elephant Head Rock	191054
Flattop Mountain	CO	Dolores	37°44′45″N 107°56′52″W	Hermosa Peak	203307
Flattop Mountain	CO	Dolores	37°47′30″N 108°19′04″W	Groundhog Reservoir	176545
Flat Top Mountain (Colorado)	CO	Garfield	40°00′03″N 107°04′58″W	Orno Peak	173561
Flattop Mountain	CO	Grand	40°18′33″N 105°41′24″W	McHenrys Peak	204966
Flat Top	CO	Gunnison	38°42′34″N 106°54′34″W	Flat Top	188924
Flattop Butte	CO	Las Animas	37°33′06″N 104°20′29″W	Hidden Valley Ranch	194997
Flattop Mountain	CO	Routt	40°48′26″N 106°38′06″W	Mount Zirkel	170414
Flattop Mountain	CO	Routt	40°59′16″N 107°12′54″W	Tumble Mountain	169846
Flat Top Mountain (Georgia)	GA	Gilmer	34°51′05″N 84°29′51″W		355835
Flattop	ID	Bonner	48°28′01″N 116°41′03″W	Mount Casey	397709
Flattop Butte	ID	Owyhee	43°14′17″N 116°56′29″W	Captain Butte	372732
Flattop Mountain	ID	Shoshone	47°14′47″N 115°19′23″W	Berge Peak	381851
Flattop Mountain	MT	Flathead	48°48′07″N 113°51′57″W	Ahern Pass	771459
East Flattop Mountain	MT	Glacier	48°44′22″N 113°31′13″W	Rising Sun	771007
Flattop Mountain	MT	Madison	45°11′42″N 111°23′10″W	Sphinx Mountain	783528
Flattop Mountain	MT	Mineral	47°14′41″N 115°19′23″W	Berge Peak	807054
Flattop Mountain	MT	Pondera	48°17′43″N 113°19′45″W	Summit	783529
Flat Top Mountain (Montana)	MT	Sanders	48°01′48″N 115°3′56″W	Howard Lake	783508
Flattop Mountain (North Carolina)	NC	Avery	36°06′54″N 081°51′43″W	Grandfather Mountain	1020283
Flat Mountain	NC	Jackson	35°02′10″N 083°02′55″W	Cashiers	1020272
Flat Top Mountain	NC	Watauga	36°09′45″N 081°40′37″W	Boone	1011267
Flattop	NC	Yancey	36°02′54″N 082°24′31″W	Chestoa	1011270
Flattop	NE	Cherry	42°58′19″N 100°17′42″W	Sparks	829326
Flattop Mesa	NM	Cibola	34°35′59″N 108°34′37″W	Cerro Prieto	889089
Flattop Mountain	NV	Esmeralda	37°45′04″N 117°20′02″W	Alkali	845832
Flattop Peak	OK	Love	33°54′06″N 097°05′12″W	Marietta East	1092892
Flat Top Butte	SD	Harding	45°23′45″N 103°03′20″W	Flat Top Butte	1255082
Flattop Butte	SD	Pennington	43°51′40″N 103°04′30″W	Hermosa SE	1255084
Flattop	TN	Unicoi	36°07′44″N 082°33′11″W	Telford	1284448
Flattop	TN	Washington	36°07′45″N 082°33′11″W	Telford	1641348
Flattop	TX	Callahan	32°30′36″N 099°31′01″W	Flattop	1335942
Flattop Mountain	TX	Howard	32°26′42″N 101°15′54″W	Big Spring North NE	1335943
Flattop Mountain	TX	Hudspeth	31°38′58″N 105°02′40″W	Salt Flat	1357468
Flattop Mountain	TX	Jeff Davis	30°48′36″N 104°11′26″W	Robbers Roost Canyon	1357467
Flattop Butte	UT	Duchesne	40°13′21″N 110°06′15″W	Myton	1428007
Flattop Mountain	UT	Emery	39°19′36″N 110°34′55″W	Flattop Mountain	1428008
Flat Top Mountain (Utah)	UT	Tooele	40°22′21″N 112°11′21″W	Flat Top Mountain	1428004
Flattop	VA	Botetourt	37°24′31″N 079°50′41″W	Villamont	1483450
Flat Top	VA	Grayson	36°42′06″N 081°32′40″W	Whitetop Mountain	1499422
Flattop Mountain	VA	Greene	38°17′37″N 078°36′19″W	Swift Run Gap	1499423
Flattop Mountain	VA	Rockingham	38°50′22″N 078°58′04″W	Bergton	1488494
Flattop Mountain	VA	Smyth	36°56′18″N 081°45′57″W	Saltville	1487043
Flat Top Hill	WA	Benton	46°17′59″N 119°21′18″W	Richland	1513366
Flattop Mountain	WA	Skamania	46°01′42″N 121°36′46″W	Trout Lake	1519646
Flat Top Mountain	WV	Raleigh			
Flattop Mountain	WV	Hardy	38°50′51″N 078°57′49″W	Bergton	1554470
Flat Top Mountain	WV	Monroe	37°40′48″N 080°34′43″W	Fort Spring	1539063
Flattop Mountain	WY	Albany	42°20′01″N 105°38′53″W	Toltec	1599761
Flat Top Mountain	WY	Carbon	41°11′32″N 107°50′28″W	Flat Top Mountain	1588574
Flattop Mountain	WY	Carbon	41°58′52″N 106°10′47″W	Medicine Bow	1588580
Flattop	WY	Laramie	41°28′16″N 104°16′04″W	Round Top	1588577
Flattop Butte	WY	Niobrara	42°36′51″N 104°30′05″W	Rawhide Buttes West	1588578
Little Flattop Mountain	WY	Sublette	43°04′29″N 109°55′45″W	New Fork Lakes	1600978
Flattop Mountain	WY	Sweetwater	41°22′54″N 109°22′12″W	Wilkins Peak	1599762
