= Mt. Shavano Hatchery =

- Location in Colorado Location in United States

General information
- Location: 7725 CR 154, Salida, Colorado
- Coordinates: 38°32′41.94″N 106°1′11.35″W
- Inaugurated: 1956

Website
- https://www.facebook.com/MtShavanoHatchery/

The Mt. Shavano Hatchery is a Colorado Parks and Wildlife cold-water fish hatchery situated near Arkansas River headwaters at the base of Big Baldy Mountain in Chaffee County. This facility is renowned as one of the largest trout units in the state.

== History ==
Mt. Shavano Hatchery, inaugurated in 1956, had its origins as a privately owned facility. Originally, it consisted of a frame building housing 10 pools, utilizing springs that provided a flow of approximately 200 gallons per minute. However, due to a decline in the water table, the owner ceased fish farming operations. It is speculated that the original hatchery was Frantzhurst Rainbow Trout Company, situated along Fountain Creek. Subsequently, in 1956, the state acquired this facility and renamed it Mount Shavano Hatchery and Rearing Unit.

== Fish species ==
Hatchery staff works to support the raising of 420,000 Whirling Disease negative catchable trout and about 2.6 million subcatchable trout and kokanee salmon annually. The species raised at the unit include Rainbow trout, Snake River cutthroat, cutthroat/rainbow crosses (cutbow), and kokanee salmon. These fish are nurtured using water sourced from a groundwater spring.
