= John W. Mumma Native Aquatic Species Restoration Facility =

- Location in Colorado Location in United States

General information
- Location: 6655 South County Rd 106, Alamosa, Colorado
- Coordinates: 37.4694°N 105.8700°W
- Inaugurated: 2000

The John W. Mumma Native Aquatic Species Restoration Facility is a Colorado Parks and Wildlife cold water fish production facility located near Playa Blanca State Wildlife Area and the Rio Grande in Alamosa County.

== History ==
John W. Mumma Native Aquatic Species Restoration Facility was inaugurated in 2000. Construction of the facility was funded by Great Outdoors Colorado, the Department of Natural Resources' Water Conservation Board, and the Colorado Division of Wildlife. The hatchery is the first state facility nationwide built exclusively for native species.

== Mission ==
An overarching mission among the hatchery staff is conservation of rare aquatic native species. The facility focuses on captive propagation, genetic conservation, scientific research and public education and awareness.

== Fish Species ==
Hatchery staff works to rear 12 species of fish and one amphibian. The species they work with include bonytail chub (Federal and State Endangered), Rio Grande sucker (State Endangered), plains minnow (State Endangered), suckermouth minnow (State Endangered), Northern redbelly dace (State Endangered), southern redbelly dace (State Endangered), Arkansas darter (State Threatened), common shiner (State Threatened), Rio Grande chub (Species of Special Concern), roundtail chub (Species of Special Concern), bluehead sucker (No official state status at this time), flannelmouth sucker (No official state status at this time) and boreal toad (State Endangered). They work to maintain water quality, photoperiod, dietary needs, and appropriate spawning and habitat requirements for each species.
