= Lake Pueblo State Park =

State park in Colorado, United States

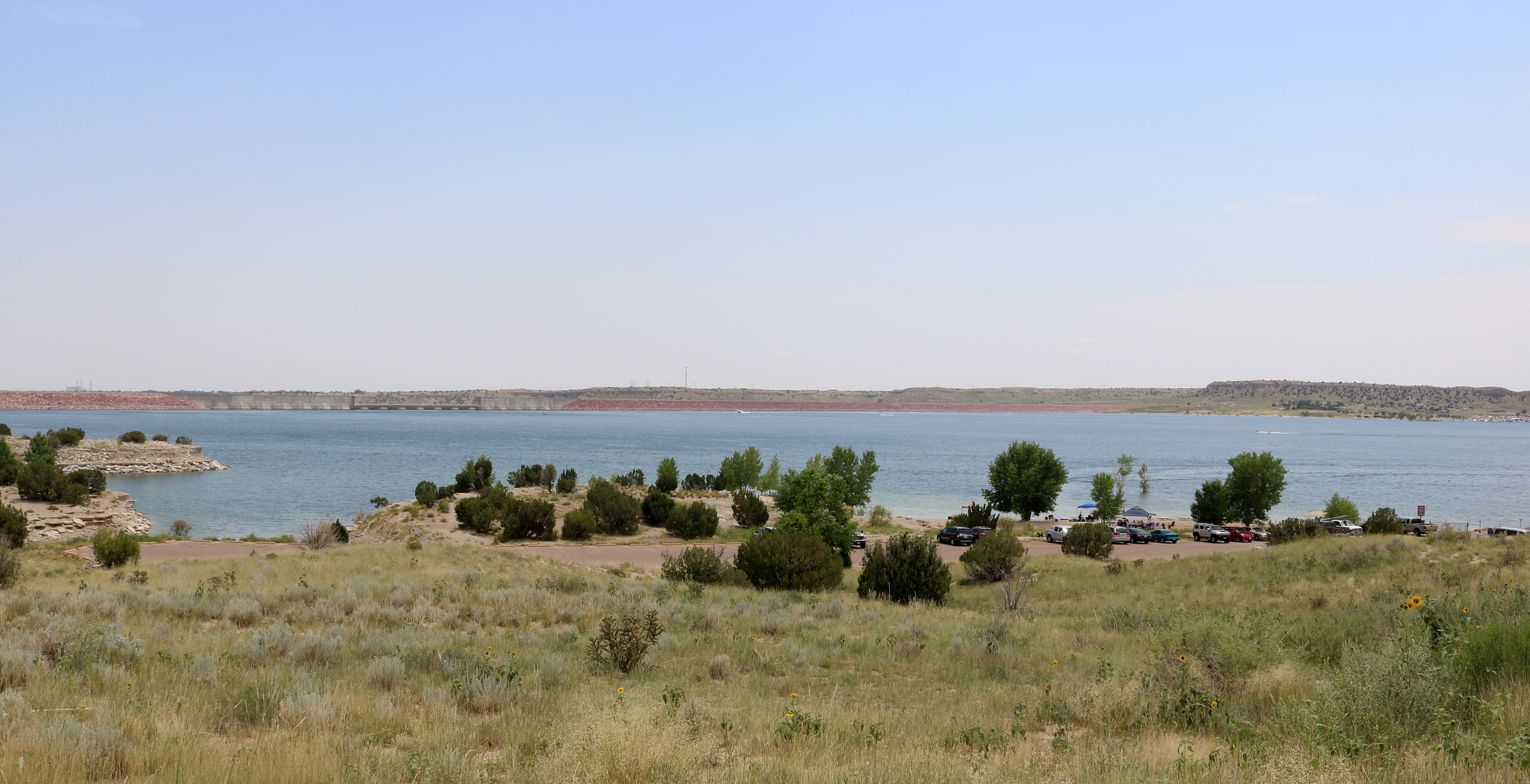
- Lake Pueblo and the dam.

- Location within Colorado
- Location: Pueblo County, Colorado, U.S.
- Nearest city: Pueblo
- Coordinates: 38.2547°N 104.7323°W
- Area: 10,279 acres (41.60 km^{2})
- Established: 1975
- Visitors: 5,112,753 (in 2021)
- Governing body: Colorado Parks and Wildlife

Lake Pueblo State Park is a state park located in Pueblo County, Colorado. It includes 60 miles (97 km) of shoreline and 10,000 acres (40 km^{2}) of land. Activities it offers include two full-service marinas, recreational fishing, hiking, camping and swimming at a special swim beach.

== Lake Pueblo ==
Lake Pueblo (also known as Pueblo Reservoir) has a maximum depth of 135 feet (41 m) and is impounded by Pueblo Dam. Its surface elevation is 4,826 feet (1,471 meters).

Lake Pueblo is host to many water recreation activities including sailing, motor-boating, waterskiing, wakeboarding, wakesurfing, river tubing and prime fishing.

== History ==
Pueblo Dam was constructed from 1970–1975 across the Arkansas River in Pueblo County as part of the Bureau of Reclamation's Fryingpan-Arkansas Project. While the primary purpose of the reservoir is to provide supplemental water for agricultural, municipal, and industrial uses, water from Pueblo also helps enhance recreation, fish and wildlife. Additionally, and unlike most reservoirs Reclamation constructed in Colorado, the Pueblo Dam provides for flood control because the Arkansas River has a history of flooding roughly every ten years, the most notable of which was in 1921.

The dam, NID ID CO00299, is a buttress concrete structure completed in 1975. It is 250 feet (76 meters) tall and 10,230 feet (3,120 meters) long. It can store as much as 489,116 acre-feet (603,316,000 cubic meters) of water and has a surface area of 5,671 acres (2,295 hectares).

=== Hydroelectric power plant ===
The dam was retrofitted with a 7.5 megawatt hydroelectric power plant in 2019. Called the James W. Broderick Hydropower Plant, it has three turbines and two generators and does not consume any water.

== Wildlife ==
The land surrounding the reservoir is very diverse. Mammals commonly sited or observed at the park include mule deer, coyote, cottontail rabbit, red fox, gray fox, beaver, raccoon, skunk, prairie dogs, and badger. It also plays home to many different reptile species bull snakes, rattlesnakes, sagebrush lizards, coach whips, and box turtles. It is notable in that it also home to a rare species of serpent, the blackneck garter snake.

== Fishing ==
Fish here include smallmouth bass, largemouth bass, spotted bass, walleye, crappie, bluegill, wiper, channel catfish, flathead catfish, blue catfish, rainbow trout, common carp, gizzard shad, and white suckers. Lake Pueblo State Park is also home to the Pueblo Hatchery, managed by the Colorado Department of Parks and Wildlife.

== See also ==
- State of Colorado
  - Colorado Department of Natural Resources
    - Colorado State Parks
      - List of Colorado state parks
- List of lakes in Colorado
- List of largest reservoirs of Colorado
  - List of dams and reservoirs in Colorado
