= Finger Rock Rearing Unit =

- Location in Colorado Location in United States

General information
- Location: 27750 County Road 7C, Yampa, Colorado
- Coordinates: 40.1258176°N 106.8906018°W
- Inaugurated: 1950

The Finger Rock Rearing Unit is a Colorado Parks and Wildlife cold water fish production facility located near Bear River in Routt County at the base of Flat Tops Wilderness Area.

== History ==
Finger Rock Rearing Unit was inaugurated in 1950. The facility is 34 acres and spanning 7,999 ft - 8,219 ft in elevation and is between two cattle ranches off Colorado Highway 131 south of Yampa.

== Fish Species ==
Hatchery staff works to support the raising of 460,000 fingerling rainbow trout and brown trout, and 170,000 catchable-sized rainbow trout. They stock these species in as far north as Steamboat Lake to Poudre River Valley in northwestern Colorado. The fish are kept in hatchery and nursery ponds. Between these two areas, they hold approximately 650,000 fish. Their source of water comes from a groundwater spring.
