= Chalk Cliffs Rearing Unit =

Fish production facility in Colorado, US

- Location in Colorado Location in United States

General information
- Location: 22605 CR 287, Nathrop, Colorado
- Coordinates: 38.712194°N 106.235361°W
- Inaugurated: 1950

The Chalk Cliffs Rearing Unit is a Colorado Parks and Wildlife cold water fish production facility located near Arkansas River and Chalk Creek in Chaffee County, Colorado. Hatchery staff works to support the raising of approximately 700,000 catchable, ten-inch rainbow trout annually. The hatchery stocks fish along the Front Range from Loveland to the New Mexico border, and east almost to the Kansas border.

== History ==
Chalk Cliffs was inaugurated in 1950.

In 1986, the facility experienced a widespread death among fingerling trout. This was thought to be a result of using creek water. Water quality sampling by the Department of Public Health and the Environment found that the cause was high amounts of zinc and cadmium, from the Mary Murphy Mine upstream. In 1990, Chalk Creek was chosen for cleanup through the Division of Minerals and Geology. This was necessary as the levels were impacting fish habitats and water quality degradation in the Arkansas River. Yet, their clean up attempts were unsuccessful.

== Mission ==
An overarching mission among the hatchery staff is educating the public. The facilities provide fish for stock in many areas which supports angling recreation. The facility offers educational materials and tours.

== Fish species ==
The Chalk Cliffs Rearing Unit raises catchable rainbow trout, cutthroat trout. They obtain their water source from a nearby creek.
