= Crystal River Hatchery =

- Location in Colorado Location in United States

General information
- Location: 2957 Highway 133, Carbondale, Colorado
- Coordinates: 38.3781°N 107.2038°W
- Inaugurated: 1943

The Crystal River Hatchery is a Colorado Parks and Wildlife cold-water fish production facility located along the Crystal River in Garfield County, Colorado, near Carbondale. The hatchery raises rainbow trout and Snake River cutthroat trout brood fish. The millions of eggs from these brood fish are shipped to other hatcheries to be raised for stocking.

== Visiting ==
The Crystal River Hatchery is open to the public. It offers self-guided tours. Nearby, on the east side of the Crystal River, there is a fishing area open to the public.
