= Pueblo Hatchery =

- Location in Colorado Location in United States

General information
- Location: 500 Pueblo Reservoir Road, Pueblo, Colorado
- Coordinates: 38.15481°N 104.43247°W

The Pueblo Hatchery is the only Colorado Parks and Wildlife cold and warm water fish production facility located in Lake Pueblo State Park near Arkansas River in Pueblo County.

== History ==
Pueblo Hatchery was built by the United States Bureau of Reclamation, but Colorado Parks and Wildlife is responsible for maintenance and operation.

== Fish Species ==
Hatchery staff works to support the raising of fry, fingerlings, and catchables of rainbow trout. The hatchery raises crappie, bluegills, largemouth bass, brown trout, saugeye, wiper and walleye. Their source of water comes from surface water.
