= Chalk Creek =

River in Colorado, United States

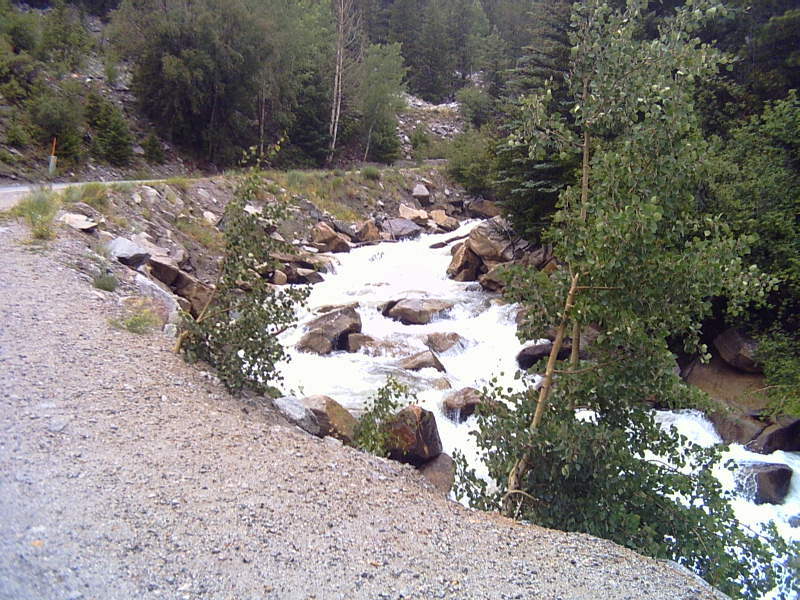
- Chalk Creek west of US-285 to St.Elmo

Physical characteristics
- Source
  - coordinates: 38°36′20″N 106°21′32″W
- Mouth
  - location: Confluence with Arkansas
  - coordinates: 38°44′27″N 106°04′00″W
  - elevation: 7,602 ft (2,317 m)

Basin features
- Progression: Arkansas—Mississippi

Chalk Creek is a 27.3-mile-long (43.9 km) river flowing east from the Collegiate Peaks mountain range in Chaffee County, Colorado. Mount Antero borders the southern side of the river, while Mount Princeton borders the northern side. The headwaters of the river are located at the Continental Divide. The river empties into the Arkansas River at the town of Nathrop, Colorado.

The river is named after the white kaolinite cliffs that stand at the entrance to the Chalk Creek valley, and are a result of hot spring deposits. These white cliffs are visible for miles in all directions, and stand in stark contrast to the otherwise wooded surrounding mountains. Stands of aspen trees and evergreens of various species surround the river for its entire length.

The river is surrounded by a mix of privately owned and US forest service land. Campgrounds and public trails, including the Colorado Trail, are located along the length of the river. Several hot springs emerge in this valley.

== History ==
The river has a history tied to the gold and silver rush in Colorado in the 1800s. Along the river, several towns sprouted along with the influx of gold prospectors. St. Elmo, Hancock, and Alpine are towns that were founded and flourished with the gold rush. The Mary Murphy Mine, one of the most productive mineral mines in Colorado, is located in Chalk Creek canyon.

The Denver, South Park and Pacific Railroad had a rail route that wound up Chalk Creek canyon into the Alpine Tunnel. The tunnel was built to allow trains to transport ore and supplies to and from the town of Gunnison, Colorado, located on the western side of the Continental Divide. The rail route was closed once the gold rush declined, and the Alpine Tunnel has since been sealed to prevent injury.

With the decline of the gold rush in the late 19th and early 20th centuries, the towns in Chalk Creek canyon withered and became ghost towns. St. Elmo, listed on the National Register of Historic Places, has been transformed into a tourist destination and has several intact historic buildings.

== Fishing and camping ==
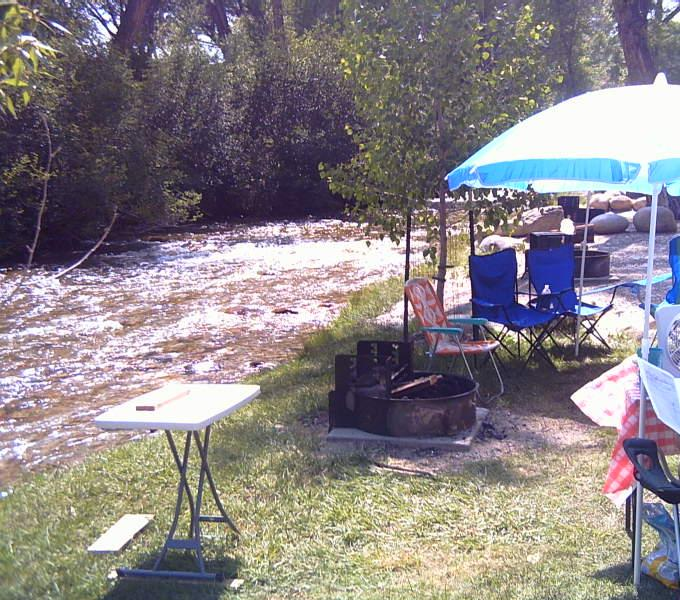
Camping along Chalk Creek near Nathrop, CO

Chalk Creek provides habitat to several species of fish, including Brook Trout, Brown Trout, Cutthroat Trout, and Rainbow Trout. Camping is available at local commercial campgrounds and public National Forest campgrounds.

== See also ==
- List of rivers of Colorado
