= Mary Murphy Mine =

Gold mine in Colorado, United States

Coordinates: 38°40′05″N 106°20′58″W

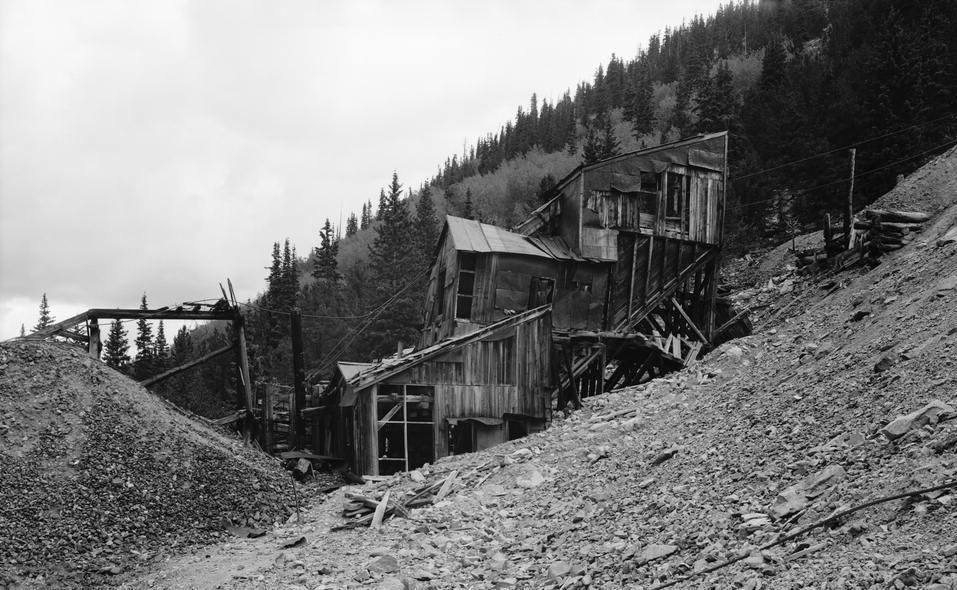
Tramhouse, Mary Murphy Mine, 1984

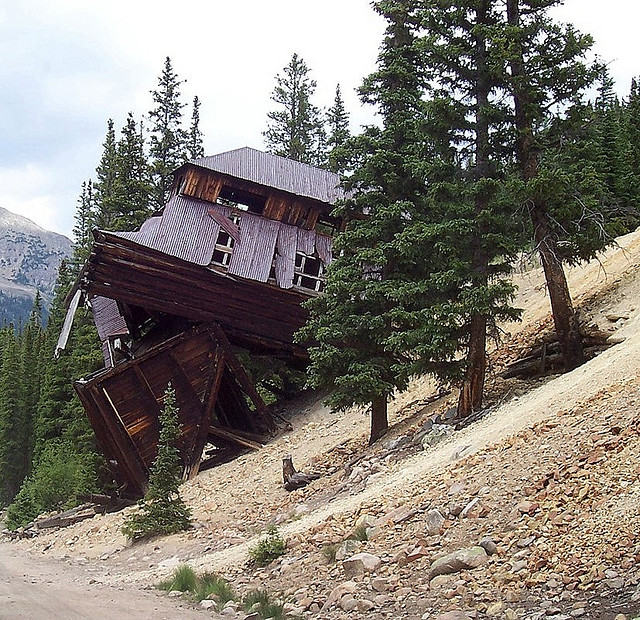
Lower terminal at Romley, old tram from the Alley Belle mine. Ore was loaded onto railcars here.

The Mary Murphy Mine was the principal gold mine of the Chalk Creek mining district of Chaffee County, Colorado, United States, near St. Elmo, Colorado. The Mary Murphy Mine operated continuously from 1870 to 1925, and produced 220 thousand ounces of gold, worth $4.4 million then (or about $256,683,000 in 2023), plus considerable silver, lead, and zinc. There were two aerial tramways connecting the mine to Romley, Colorado, and the Denver, South Park and Pacific Railroad.

In 1984 the Historic American Engineering Record recorded the structures then standing in the area.

Drainage from the old mine into Chalk Creek, a tributary of the Upper Arkansas River, would sometimes cause fish kills at Chalk Cliffs Rearing Unit, the state-run fish hatchery downstream, such as the kill of 800,000 fingerling trout in 1986. The Colorado Department of Natural Resources consolidated all of the surface wastes and capped them in a “high-and-dry” spot on the mill site. This reduced the dissolved metals levels enough to keep the fish kills from recurring. Since then, the site has been used as test-bed for new ways to treat harmful drainage from abandoned mines in the Colorado Rockies.

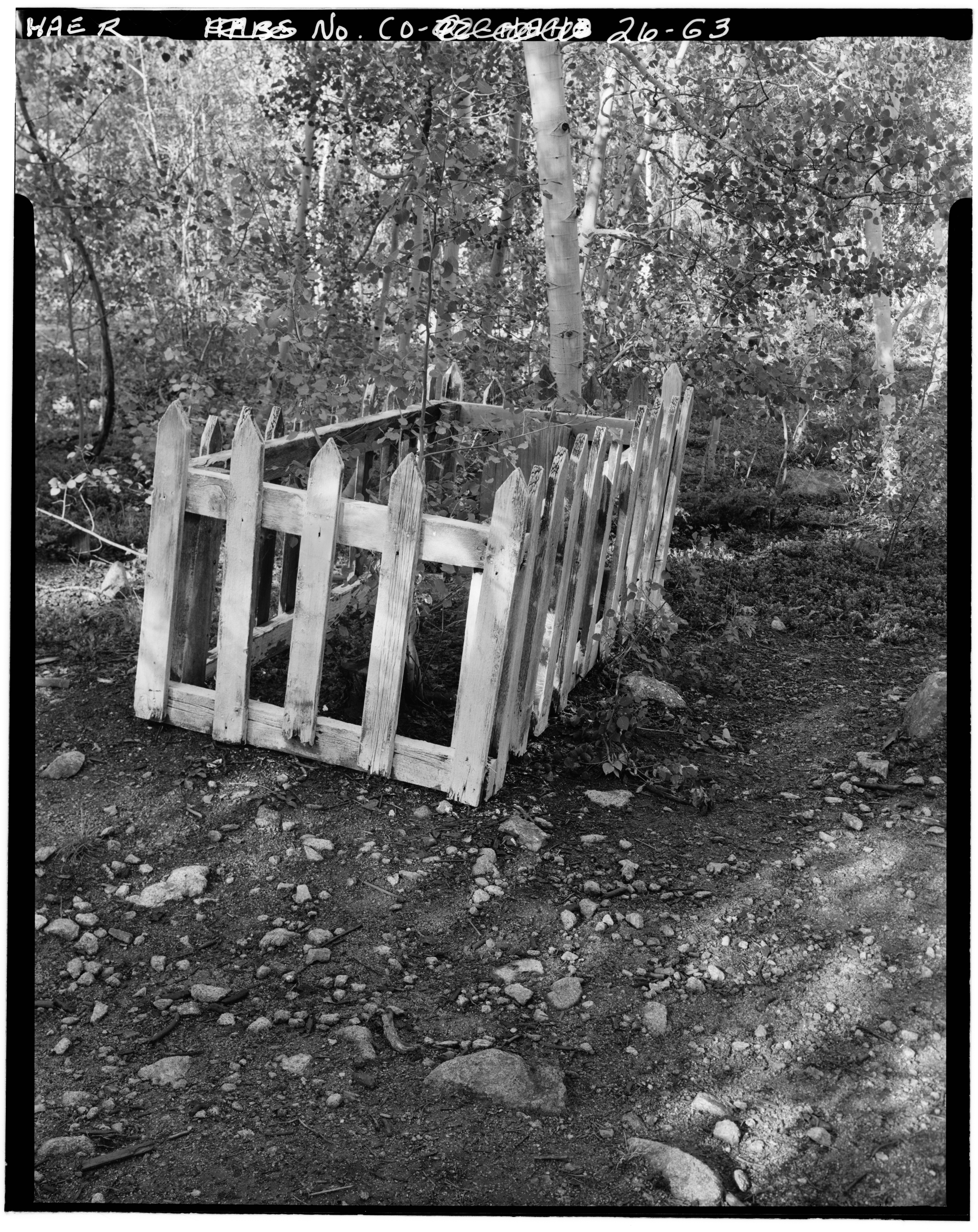
Iron City Cemetery: grave site with wooden headstone. Photo ca. 1984

The Mary Murphy Mine is a popular destination for four-wheelers and ghost-town enthusiasts. Also nearby are the remains of Iron City, a short-lived smelter town and a nearby cemetery.

== See also ==
- Saint Elmo, Colorado
- Chalk Creek
