= Flat Top Mountain (Georgia) =

Mountain in Georgia, United States

Coordinates: 34°51′05″N 84°29′51″W

Flat Top Mountain is a summit in the U.S. state of Georgia. The elevation is 3,589 feet (1,094 m).

Flat Top Mountain was descriptively named on account of its flat peak.
