= Saint Elmo, Colorado =

- Saint Elmo Historic District
- U.S. National Register of Historic Places
- U.S. Historic district
- Colorado State Register of Historic Properties
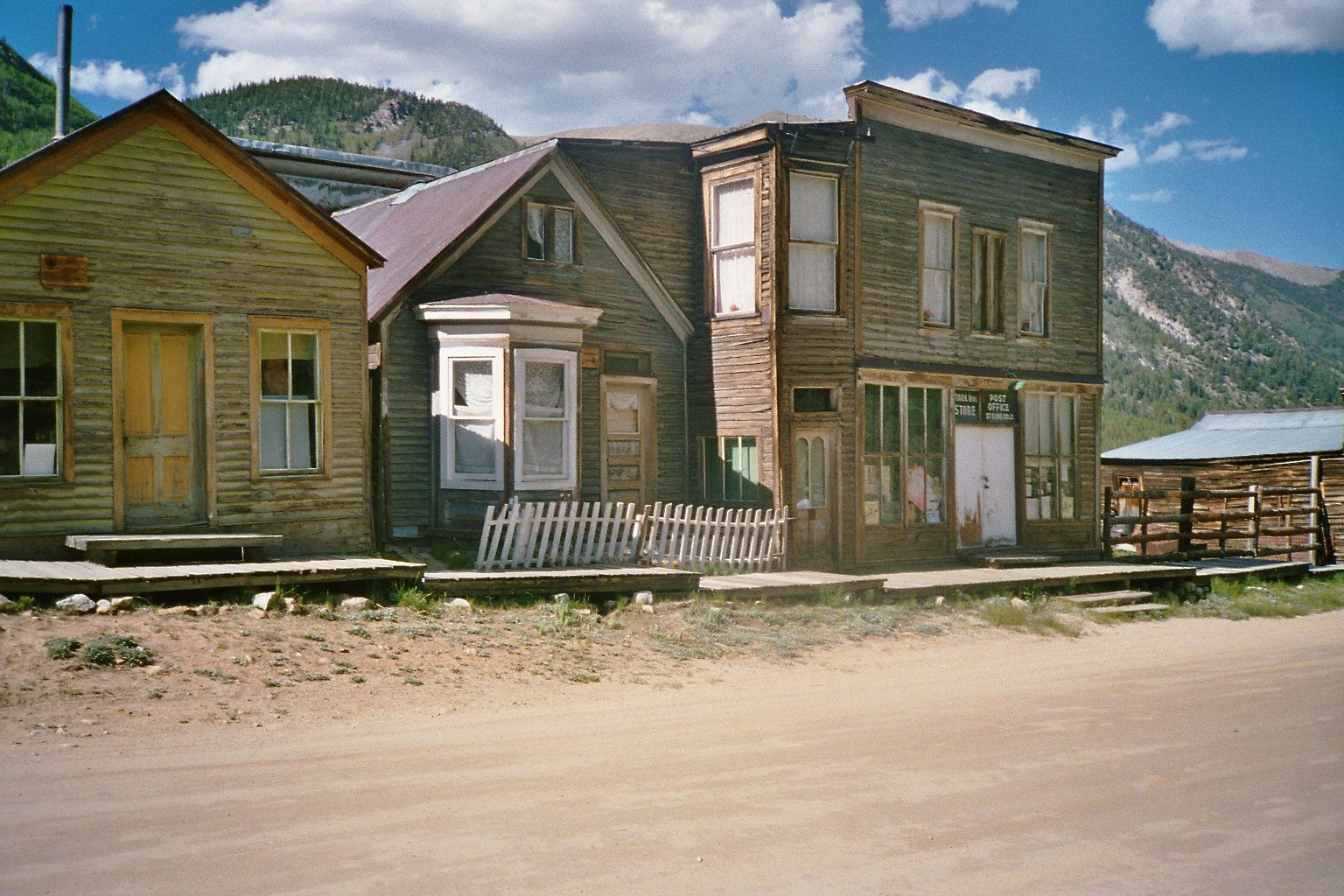
- Buildings along Main Street

- Location within Colorado Location within the United States
- Location: Pitkin, Gunnison, 1st., Main and Poplar Sts., Saint Elmo, Colorado
- Coordinates: 38°42′17″N 106°20′42″W
- Area: 70 acres (28 ha)
- NRHP reference No.: 79000577
- CSRHP No.: 5CF.139
- Added to NRHP: September 17, 1979

Saint Elmo is a ghost town in Chaffee County, Colorado, United States. Founded in 1880, Saint Elmo lies in the heart of the Sawatch Range, 20 miles (32 km) southwest of Buena Vista and sits at an elevation of 9,961 feet (3,036 m). Nearly 2,000 people settled in this town when mining for gold and silver started. The mining industry started to decline in the early 1920s, and in 1922 the railroad discontinued service. The community is listed on the National Register of Historic Places as the Saint Elmo Historic District. It is one of Colorado's best preserved ghost towns.

== History ==
Saint Elmo was originally named Forest City but was later changed because of the multitude of towns with the same name. The name Saint Elmo was chosen by Griffith Evans, one of the founding fathers, who was reading a novel with the same title.

The town was at its peak in the 1890s, when it included a telegraph office, general store, town hall, five hotels, saloons, dancing halls, a newspaper office, and a school house. The town's first and longest running newspaper, the St. Elmo Mountaineer, began reporting on the town's mining activities in August 1880 and ran until 1895. The Denver, South Park and Pacific Railroad line ran through Saint Elmo. There were 150 patented mine claims within the area. The majority of the people who lived in Saint Elmo worked at the Mary Murphy, Teresa C., The Molly or the Pioneer Mines. The Mary Murphy Mine was the largest and most successful mine in the area. The Mary Murphy Mine recovered over $60,000,000 worth of gold while it was in operation. While the other mines eventually shut down, the Mary Murphy Mine continued to operate until the railroad was abandoned in 1922.

Once the mining industry shut down, Saint Elmo drastically declined in population. Miners searched elsewhere for gold and silver and the business district in Saint Elmo closed down as well. Few people continued to live in the town. Postal service was discontinued in 1952 after the death of Saint Elmo's postmaster.

In 1979, Saint Elmo was designated as a National Historic District.

== Saint Elmo today ==
Saint Elmo is considered a ghost town, though it is still inhabited. Many tourists visit Saint Elmo, and the former mining roads are now used as off-road vehicle trails. There are places to fish along Chalk Creek, which runs through Saint Elmo, but the creek is all private property. There is a campground next door (Iron City Campground) that has public access in a few spots if you are looking to fish. The general store is open during the summer, when tourists can rent off-road vehicles or buy items. Many buildings are extant, though the town hall and a few other buildings were destroyed by fire in 2002. In 2008, Buena Vista Heritage rebuilt the town hall to its original state.

Due to many break-ins and vandalisms, though there are few inhabitants of St. Elmo, Colorado, they are fiercely protective of the history and their neighborhood, and request that any and all visitors treat the town with consideration and respect.

== Gallery ==
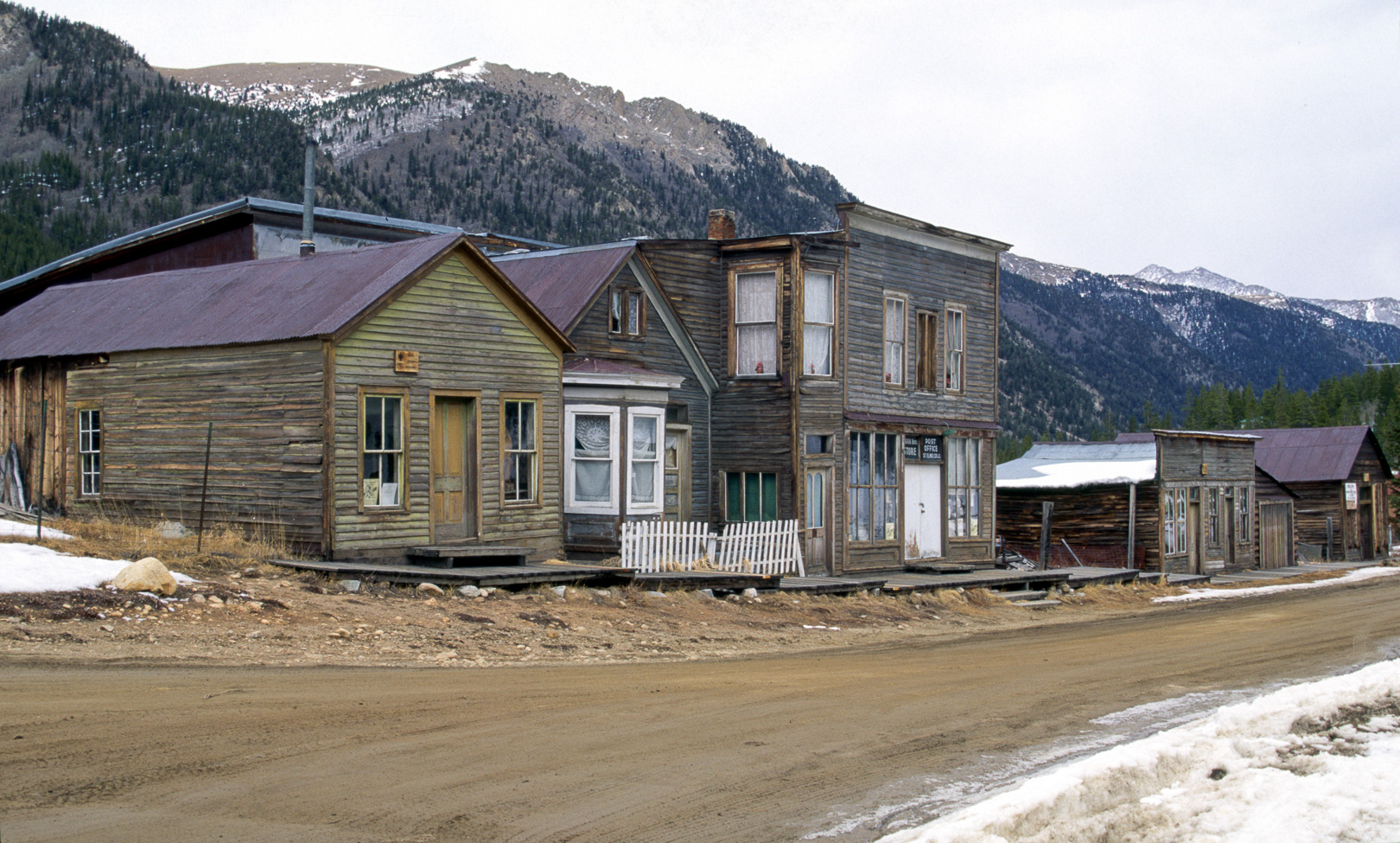
Saint Elmo

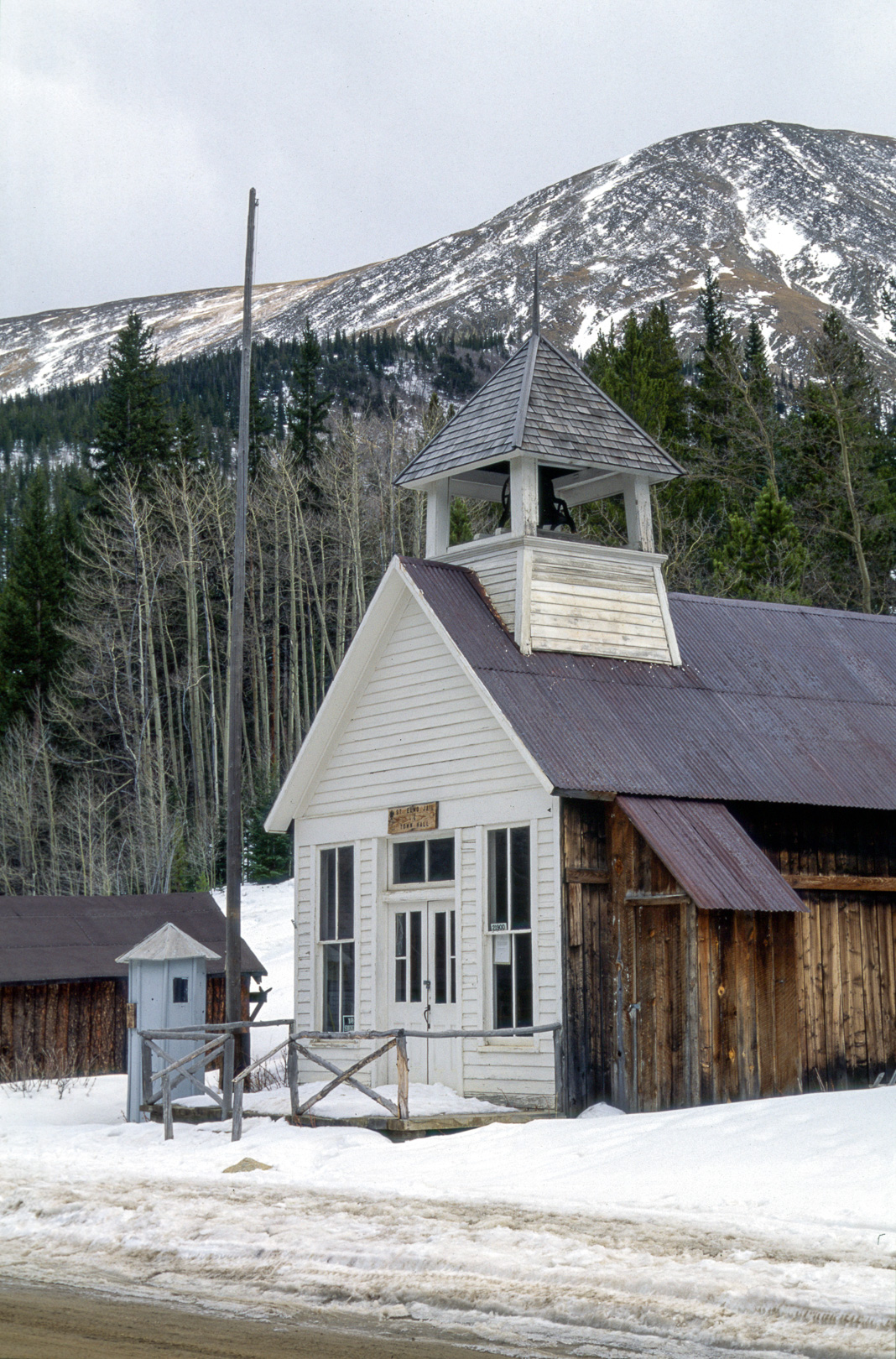
The town hall and jail

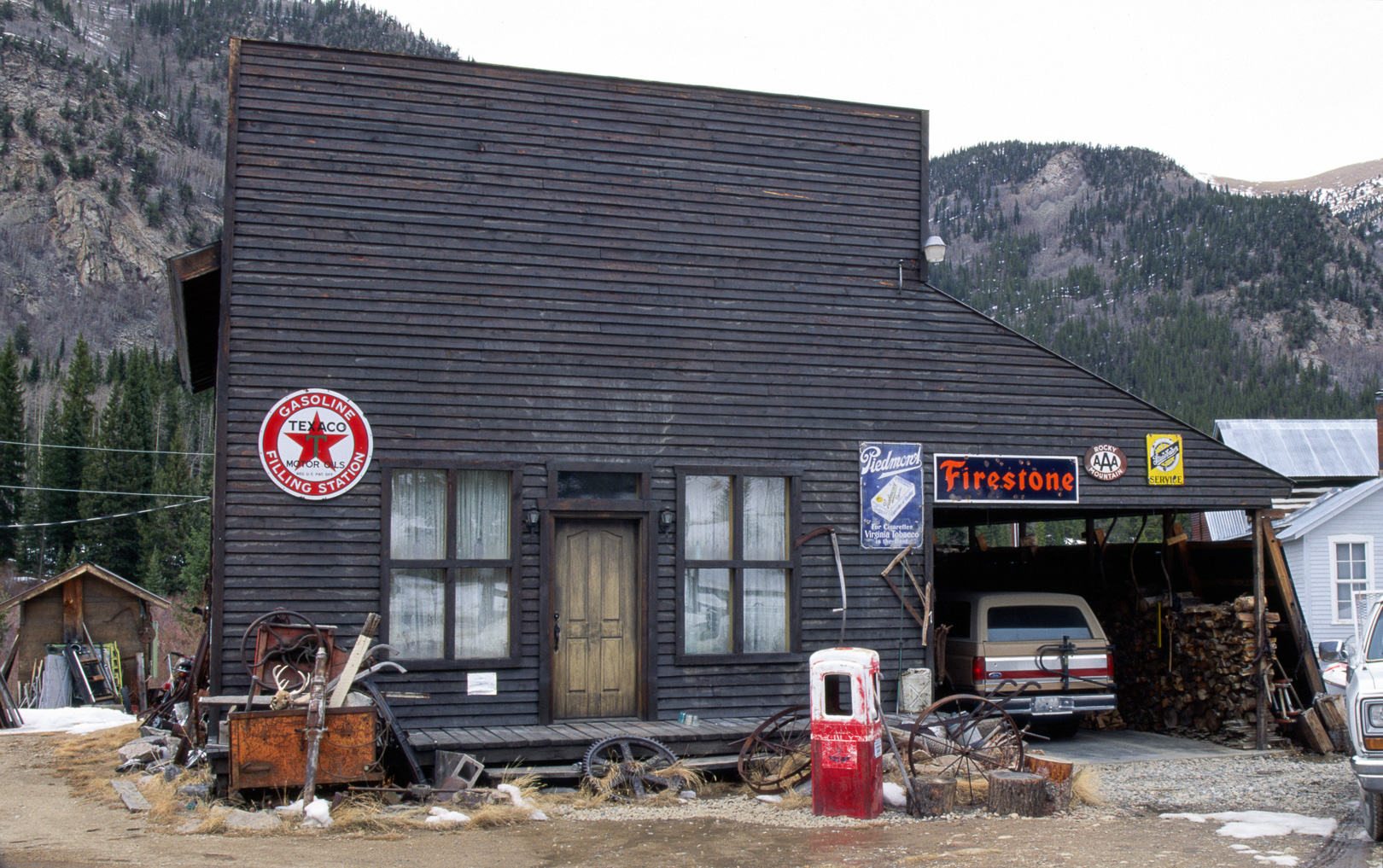
Gasoline filling station

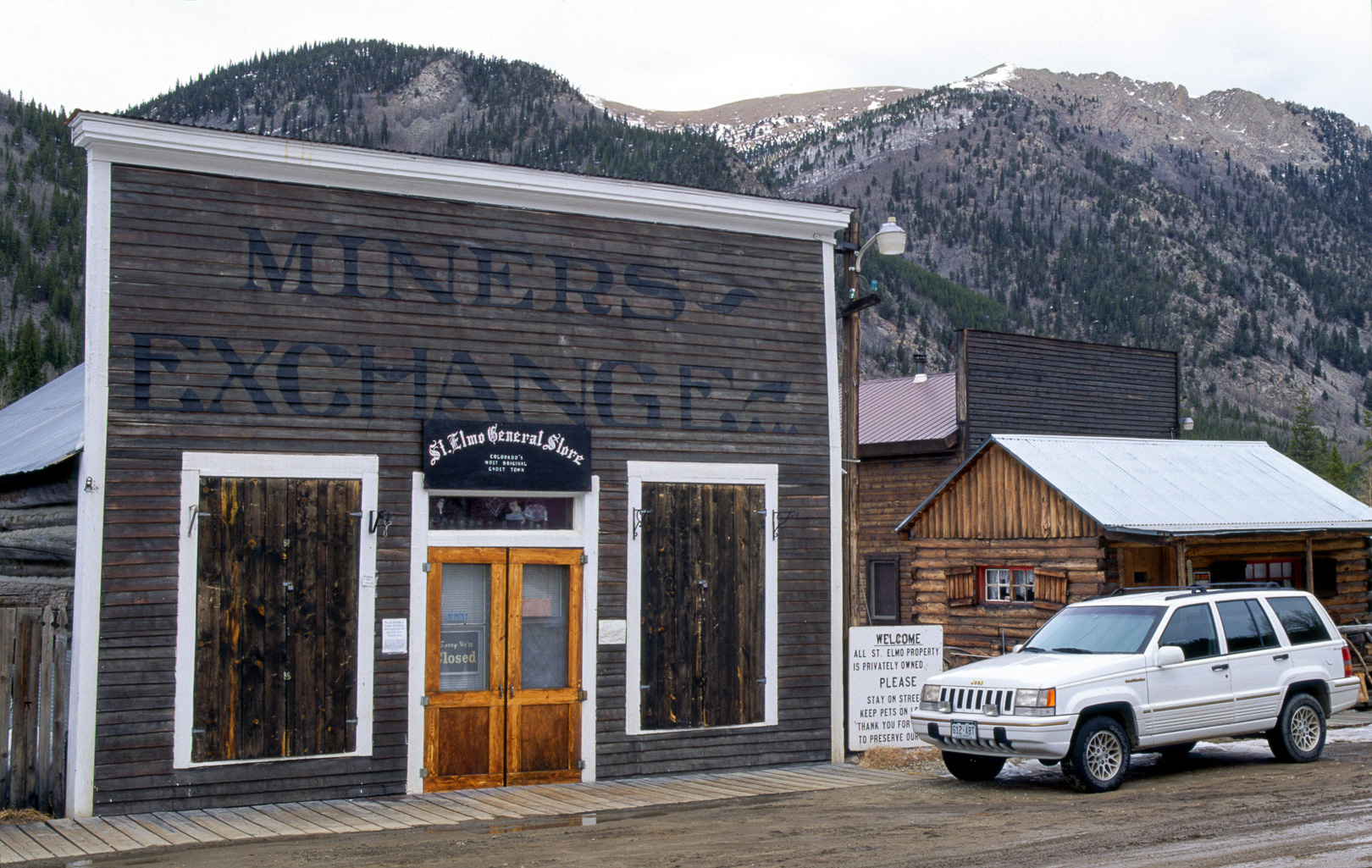
General store

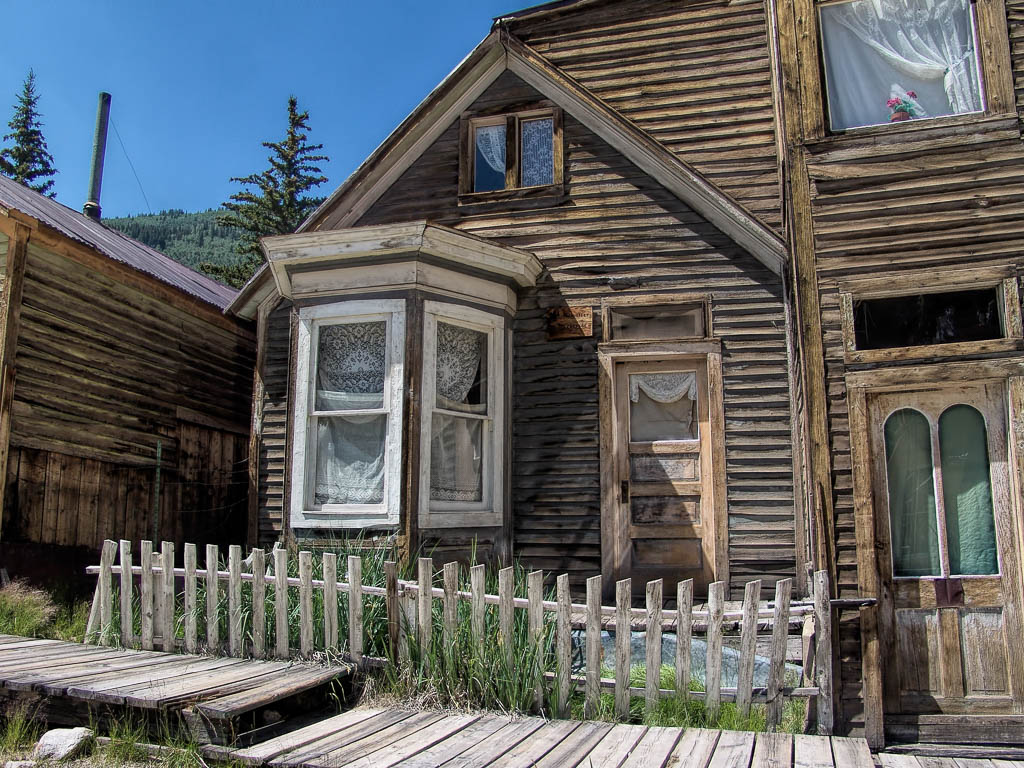
House with bay window

== See also ==
- National Register of Historic Places listings in Chaffee County, Colorado
- Mary Murphy Mine
