= Flat Top (Gunnison County, Colorado) =

Mountain in the state of Colorado

- Flattop
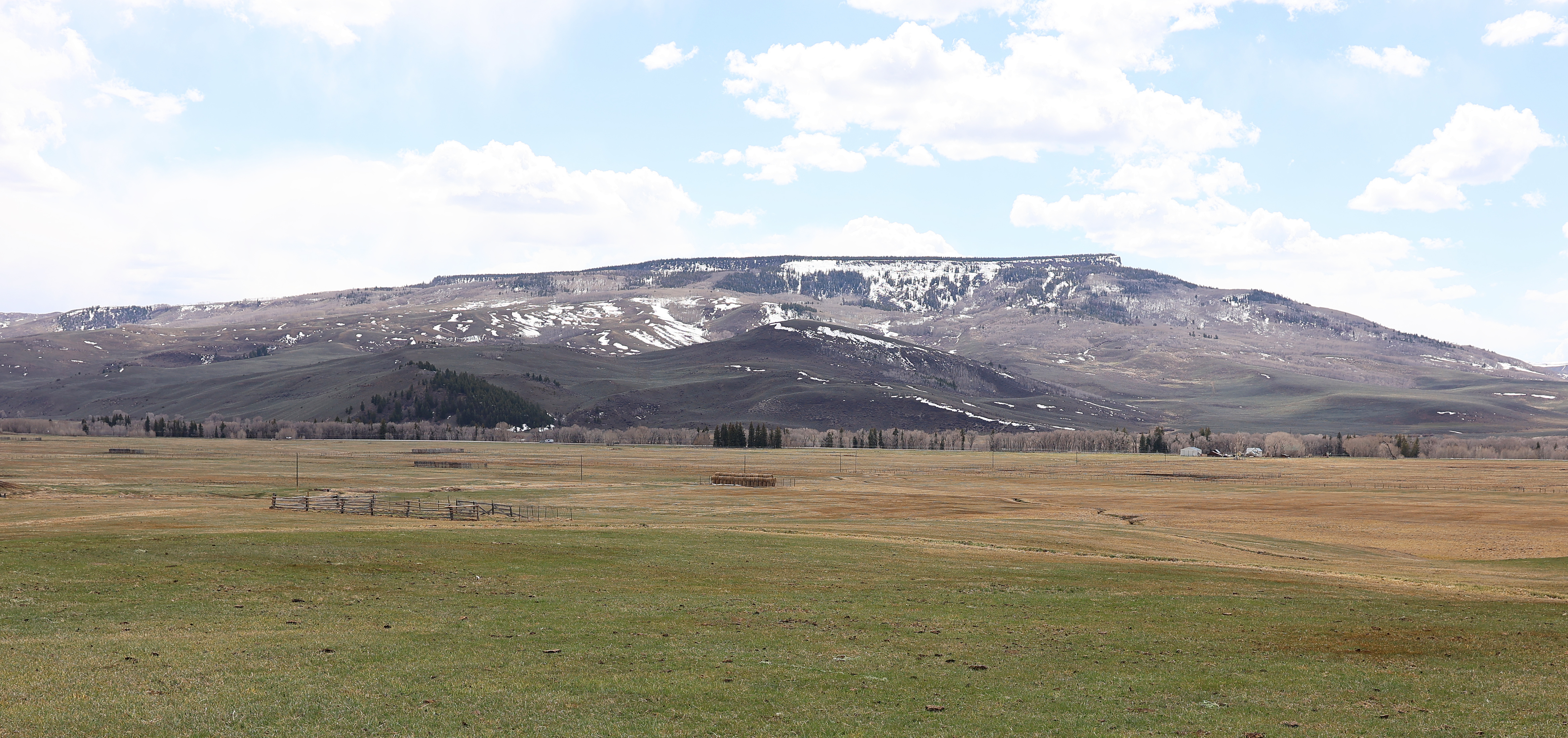
- The mountain in 2025 viewed from Jack's Cabin Cutoff, north of Almont

Highest point
- Elevation: 10,581 ft (3,225 m)
- Prominence: 1,071 ft (326 m)
- Isolation: 4.15 mi (6.68 km)
- Coordinates: 38°42′34.06″N 106°54′33.89″W

Geography
- Location within Colorado
- Location: Gunnison County, Colorado, U.S.
- Parent range: West Elk Mountains
- Topo map(s): USGS 7.5' topographic map Flat Top

Climbing
- Easiest route: hike

Flat Top, elevation 10,581 feet (3,225 meters), is a summit in the West Elk Mountains north of Gunnison in Gunnison County, Colorado, U.S. The peak is within the Gunnison National Forest.

== Geology ==
The top of the mountain is covered with a basaltic lava flow laid down during the Miocene.
