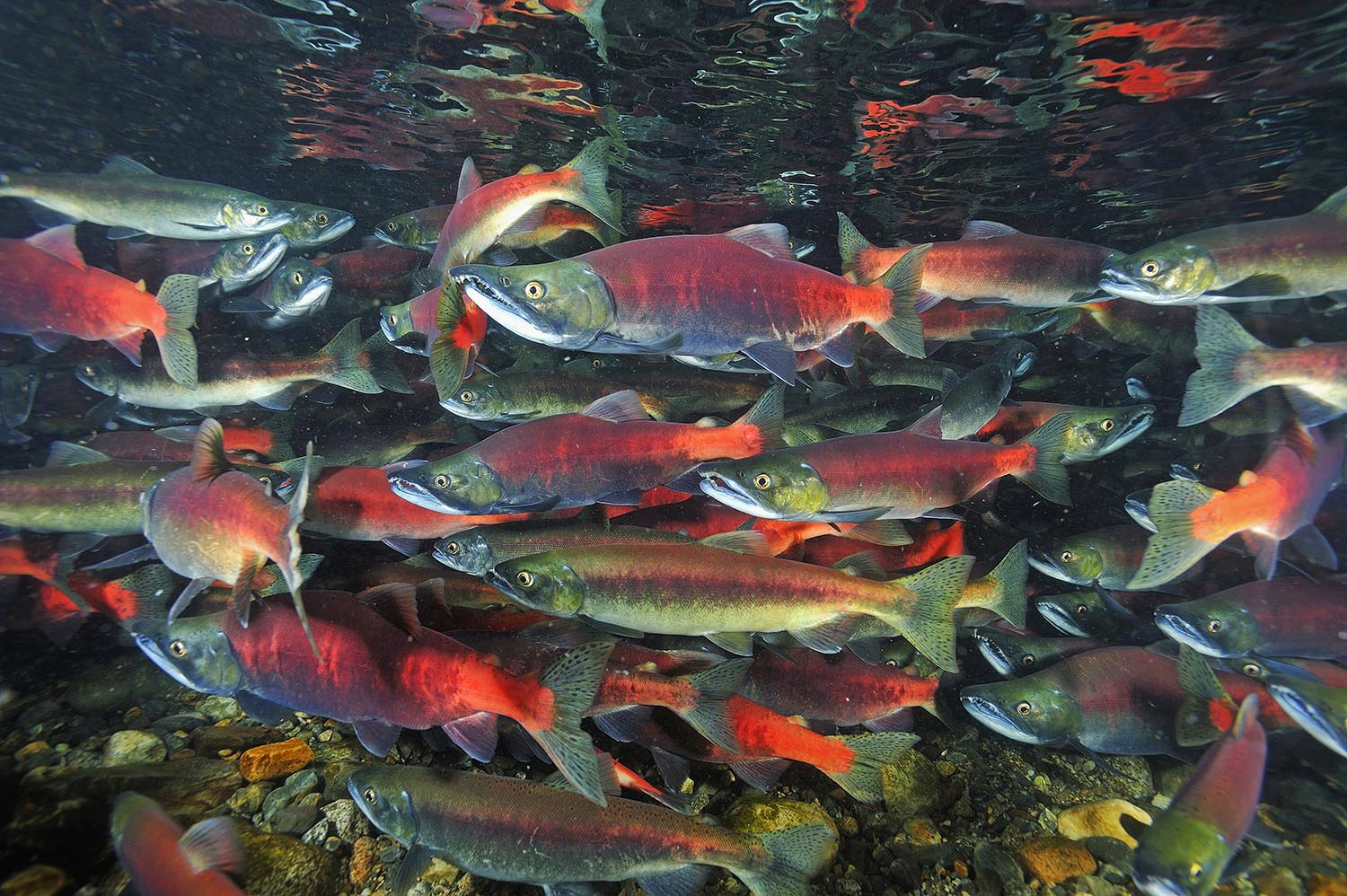
- Schooling in a stream near Lake Tahoe, California.

Scientific classification
- Kingdom: Animalia
- Phylum: Chordata
- Class: Actinopterygii
- Division: Teleostei
- Order: Salmoniformes
- Family: Salmonidae
- Genus: Oncorhynchus
- Species: O. nerka

Binomial name
- Oncorhynchus nerka (Walbaum, 1792)

Synonyms
- Hypsifario kennerlyi (Suckley, 1861); Oncorhynchus adonis Jordan & McGregor, 1925; Oncorhynchus nerka subsp. kennerlyi (Suckley, 1861); Oncorhynchus nerka subsp. nerka (Walbaum, 1792); Salmo kennerlyi Suckley, 1861; Salmo nerka Walbaum, 1792; Salmo paucidens Richardson, 1836

= Kokanee salmon =

Species of fish

The kokanee salmon (Oncorhynchus nerka), also known as the kokanee trout, little redfish, silver trout, kikanning, Kennerly's salmon, Kennerly's trout, Himemasu or walla, is the nonanadromous form of the sockeye salmon (meaning that they do not migrate to the sea, instead living out their entire lives in fresh water). Some debate exists as to whether the kokanee and its sea-going relative are separate species; geographic isolation, failure to interbreed, and genetic distinction point toward a recent divergence in the history of the two groups. The divergence most likely occurred around 15,000 years ago when a large ice melt created a series of freshwater lakes and rivers across the northern part of North America. While some members of the salmon and trout family (salmonids) went out to sea (anadromous), others stayed behind in fresh water (nonanadromous). The separation of the sockeye and the kokanee created a unique example of sympatric speciation that is relatively new in evolutionary terms. While they occupy the same areas and habitats during the breeding season, when ocean-going sockeye salmon return to fresh water to spawn, the two populations do not mate with each other in some regions, suggesting speciation.

== Etymology ==
The word kokanee means "red fish" in the Sinixt Interior Salish language, and "silver trout" in the Okanagan language.

== Distribution ==
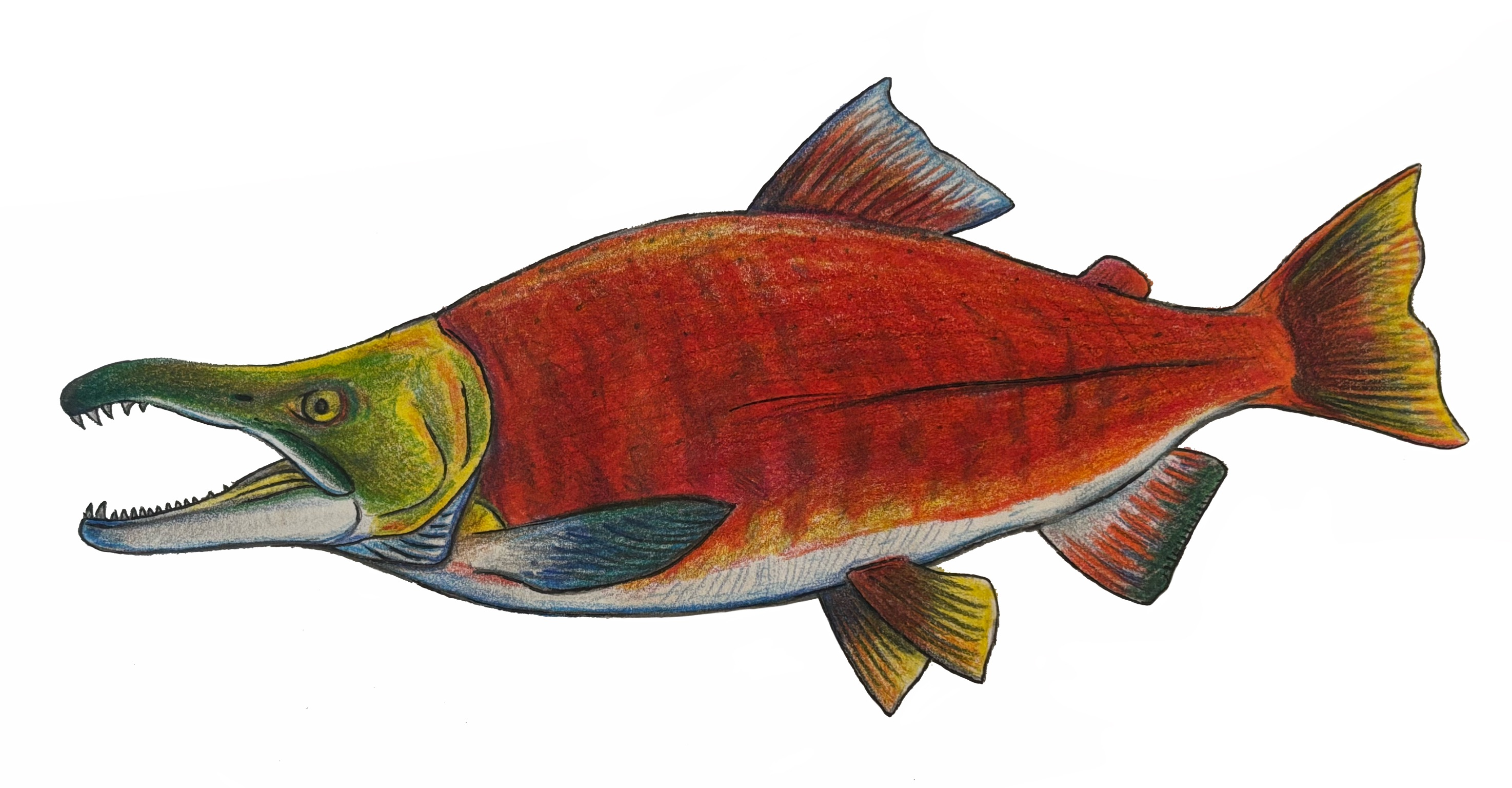
illustration of spawning male

Kokanee are native to many lakes in the western United States and Canada, including Alaska, Washington, Oregon, California, and Idaho in the United States and British Columbia and Yukon in Canada. Populations of kokanee are also found in Japan and Russia. Additionally, kokanee have been introduced to many other lakes in the United States, including in those states mentioned above, as well as in Montana, Wyoming, Nevada, Utah, Colorado, Arizona, and New Mexico in the west, and some New England states, New York, and North Carolina in the east. Kokanee have also been introduced to lakes in southern Alberta and Saskatchewan in Canada.

== Genetic and morphological diversity ==
Debate remains as to whether the kokanee has enough genetic distinction to be classified as a subspecies or a separate species from the sockeye salmon. Genetic evidence suggests that the evolution of landlocked sockeye has occurred more than once with different kokanee populations, showing genetic differences between populations. Most evidence points to events that land-locked the lake-type sockeye (which spawns in streams and lakes, rather than tributaries like the sea-type sockeye, but is still anadromous and spends most of its adult life out at sea), which evolved into the nonanadromous form. Genetic evidence from kokanee in the Fraser River drainage and Columbia River drainage shows that ancestors of the kokanee came from the lake-type sockeye. The data also suggest that the kokanee may have evolved back into a lake-type anadromous form at some point in recent history, although a lack of interbreeding exists between sockeye and it in the drainage systems. Genetic distinction between sockeye and kokanee that cohabitate varies significantly from region to region, with some populations showing distinct divergence, but others showing very little divergence. Studies done in Okanagan Lake in British Columbia and Lake Sammamish in Washington suggested that the genetic diversity between the lake-type sockeye and the kokanee marks the divergence of two species because cohabitating sockeye and kokanee did not interbreed, despite the fact that interbreeding was possible.

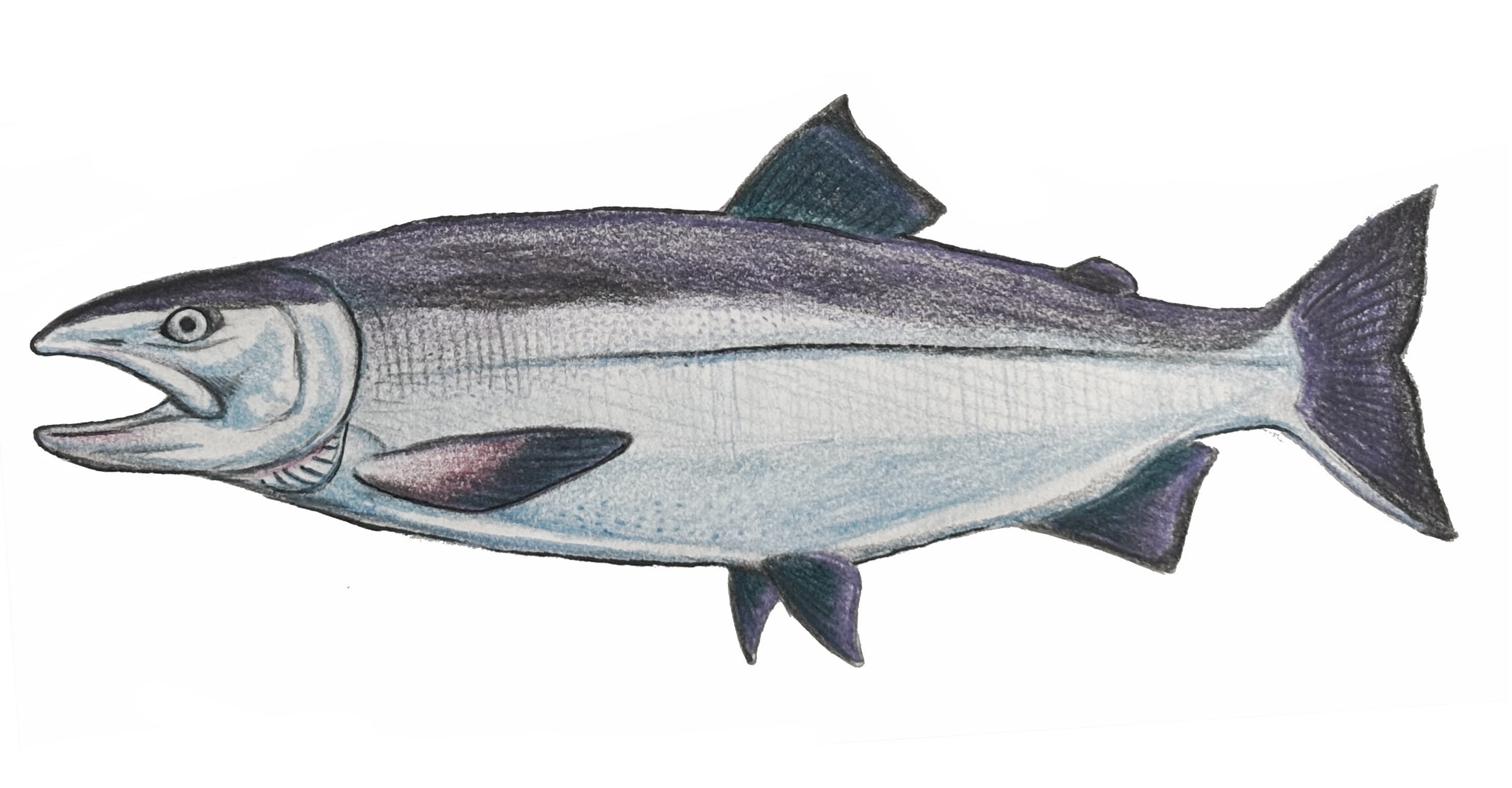
Illustration of male

Some morphological divergences are seen between the kokanee and sockeye. The most noticeable difference is size. The kokanee is often smaller than the sockeye due to less nutrient availability in fresh water. Other morphological differences include higher gill raker counts in the kokanee, failure to develop the changes that allow the sockeye to transition between fresh and salt water, and juvenile kokanee's lower mean swim velocity compared to juvenile sockeye. Egg sizes are also a difference. Due to its size, the kokanee should theoretically have smaller eggs to increase fecundity. In reality, the kokanee egg size varies, though the energetic cost of larger eggs can limit the fecundity of kokanee populations. Studies have found that kokanees can extract carotenoids (which provide red pigmentation during breeding) from food better than sockeyes due to sexual selection and mate choice. Again, the degree of morphological variation, such as gill raker count, can vary from population to population.

The Japanese kokanee, also known as the kunimasu salmon or black kokanee, is considered a subspecies of the sockeye salmon by some, or even a separate species Oncorhynchus kawamurae, and occurs naturally in Lakes Akan and Chimikeppu in Hokkaido. The creation of a dam caused the extermination of the fish by changing the lake pH. As a result, the kokanee was believed to have gone extinct in the 1940s. In 2011, a few fish were found in an isolated lake on Mount Fuji.

The Japanese kokanee varies from its sea-going sockeye relative in a few ways. The black kokanee breeds in March at a depth of 30–40 feet, while sockeye salmon breed in the fall and have a different number of gill rakers than the kokanee. In addition, the black kokanee is much darker in color than the sockeye or any other kokanee population. The fish has been introduced to different lakes around Japan for commercial fishing practices. It seems that commercial captive-breeding programs, the introduction of non-native kokanee populations from Canada, and a population crash have decreased the genetic distinctiveness between the black kokanee and its sockeye relatives. These factors have also caused a decrease in native kokanee populations.

== Identification, lifecycle, and development ==
While size range of kokanee is often lake-specific and depends on many factors, in typical populations, the kokanee grows to a typical size of 23–30 centimetres (9–12 in) with an average weight of 0.45 kilograms (1 lb). In bodies of water with more favorable conditions, it can reach a size up to 51 centimetres (20 in) and weigh 1.4–2.3 kilograms (3–5 lb). The largest documented kokanee, caught by hand in Lower Arrow Lake in British Columbia in 2015, weighed 5.5 kilograms (12.1 lb). Adult kokanee can be found in open water where the thermocline is around 10 °C (50 °F). They can have between 29 and 40 gill rakers. As fish that inhabit fresh water throughout their lifecycle, they are often smaller than their sea-going sockeye relatives, due to less food availability. Size is the most significant morphological distinction between the kokanee and the sockeye, but gill raker count can differ from sockeye salmon, as well. The main food source of this fish is plankton. "Kokanee have blue backs and silver sides and unlike other salmon and trout, except chum salmon, sockeye and kokanee lack distinct dark spots on their backs and tail fins. In addition, when compared to other trout, they have finer scales, larger eyes, and a deeply forked tail".

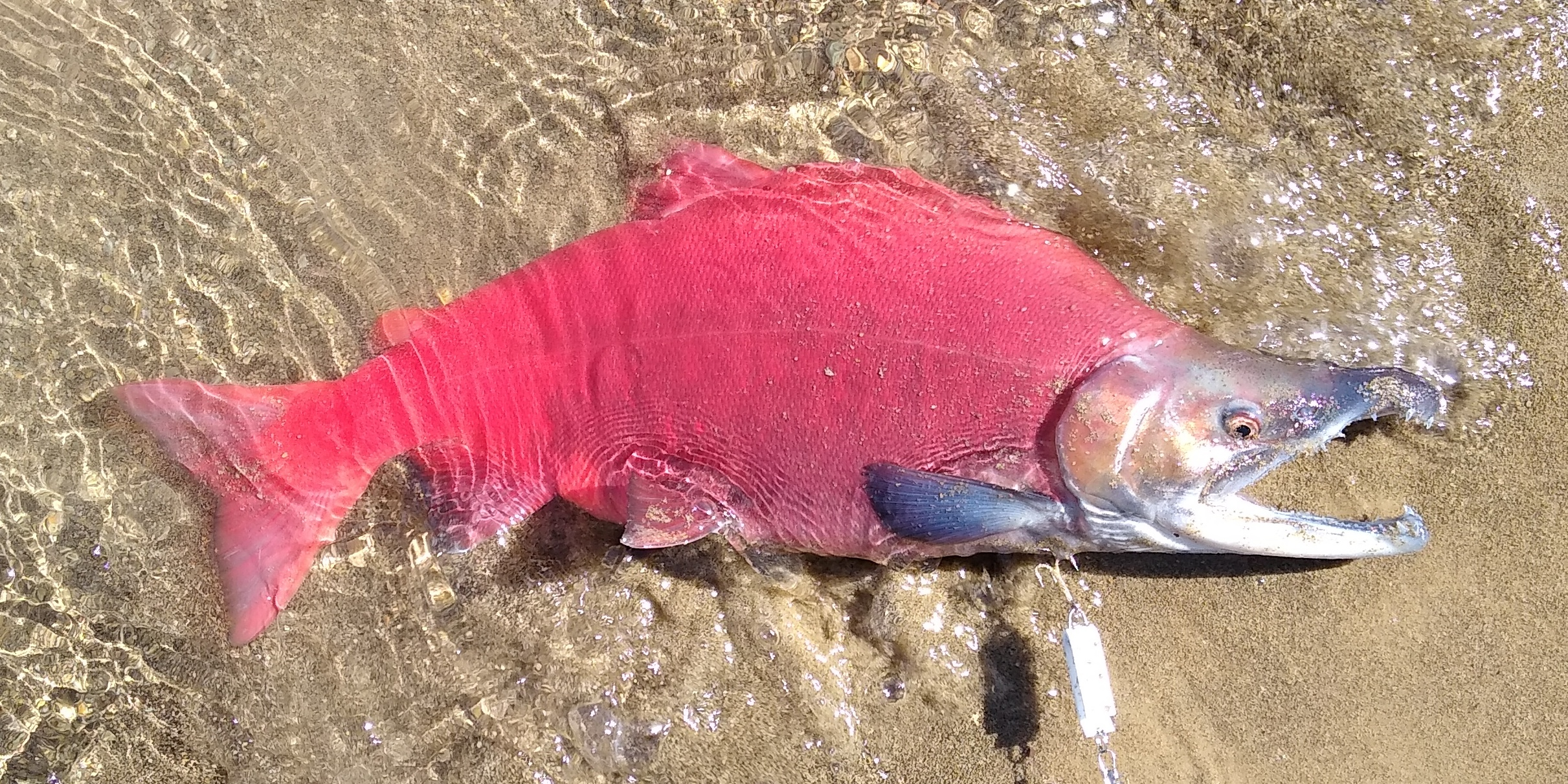
Typical example of a landlocked freshwater male kokanee salmon during the spawn

The typical lifecycle of the kokanee is similar to that of other salmon. They are born in a stream and migrate down to a lake where they spend most of their adult lives. Kokanee typically live for four years in a lake before heading back to spawning grounds to spawn and die. However, population longevity can vary between two and seven years. A kokanee can spawn in a variety of different times called runs. Individual populations can have multiple runs associated with the kokanee in a lake and occur from August to February. Some kokanee have been seen spawning in April. The female kokanee creates a nest called a redd. She then lays around 1,000 eggs, depending on food availability. Eggs hatch within 110 days, and the juveniles swim out to the lake.

Through most of the kokanee's lifecycle, differentiating between the male and female salmon can be difficult. When they spawn, the male salmon become distinctly different; the males turn bright red and develop a humped back and an elongated jaw similar to the male sockeye salmon. Females also take on a dark red hue during the breeding season, which also corresponds with the breeding season of sockeye salmon.

Competition with introduced lake trout can lead to a decline in kokanee populations during the summer. Lake trout are predatory and will eat young kokanee. Predation by lake trout accounted for 83 of the 88% decline in kokanee populations in Lake Chelan, Washington. Other factors, such as pollution, habitat loss, and warming global temperatures, put the kokanee at risk in some areas.

== Conservation ==
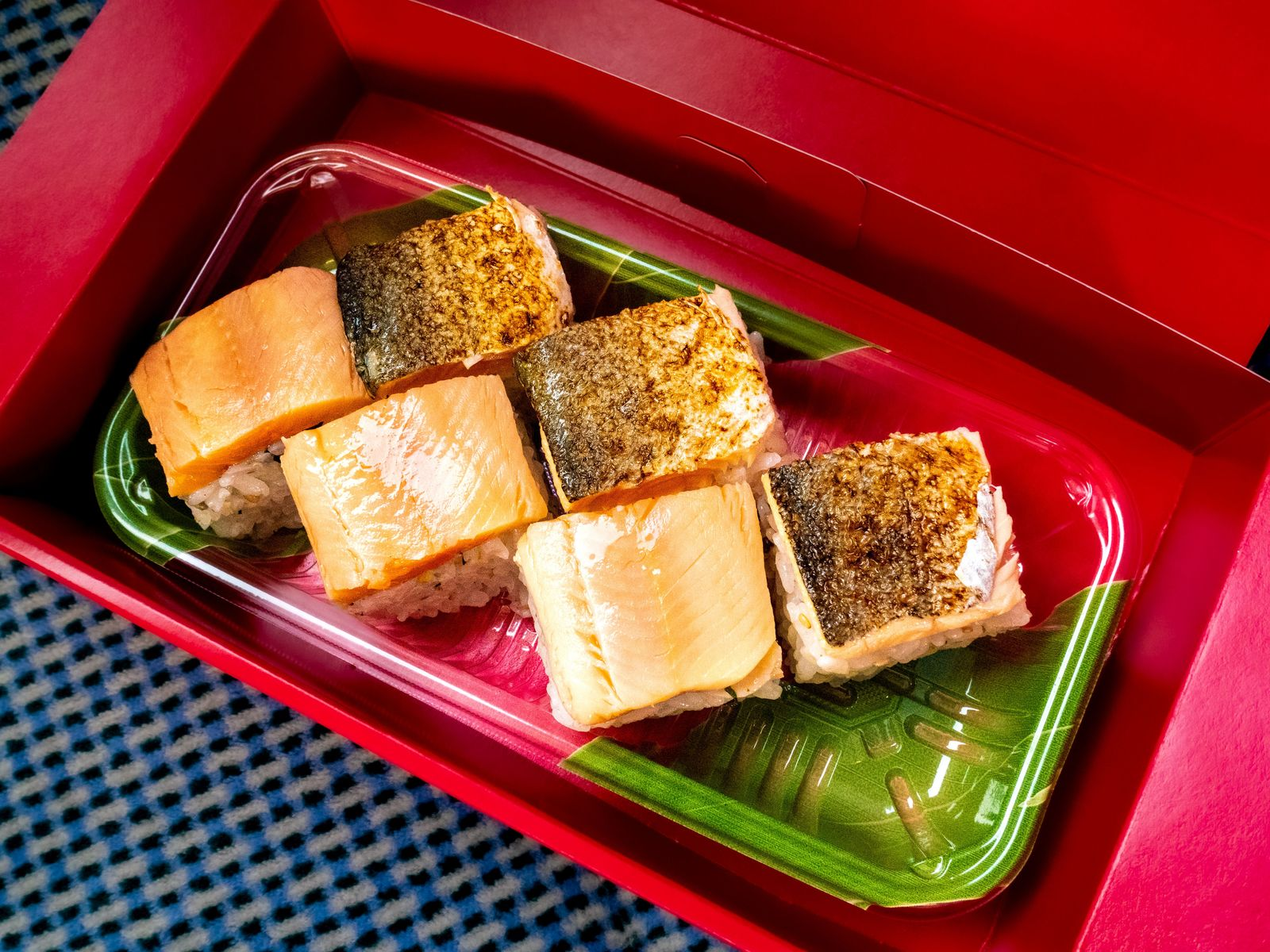
Sushi made with himemasu

Some kokanee populations have declined in the US and Canada, while others thrive. The kokanee's status is variable among different locations under the Endangered Species Act. They are listed as threatened in Ozette Lake in Washington. Other kokanee populations in Washington have shown genetic distinction, but attempts by the Lake Sammamish Kokanee Work Group to get the Lake Sammamish kokanee listed as a separate species and therefore endangered failed the US Fish and Wildlife Service criteria to be listed as a distinct species. The current IUCN red list standing of sockeye salmon (Oncohynchus nerka), which does not distinguish kokanee, is of least concern.

Even so, King County, Washington, in partnership with the US Fish and Wildlife Service, has issued conservation measures to save the fish that once numbered in the thousands. As few as 150 fish spawned in 2007–2008, marking a critical need for conservation of the state's kokanee population. Currently, restoration of streams and habitats, hatchery breeding, and a ban on fishing for kokanee has caused an increase in native kokanee populations.

Lakes in Canada have also seen a decline in native kokanee, with numbers dropping from 2,800 fish to just 88 fish in 2007 in the Kluane National Park and Reserve. The park has outlawed fishing of kokanee, and possession of a kokanee salmon is illegal. Conservation efforts have been largely successful, with 4,660 kokanee spawning in the park in 2015. Why the kokanee population crashed in the mid- and late 2000s is unclear.
