= Broodstock =

Group of mature individuals used in aquaculture for breeding purposes

Broodstock, or broodfish, are a group of mature individuals used in aquaculture for breeding purposes. Broodstock can be a population of animals maintained in captivity as a source of replacement for, or enhancement of, seed and fry numbers. These are generally kept in ponds or tanks in which environmental conditions such as photoperiod, temperature and pH are controlled. Such populations often undergo conditioning to ensure maximum fry output. Broodstock can also be sourced from wild populations where they are harvested and held in maturation tanks before their seed is collected for grow-out to market size or the juveniles returned to the sea to supplement natural populations. This method, however, is subject to environmental conditions and can be unreliable seasonally, or annually. Broodstock management can improve seed quality and number through enhanced gonadal development and fecundity.

== Management ==
Broodstock management involves manipulating environmental factors surrounding the broodstock to ensure maximum survival, enhance gonadal development and increase fecundity. Such conditioning is necessary to ensure the sustainability of aquaculture production, and to increase the number and quality of eggs produced and control the timing of maturation and spawning. Management of the technologies for gamete production in captivity is one of the essential step for aquaculture that would ensure the growth to this sector. Unfortunately, most fish when reared in captivity condition, exhibit some degree of reproduction dysfunction. Many species of captive fish are able to reach reproduction maturity in aquaculture conditions and gonadal growth occurs normally. However, some of female species often fail final oocyte maturation stage. Hormonal manipulation and acceleration of final oocyte maturation due to the economics of broodstock management is important. For instance, in Salmoniformes, the need to collect the eggs by stripping is a serious limitation, while the time of ovulation must be predicted with accuracy, as over-ripening may take place in minutes or hours after ovulation. Therefore, control of broodstock reproductive is essential for the sustainability of commercial aquaculture production.

Choosing species to use requires consideration of the biology of the species. This includes their size at maturity, method of reproduction, feeding behaviour and ability to tolerate adverse conditions Farms also consider whether they grow their own broodstock or obtain them from natural populations. Where natural populations are excluded, the farm can be considered a self-sustaining unit independent of external genetic influence.

Pond-reared broodstocks are selected, often as immature juveniles, and grown out in suitable conditions to sexual maturity. These animals require stable water characteristics and a well-balanced, species-dependent, protein rich diet. This enhances the germinal tissue for future seed stock as it is formed in juveniles.

The pond or tank in which broodfish are held must be a suitable size to hold and condition the broodstock. Dependent on the species involved you need to alter the number of individuals, and often separate the sexes. Sex separation enables the broodstock males and females to be subjected to different conditions where necessary. For example, male and female sturgeons respond to different hormone levels, this also allows more control over eggs and sperm.

The characteristics of the water in which the mature broodstocks are held must be manipulated. The aquaculturist must consider the appropriate oxygen concentration, temperature, and pH of the water all of which can be species specific.

The feeding regime of broodstocks is species specific and requires consideration of timing and composition of the food. Protein, lipid and fatty acid composition is particularly important. The quantity of food intake can be altered to influence spawning and maturity, for example low rations have been shown to reduce the number of fish reaching maturity while increasing the fecundity of those which do.

When fry are desired, spawning can be induced in broodstocks by manipulation of relevant environmental factors. In particular the photoperiod can be altered to imply that it is time to spawn. A shortened photoperiod is known to advance spawning times while a lengthened photoperiod can delay spawning. Artificial light can be used to change the apparent day length and indicate different seasonal features so as to delay spawning. Water temperature can be increased for the same purpose. Following spawning the female broodfish are often stressed and have lost weight. They require extra care and abundant feeding at this time to ensure survival to the next spawning season.

== Advantages ==
Managers can select for reproductive characteristics which influence the egg producing capability of individuals and increase fecundity by providing them with optimal environment and diets. This is further possible in pond-reared populations where traits can be selected for over generations for example, for higher fecundity.

The breeding season and spawning times can be shifted thus expanding the seasonal range of production. This leads to more efficient aquaculture because fry are available to the market year round. Hormonal treatments can advance spawning by two to three weeks. Manipulating photoperiod can alter spawning time by over four months and is cheap and straightforward to achieve.

Broodstock managers can use or select for traits such as fast growth rates or disease resistance over generations to produce more desirable fish. This ability for genetic improvement of stocks is more efficient and produces higher value stock. Broodstocks also enable you to selectively plan and control all matings. Selective breeding is an important part of the domestication of aquaculture species.

Pond-reared broodstocks benefit from the removal of predation which can be a significant cause of mortality in natural populations. They further benefit from the removal of variable environmental impacts.

Holding broodstock in an accessible pond or tank offers readily available breeding adults whenever required.

== Disadvantages ==
When broodstocks are used to supplement natural populations they face different selective pressures to normal. Thus they may not have adequate fitness to survive the natural environment, or can alter and decrease natural genetic diversity due to the bottleneck nature of breeding from a smaller population.

Broodstocks require supplementation from outside sources regularly to prevent negative effects of closed populations. Domestication of broodstocks in hatcheries can reduce reproductive capabilities and alter other genetic characteristics. For example, a trout stock maintained as a closed population for 20 generations showed reduced number and size of egg production.

== Examples ==
=== Penaeidae ===
Shrimp, particularly of the family Penaeidae, are one of the largest internationally traded species. Native stocks are usually collected as sources of broodstock supply. There are also examples of pond-reared Penaeidae broodstocks. These shrimp are raised in suitable environmental conditions including a 12–14 hour/day photoperiod, a water temperature of 25–29 °C and full seawater salinity with high water exchange rates.

=== Sydney rock oyster ===
The Sydney rock oyster, Saccostrea glomerata, has been farmed in New South Wales, Australia for over 100 years. Due to declines in the supply in the past 30 years, New South Wales introduced a selection program in 1990 to breed faster growing stocks. The utilised broodstocks are held in artificial ponds of around 0.11 ha in size, and at low densities. Broodstocks provided higher numbers of larvae and could be spawned readily providing a more definite source of Sydney rock oysters.

=== Rainbow trout ===
Global production of rainbow trout, Oncorhynchus mykiss, requires over 3 billion eggs per year. This number is met because of broodstocks which undergo selection and conditioning in hatcheries. Trout have been reared artificially for over 80 years. Rainbow trout broodstocks are commonly manipulated to delay maturation and spawning time in order to provide eggs regularly and optimise supply. Artificial selection has favoured larger fish due to evidence of correlations between fish size and fecundity.
