= Colorado Parks and Wildlife =

State agency of Colorado, United States

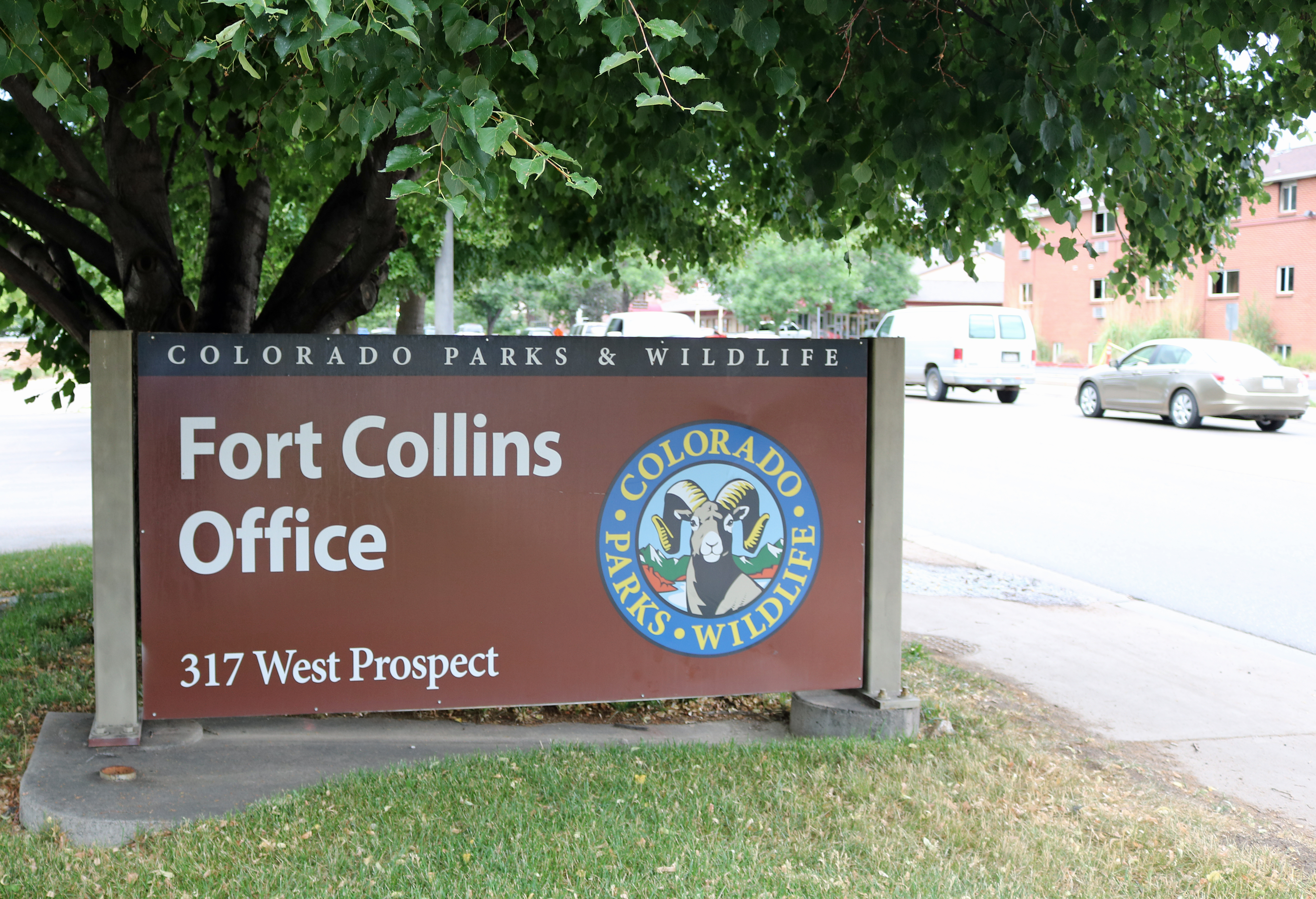
- The sign in front of the Fort Collins office.

Agency overview
- Headquarters: 6060 Broadway Denver, Colorado
- Agency executive: Laura Clellan, Director
- Parent agency: Colorado Department of Natural Resources
- Website: cpw.state.co.us

Colorado Parks and Wildlife manages the state parks system and the wildlife of the U.S. state of Colorado. Responsibilities include state parks, wildlife areas, and the Colorado Natural Areas Program.

== History ==
- 1937 – The state legislature appointed a land board to create the first State Parks Board.
- 1951 – The State Parks Board leased Cherry Creek recreation area from the Army Corps of Engineers.
- 1963 – State Parks was merged with the Division of Wildlife.
- 1971 – The State Recreational Trails Program was created.
- 1972 – State Parks and the Division of Wildlife were separated.
- 1977 – State Parks was requested to manage the snowmobile program for the state.
- 1984 – State Parks became responsible for licensing river outfitters.
- 1990 – State parks began managing the off-highway vehicle program.
- 1992 - Voters approved the Great Outdoors Colorado constitutional amendment directing Colorado Lottery revenues to the outdoors, including 10 percent directly to state Parks and Wildlife division. About half goes to Great Outdoors Colorado (GOCO) Trust Fund, which in turns grants money to the agency.
- 2011 - Colorado State Parks and the Colorado Division of Wildlife are merged into Colorado Parks and Wildlife.

== Wildlife management and hunting ==
Gray wolves are native to North America, including Colorado and were once present across the state. Overhunting of common prey (especially elk) and an increase in livestock numbers forced them into conflict with ranchers. Wolves were hunted, trapped and poisoned into local extinction by the 1940s.

While the agency is responsible for wildlife management and hunting, ballot initiatives have allowed Colorado voters to weigh in on some issues. The Commission rejected a proposal to reintroduce the gray wolf in 2016, citing the potential impact on big game and livestock ranching in the state as well as the fact that the national gray wolf population elsewhere had already exceeded federal conservation goals. Resolutions by the Commission opposing reintroduction had also been passed in 1982 and 1989.

With a November 2020 ballot measure, voters directed the Commission to develop a plan to begin to restore and manage wolves by the end of 2023, somewhere on the Western Slope and offer fair compensation for any livestock killed by the predators. The measure designated wolves as non-game, meaning they cannot be hunted.

== Parks and other managed areas ==
As of 2023, there were forty-three State Parks open to the public, including the Cameo Shooting and Education Complex. The 2023 edition of Your guide to Colorado's state parks describes two state parks not included in the total and still in development with limited public access: Lone Mesa and Sweetwater Lake.

In 2021, CPW, the United States Forest Service, and the Eagle Valley Land Trust announced a proposed partnership for CPW to manage the Sweetwater Lake area in Garfield County, Colorado. The land remains part of the White River National Forest. In 2026, the Forest Service's draft environmental impact statement evaluated a 20-year special-use permit under which CPW would manage the area, including alternatives ranging from continued Forest Service management to expanded recreation development. The proposed CPW-managed alternative drew community opposition concerning development scale, projected visitation, wildlife impacts, and emergency access on Sweetwater Road. In 2024 scoping comments, Roaring Fork Audubon and the Roaring Fork Group of the Sierra Club opposed a state-park alternative and advocated lower-development options, citing potential wildlife disturbance, habitat fragmentation, wetlands, water quality, and increased visitation.

As of 2017, the division managed the 42 state parks and 307 wildlife areas of Colorado.

As of 2016, the Colorado Natural Areas Program had 93 designated sites which protected more than 250 endangered, rare, or threatened species.

== Colorado Parks and Wildlife Commission ==
The Colorado Parks and Wildlife Commission is a group of eleven members who are appointed by the Governor of Colorado with legislative approval. The Board is charged with representing various geographic regions of the state while providing oversight and setting agency policy in a democratic way to assure the agency is responsive to the citizens of Colorado. This board meets every other month to review and set policy.

== Outdoor regional partnerships ==
CPW gives grants to private organizations through outdoor regional partnerships. In 2026, CPW had 21 regional partnerships such as Pikes Peak Outdoor Recreation Alliance.

== See also ==
- Colorado Department of Natural Resources
