= List of Colorado state wildlife areas =

Coordinates: 38.9972°N 105.5478°W

The location of the State of Colorado in the United States of America.

The Colorado state wildlife areas are managed for hunting, fishing, observation, management, and preservation of wildlife. The Colorado Parks and Wildlife division of the U.S. State of Colorado manages more than 300 state wildlife areas with a total area of more than 860 square miles (2,230 km^{2}) in the state.

== Fishing or hunting license required for entry ==
Beginning July 1, 2020, anyone entering a Colorado state wildlife area is required to carry a valid fishing or hunting license. The cheapest license is a fishing license, which costs US$38 in 2020. The fine for entering a state wildlife area without a valid license is US$139.50. This new rule was instituted by the Colorado Parks and Wildlife Commission to deal with a budget shortfall. In 2021, Colorado Parks and Wildlife implemented the Colorado State Wildlife Area Pass for individuals who prefer not to purchase a hunting or fishing license. The annual pass costs US$46.48 and includes the required US$10.40 Colorado Wildlife Habitat Stamp.

== State wildlife areas ==
- 63 Ranch State Wildlife Area
- Adams State Wildlife Area
- Adobe Creek Reservoir State Wildlife Area at Blue Lake
- Alberta Park Reservoir State Wildlife Area
- Alma State Wildlife Area
- Almont Triangle State Wildlife Area
- Andrews Lake State Wildlife Area
- Andrick Ponds State Wildlife Area
- Apishapa State Wildlife Area
- Arkansas River/Big Bend SWA
- Atwood State Wildlife Area
- Badger Basin State Wildlife Area
- Banner Lakes State Wildlife Area
- Basalt State Wildlife Area
- Bayfield Lions Club Shooting Range
- Beaver Creek Reservoir State Wildlife Area
- Beaver Creek State Wildlife Area
- Beaver Lake State Wildlife Area
- Bellaire Lake State Wildlife Area
- Bellvue-Watson State Fish Unit (state fish hatchery)
- Bergen Peak State Wildlife Area
- Big Meadows Reservoir State Wildlife Area
- Big Thompson Ponds State Wildlife Area
- Bighorn Springs SWA (Fishing Easement)
- Bill Patterson SWA
- Billy Creek State Wildlife Area
- Bitter Brush State Wildlife Area
- Blacktail Conservation easement
- Bliss State Wildlife Area
- Blue River State Wildlife Area
- Bob Terrell State Wildlife Area (formerly the Roaring Fork State Wildlife Area - Koziel Parcel)
- Bodo State Wildlife Area
- Boedecker Reservoir State Wildlife Area
- Bosque Del Oso State Wildlife Area
- Boyd Ponds State Wildlife Area
- Bravo State Wildlife Area
- Brower State Wildlife Area
- Brown Lakes State Wildlife Area
- Brown's Park State Wildlife Area - Beaver Creek Unit
- Brown's Park State Wildlife Area - Calloway Unit
- Brown's Park State Wildlife Area - Cold Springs
- Brown's Park State Wildlife Area - Wiggins Unit
- Brownlee State Wildlife Area (fishing lease on the North Platte River)
- Brush Creek State Wildlife Area
- Brush Hollow State Wildlife Area
- Brush Prairie Ponds State Wildlife Area
- Brush State Wildlife Area
- Buena Vista State Wildlife Area
- Burchfield State Wildlife Area
- Cabin Creek State Wildlife Area
- Centennial State Wildlife Area
- Centennial Valley State Wildlife Area
- Chalk Cliffs State Fish Unit (state fish hatchery)
- Champion State Wildlife Area
- Charlie Meyers State Wildlife Area
- Cherokee State Wildlife Area - Lone Pine Unit
- Cherokee State Wildlife Area - Rabbit Creek Unit
- Cherokee State Wildlife Area - Middle Unit
- Cherokee State Wildlife Area - Upper Unit
- Cherokee State Wildlife Area - Lower Unit
- Chipeta Lake State Wildlife Area
- Christina State Wildlife Area
- Chubb Park Ranch State Wildlife Area
- Chuck Lewis State Wildlife Area
- Cimarron State Wildlife Area
- Clear Creek Reservoir State Wildlife Area
- Cline Ranch State Wildlife Area
- Coalbed Canyon State Wildlife Area
- Cochetopa State Wildlife Area
- Coke Oven State Wildlife Area
- Coller State Wildlife Area
- Colorado River Island State Wildlife Area
- Colorow Mountain State Wildlife Area
- Columbine State Wildlife Area
- Conejos River State Wildlife Area (fishing easements)
- Cottonwood Creek State Wildlife Area (Marquard fishing easement)
- Cottonwood State Wildlife Area
- Cowdrey Lake State Wildlife Area
- Creede State Wildlife Area
- Crystal River State Fish Unit (state fish hatchery)
- Dan Noble State Wildlife Area
- Dawn Pond State Wildlife Area
- Deadman State Wildlife Area
- Delaney Butte Lakes State Wildlife Area
- Devil Creek State Wildlife Area
- DeWeese Reservoir State Wildlife Area
- Diamond J State Wildlife Area
- Dolores River State Wildlife Area
- Dome Lakes State Wildlife Area
- Dome Rock State Wildlife Area (formerly the Mueller State Wildlife Area)
- Douglas Reservoir State Wildlife Area
- Dowdy Lake State Wildlife Area
- Dry Creek Basin State Wildlife Area
- Duck Creek State Wildlife Area
- Dune Ridge State Wildlife Area
- Durango State Fish Unit (state fish hatchery)
- Dutch Gulch State Wildlife Area
- Eagle River State Wildlife Area (fishing leases)
- Echo Canyon Reservoir State Wildlife Area
- Elliott State Wildlife Area
- Emerald Mountain State Wildlife Area
- Escalante State Wildlife Area - Cap Smith Tract
- Escalante State Wildlife Area - East Walker Tract
- Escalante State Wildlife Area - Hamilton Tract
- Escalante State Wildlife Area - Harrison Tract
- Escalante State Wildlife Area - Lower Roubideau Tract
- Escalante State Wildlife Area - Picket Corral Tract
- Escalante State Wildlife Area - Upper Roubideau and Peach Orchard
- Escalante State Wildlife Area - Waterwheel, Kelso, and Lower Gunnison River Tracts
- Escalante State Wildlife Area - West Walker Tract
- Finger Rock State Fish Unit (state fish hatchery)
- Fish Creek State Wildlife Area
- Flagler Res. State Wildlife Area
- Flanders Ranch State Wildlife Area
- Forks State Wildlife Area
- Fort Lyon State Wildlife Area
- Four Mile State Wildlife Area
- Frank State Wildlife Area
- Franklin Island State Wildlife Area
- Franz Lake State Wildlife Area
- Frenchman Creek State Wildlife Area
- Garfield Creek State Wildlife Area
- Georgetown State Wildlife Area
- Georgetown Watchable Wildlife Area
- Glenwood Springs State Fish Unit (state fish hatchery)
- Granada State Wildlife Area
- Granby Ranch Conservation Easement
- Granite State Wildlife Area
- Grieve Ranch Conservation Easement State Wildlife Area
- Groundhog Reservoir State Wildlife Area
- Gunnison River State Wildlife Area
- Gunnison State Wildlife Area
- Gypsum Ponds State Wildlife Area
- Hallenbeck Ranch State Wildlife Area (currently closed)
- Hardeman (fishing easement)

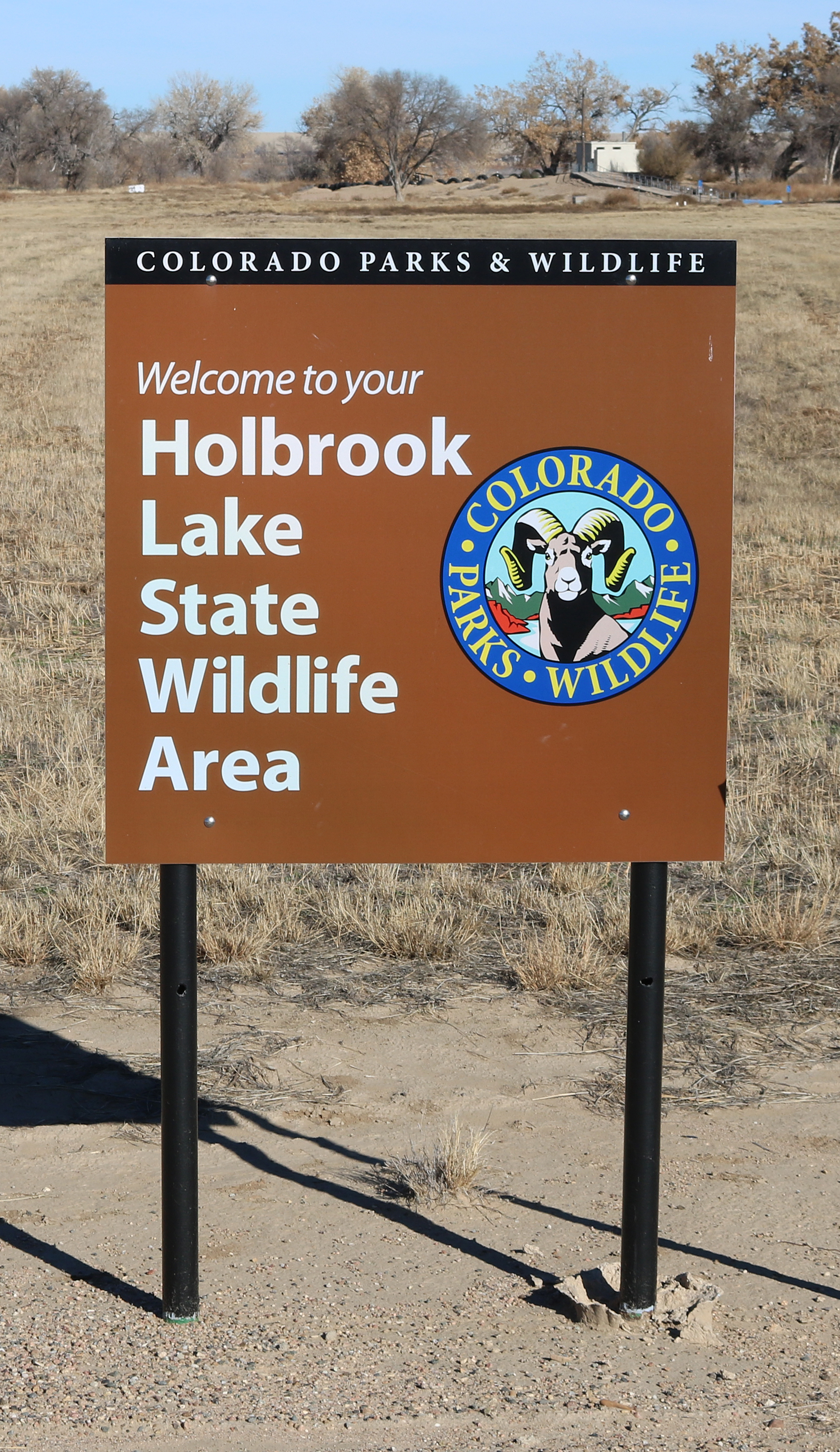
Holbrook Reservoir State Wildlife Area

- Harmon State Wildlife Area (fishing easement)
- Haviland Lake State Wildlife Area
- Heckendorf State Wildlife Area
- Higel State Wildlife Area
- Hohnholz Lakes State Wildlife Area
- Holbrook Reservoir State Wildlife Area
- Holly State Wildlife Area
- Holyoke State Wildlife Area
- Home Lake State Wildlife Area
- Horse Creek Reservoir State Wildlife Area at Timber Lake
- Horsethief Canyon State Wildlife Area
- Hot Creek State Wildlife Area
- Hot Sulphur Springs State Wildlife Area - Byers Canyon Rifle Range
- Hot Sulphur Springs State Wildlife Area - Jenny Williams
- Hot Sulphur Springs State Wildlife Area - Joe Gerrans
- Hot Sulphur Springs State Wildlife Area - Lone Buck
- Hot Sulphur Springs State Wildlife Area - Parshall Divide Unit
- Hot Sulphur Springs State Wildlife Area - Paul Gilbert Fishing Area
- Hot Sulphur Springs State Wildlife Area - Pioneer Park
- Huerfano State Wildlife Area
- Hugo State Wildlife Area
- Indian Run State Wildlife Area
- Jackson Lake State Wildlife Area
- James M. John State Wildlife Area
- James Mark Jones State Wildlife Area
- Jean K. Tool State Wildlife Area
- Jensen State Wildlife Area
- Jerry Creek Reservoirs State Wildlife Area Number 1
- Jerry Creek Reservoirs State Wildlife Area Number 2
- Jim Olterman/Lone Cone State Wildlife Area
- Joe Moore Reservoir State Wildlife Area
- John Martin Reservoir State Wildlife Area
- Johnson Village State Wildlife Area
- Julesburg State Wildlife Area (Julesburg and Ovid leases)
- Jumbo Reservoir State Wildlife Area
- Jumping Cow State Wildlife Area
- Junction Butte State Wildlife Area
- Karney Ranch State Wildlife Area
- Karval Reservoir State Wildlife Area
- Kemp - Breeze State Wildlife Area
- Kinney Lake State Wildlife Area
- Knight-Imler State Wildlife Area
- Knudson State Wildlife Area
- Kodak Watchable Wildlife Area
- La Jara Reservoir State Wildlife Area
- La Jara State Wildlife Area
- Lake Beckwith State Wildlife Area
- Lake Dorothey State Wildlife Area
- Lake Fork Gunnison State Wildlife Area
- Lake John State Wildlife Area
- Las Animas State Fish Unit
- Leaps Gulch State Wildlife Area
- Leatha Jean Stassen State Wildlife Area
- Little Snake State Wildlife Area
- Loma Boat Launch State Wildlife Area
- Lon Hagler State Wildlife Area
- Lone Dome State Wildlife Area
- Love Meadow Watchable Wildlife Area
- Lowell Ponds State Wildlife Area
- Manville State Wildlife Area (fishing lease)
- Mason Family State Wildlife Area (formerly Cebolla Creek State Wildlife Area)
- McCluskey State Wildlife Area
- Meeker Pasture State Wildlife Area
- Melon Valley State Wildlife Area
- Messex State Wildlife Area
- Middle Taylor Creek State Wildlife Area
- Mike Higbee State Wildlife Area
- Miller Ranch State Wildlife Area
- Mitani-Tokuyasu State Wildlife Area
- Mogensen Ponds State Wildlife Area
- Mount Evans State Wildlife Area
- Mount Ouray State Wildlife Area
- Mount Shavano State Wildlife Area and State Fish Unit (state fish hatchery)
- Mount Werner State Wildlife Area (fishing easement)

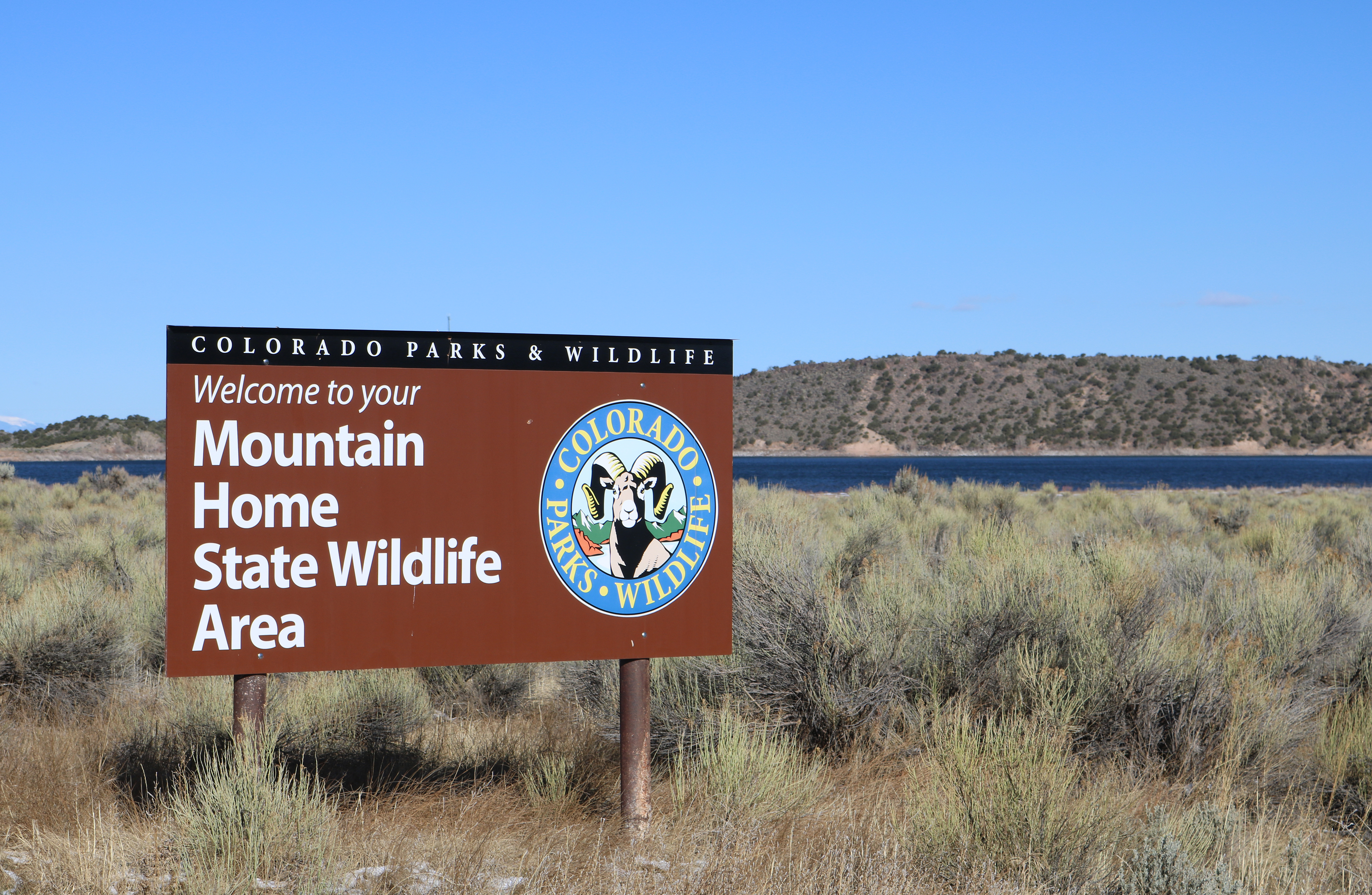
Mountain Home Reservoir State Wildlife Area.

- Mountain Home Reservoir State Wildlife Area
- Murphy State Wildlife Area (fishing lease)
- Nakagawa State Wildlife Area
- Narraguinnep Reservoir State Wildlife Area
- Narrows State Wildlife Area
- North Fork State Wildlife Area
- North Lake State Wildlife Area
- Oak Ridge State Wildlife Area
- Odd Fellows State Wildlife Area (fishing lease)
- Ogden-Treat State Wildlife Area
- Orchard Mesa State Wildlife Area
- Overland Trail State Wildlife Area
- Owl Mountain State Wildlife Area
- Oxbow State Wildlife Area
- Paddock State Wildlife Area
- Parachute Ponds State Wildlife Area
- Parvin Lake State Wildlife Area
- Pastorius Reservoir State Wildlife Area
- Perins Peak State Wildlife Area
- Piceance State Wildlife Area - Little Hills Unit
- Piceance State Wildlife Area - North Ridge Unit
- Piceance State Wildlife Area - Square S Ranch Unit
- Piceance State Wildlife Area - Square S Summer Range
- Piceance State Wildlife Area - Yellow Creek
- Pikes Peak State Wildlife Area (Bison Reservoir)
- Pitkin State Fish Unit (state fish hatchery)
- Plateau Creek State Wildlife Area
- Playa Blanca State Wildlife Area
- Pony Express State Wildlife Area
- Poudre River State Fish Unit (state fish hatchery)
- Poudre River State Wildlife Area
- Prewitt Reservoir State Wildlife Area

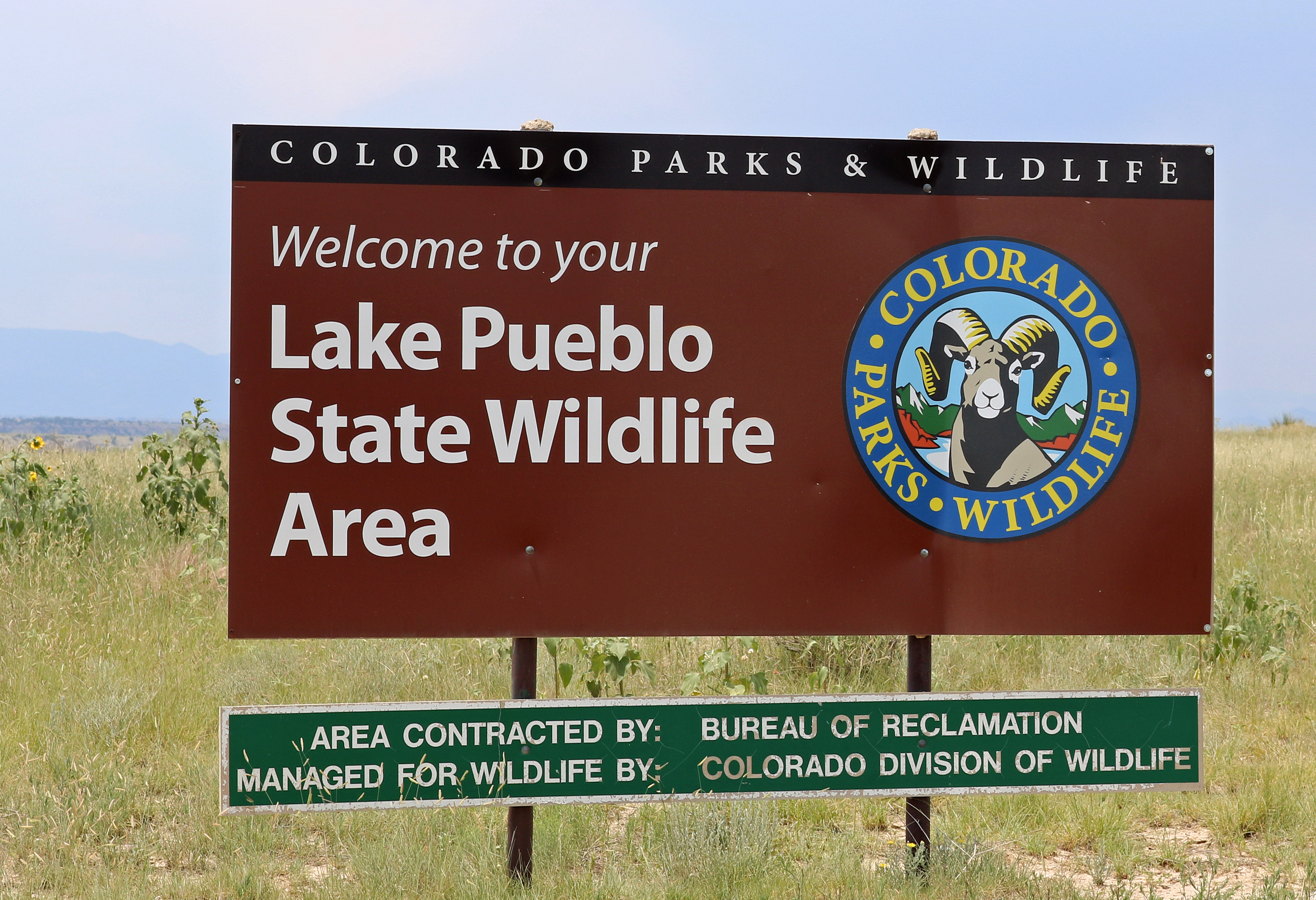
Pueblo Reservoir State Wildlife Area.

- Pueblo Reservoir State Wildlife Area
- Pueblo State Fish Unit (Hatchery)
- Puett Reservoir State Wildlife Area
- Purgatoire River State Wildlife Area
- Queens State Wildlife Area

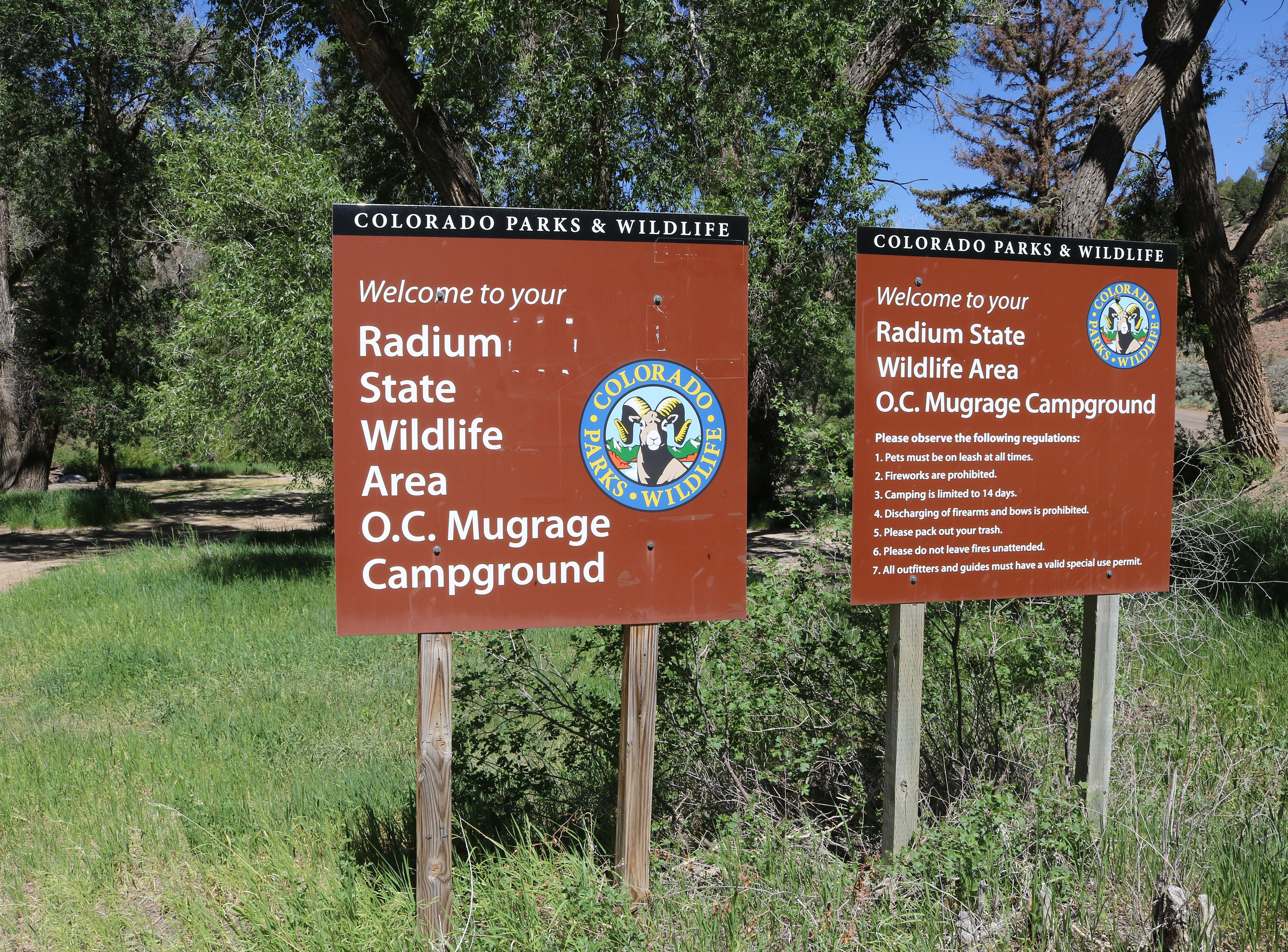
Radium State Wildlife Area.

- Radium State Wildlife Area
- Ralston Creek State Wildlife Area
- Ramah State Wildlife Area
- Red Dog State Wildlife Area
- Red Lion State Wildlife Area
- Red Mountain State Wildlife Area
- Reddy State Wildlife Area
- Richard State Wildlife Area
- Rifle Falls State Fish Unit (state fish hatchery)

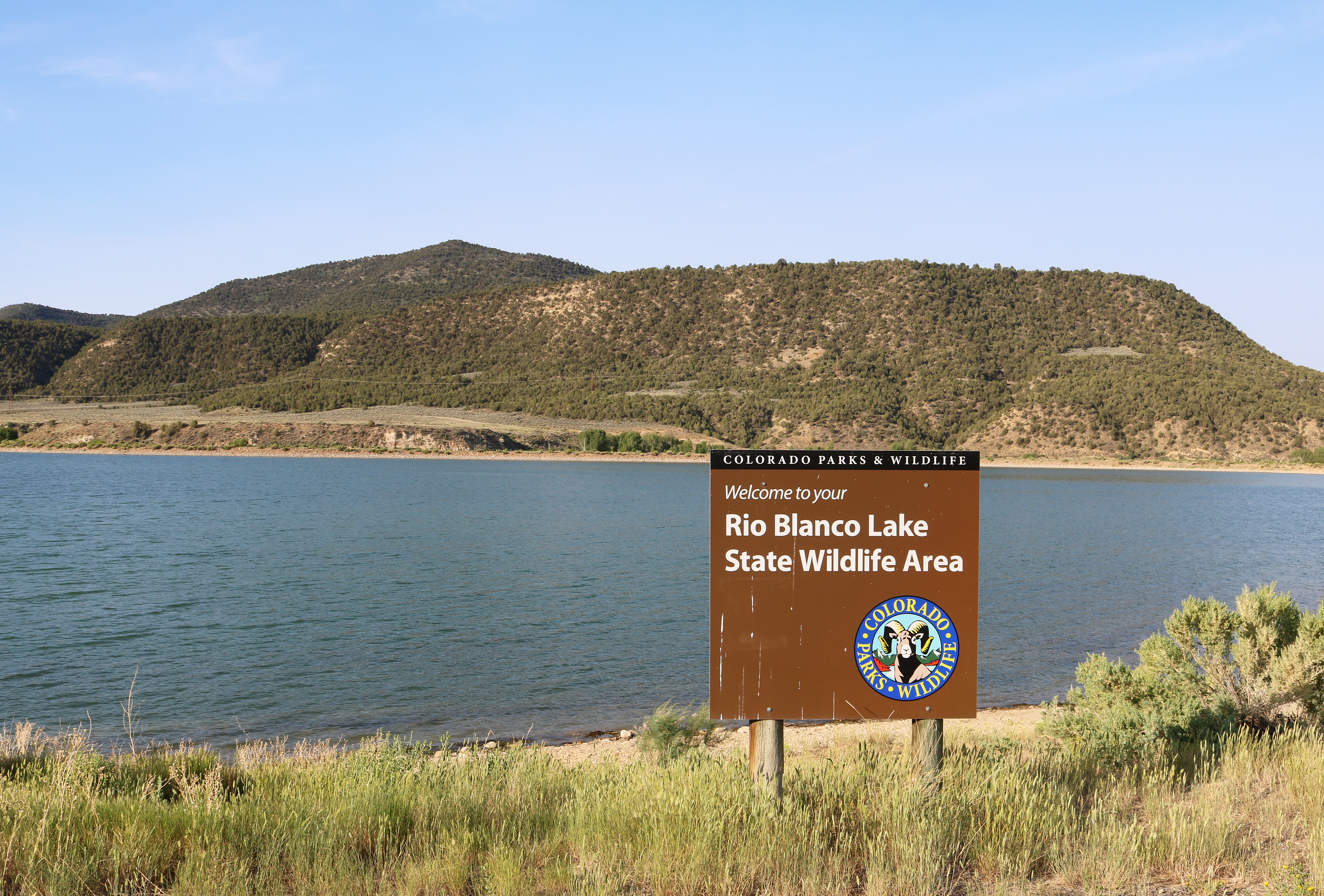
Rio Blanco Lake State Wildlife Area.

- Rio Blanco Lake State Wildlife Area
- Rio Grande River State Wildlife Area (Del Norte fishing easement)
- Rio Grande State Wildlife Area
- Rito Hondo Reservoir State Wildlife Area
- Road Canyon Reservoir State Wildlife Area
- Roaring Fork State Wildlife Area - Burry Parcel
- Roaring Fork State Wildlife Area - Gianinetti Parcel
- Roaring Fork State Wildlife Area - Wheeler/Dag Parcels
- Roaring Judy State Fish Unit (state fish hatchery)
- Rock Creek State Wildlife Area
- Rocky Ford State Wildlife Area
- Roeber State Wildlife Area
- Rosemont Reservoir State Wildlife Area
- Runyon / Fountain Lakes State Wildlife Area

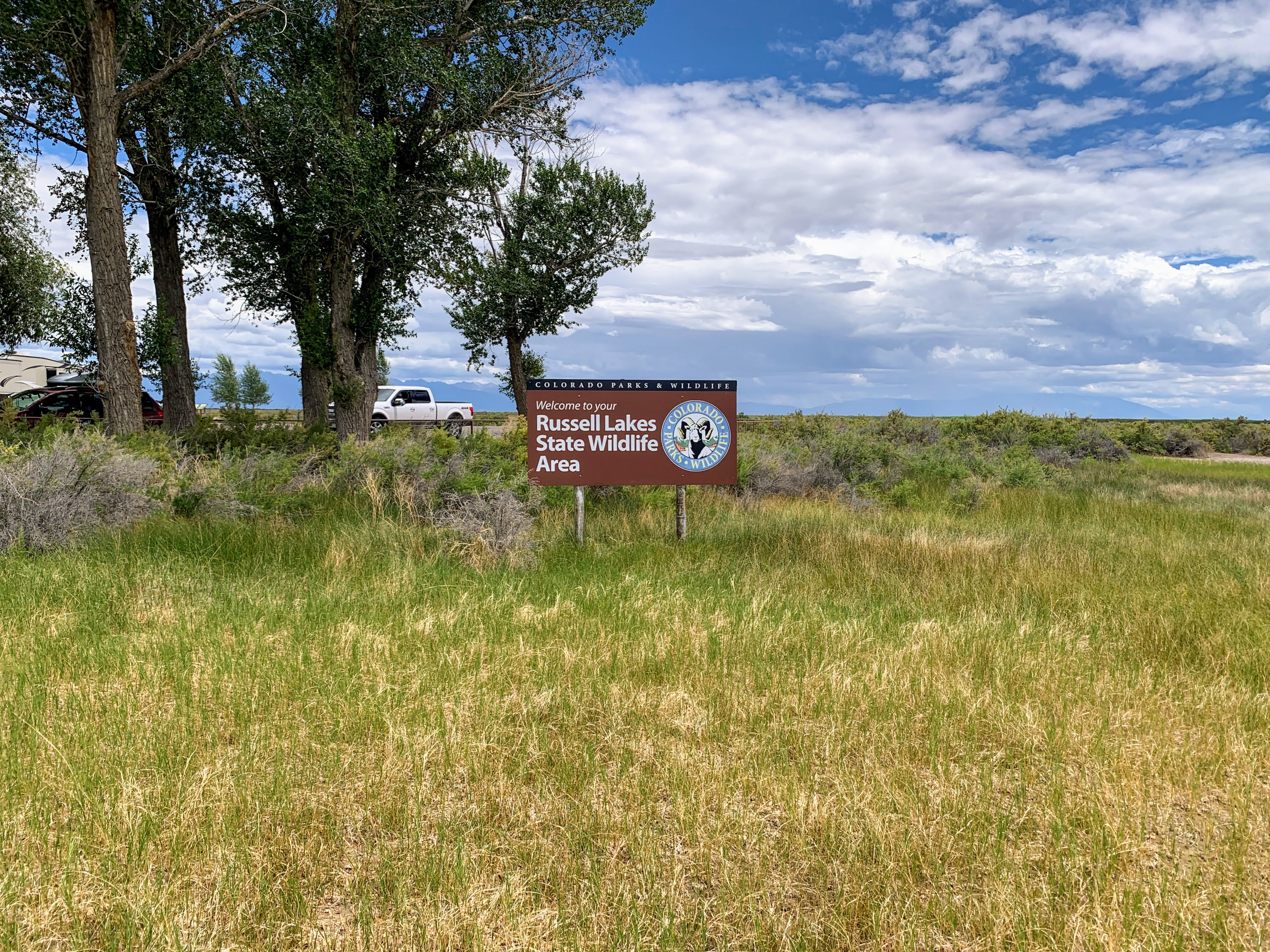
Russell Lakes State Wildlife Area.

- Russell Lakes State Wildlife Area (Russell Lakes National Natural Landmark)
- San Luis Lakes State Wildlife Area
- San Miguel State Wildlife Area

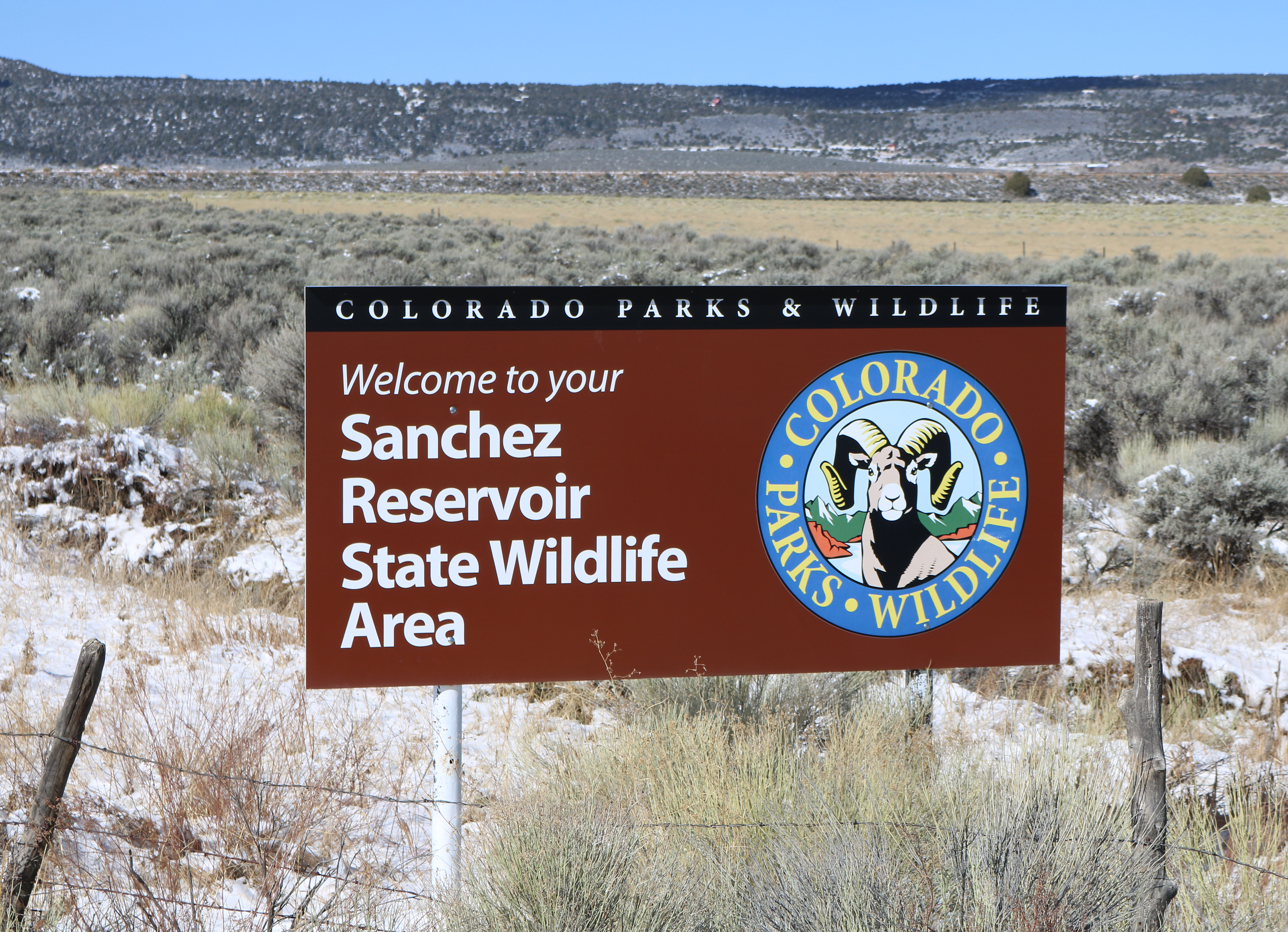
Sanchez Reservoir State Wildlife Area.

- Sanchez Reservoir State Wildlife Area
- Sand Draw State Wildlife Area
- Sands Lake State Wildlife Area
- Sandsage State Wildlife Area
- Sapinero State Wildlife Area
- Sarvis Creek State Wildlife Area
- Sawhill Ponds State Wildlife Area
- Sedgwick Bar State Wildlife Area
- Sego Springs State Wildlife Area
- Setchfield State Wildlife Area
- Seymour Lake State Wildlife Area
- Sharptail Ridge State Wildlife Area
- Shriver-Wright State Wildlife Area
- Simmons State Wildlife Area
- Simpson Ponds State Wildlife Area
- 63 Ranch State Wildlife Area
- Skaguay Reservoir State Wildlife Area
- Smith Lake State Wildlife Area at Wellington Reservoir Number 4
- Smith Reservoir State Wildlife Area
- Smyth State Wildlife Area (fishing lease)
- South Republican State Wildlife Area - Bonny Parcel
- South Republican State Wildlife Area - Kleweno Parcel
- Spanish Peaks State Wildlife Area
- Spinney Mountain State Wildlife Area
- Spring Creek Reservoir State Wildlife Area
- Stalker Lake State Wildlife Area
- Steamboat Springs State Wildlife Area (fishing easement)
- Storm Mountain Access Road
- Summit Reservoir State Wildlife Area
- Tamarack Ranch State Wildlife Area
- Tarryall Reservoir State Wildlife Area
- Taylor River State Wildlife Area

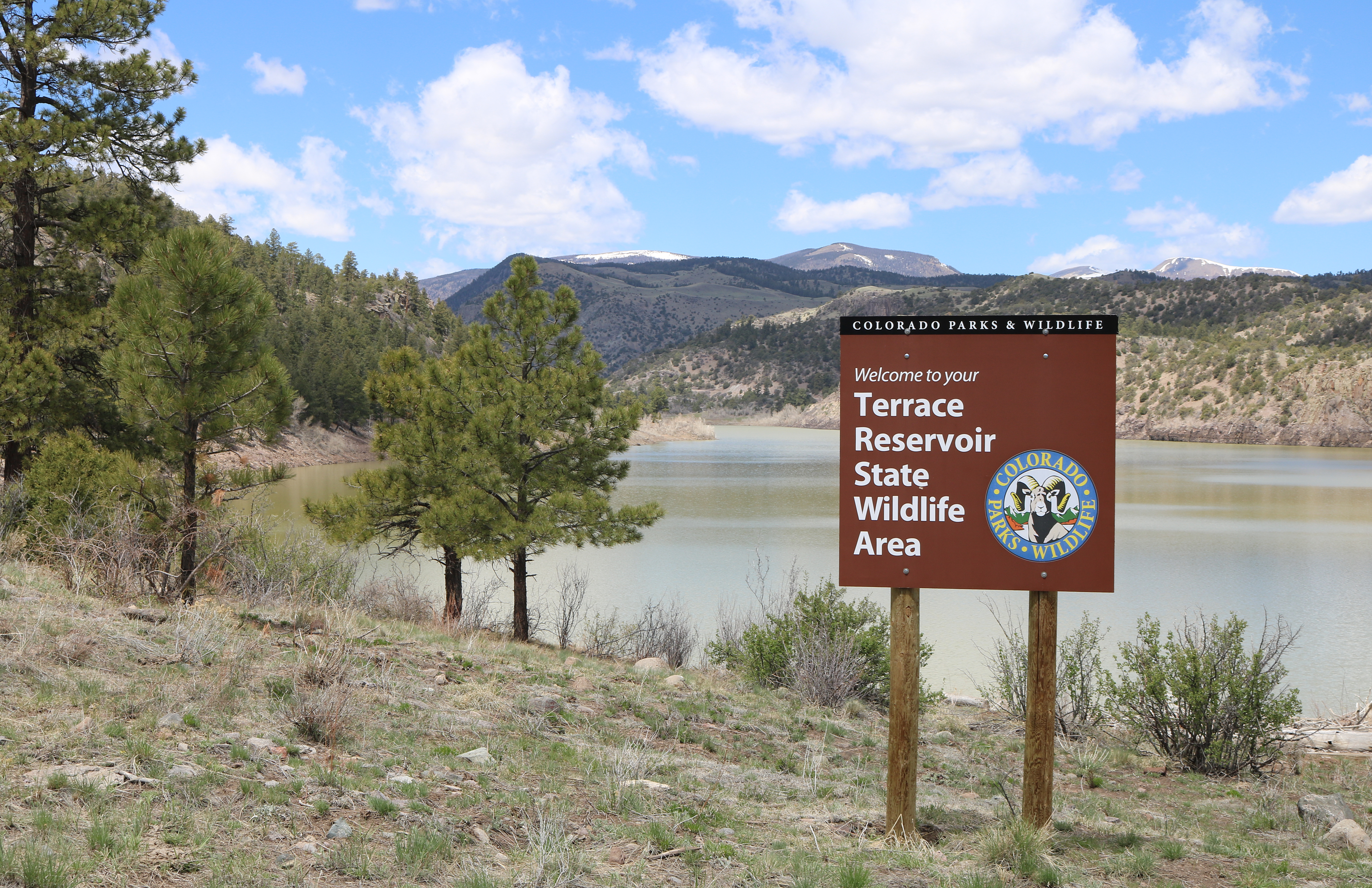
Terrace Reservoir State Wildlife Area.

- Terrace Reservoir State Wildlife Area
- Teter-Michigan Creek State Wildlife Area
- Thurston Reservoir State Wildlife Area
- Tilman Bishop State Wildlife Area
- Timpas Creek State Wildlife Area
- Tolland Ranch State Wildlife Area
- Tomahawk State Wildlife Area

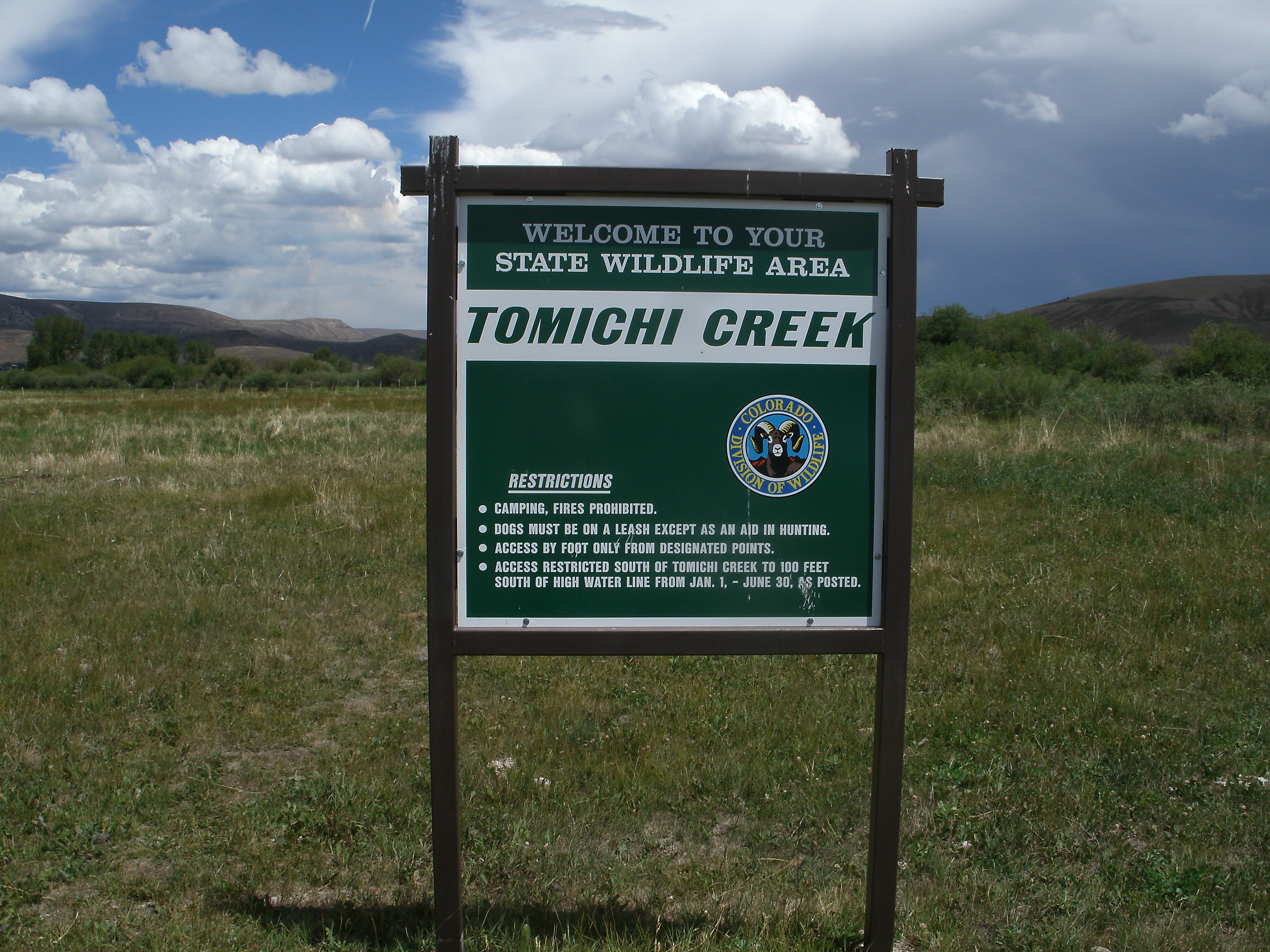
Tomichi Creek State Wildlife Area.

- Tomichi Creek State Wildlife Area
- Totten Reservoir State Wildlife Area
- Trujillo Meadows State Wildlife Area
- Turks Pond State Wildlife Area
- Twin Sisters State Wildlife Area

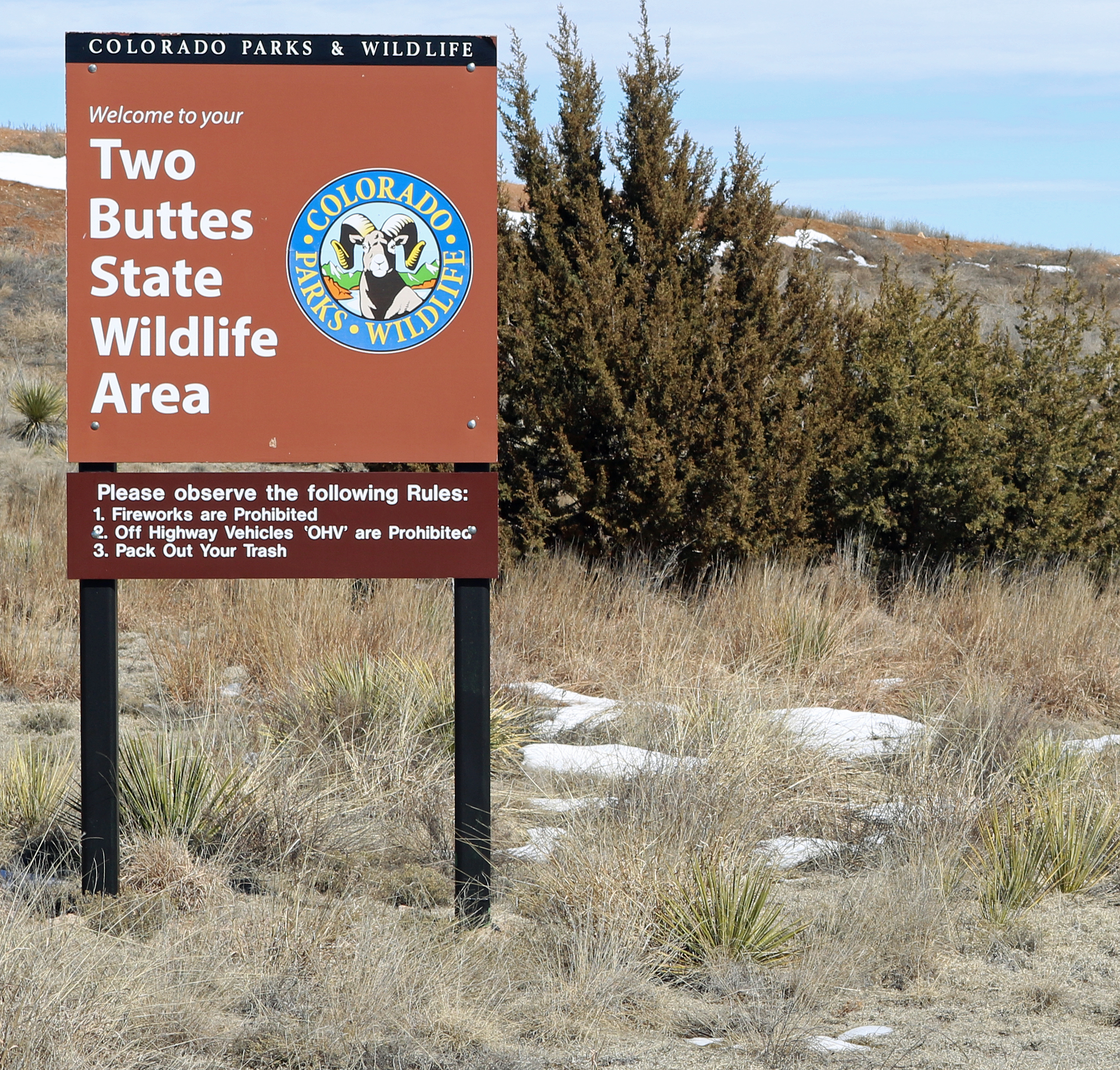
Two Buttes Reservoir State Wildlife Area.

- Two Buttes Reservoir State Wildlife Area
- Vail Deer Underpass State Wildlife Area
- Van Tuyl State Wildlife Area - Cabin Creek Parcel
- Van Tuyl State Wildlife Area - Lost Canyon Parcel
- Verner State Wildlife Area (fishing lease)
- Wahatoya State Wildlife Area, includes Daigre Lake
- Walker State Wildlife Area
- Ward Road Pond State Wildlife Area
- Watson Lake State Wildlife Area
- Waunita Watchable Wildlife Area
- Webster State Wildlife Area
- Wellington State Wildlife Area
- West Bank State Wildlife Area
- West Lake State Wildlife Area (Larimer County, Colorado)
- West Lake State Wildlife Area (Mesa County, Colorado)
- West Rifle Creek State Wildlife Area
- Wheeler State Wildlife Area
- Whitehorse State Wildlife Area
- Williams Creek Reservoir State Wildlife Area
- Willow Creek State Wildlife Area
- Windy Gap Watchable Wildlife Area
- Woods Lake State Wildlife Area
- Wray State Fish Unit (state fish hatchery)
- Wright's Lake State Wildlife Area
- Yampa River State Wildlife Area

Please see Colorado State Wildlife Areas for a current list of the state wildlife areas in Colorado.

== See also ==
- Colorado Department of Natural Resources
  - Colorado Parks and Wildlife
- Bibliography of Colorado
- Geography of Colorado
- History of Colorado
- Index of Colorado-related articles
- List of Colorado-related lists
- Outline of Colorado
