= Sangre de Cristo Creek =

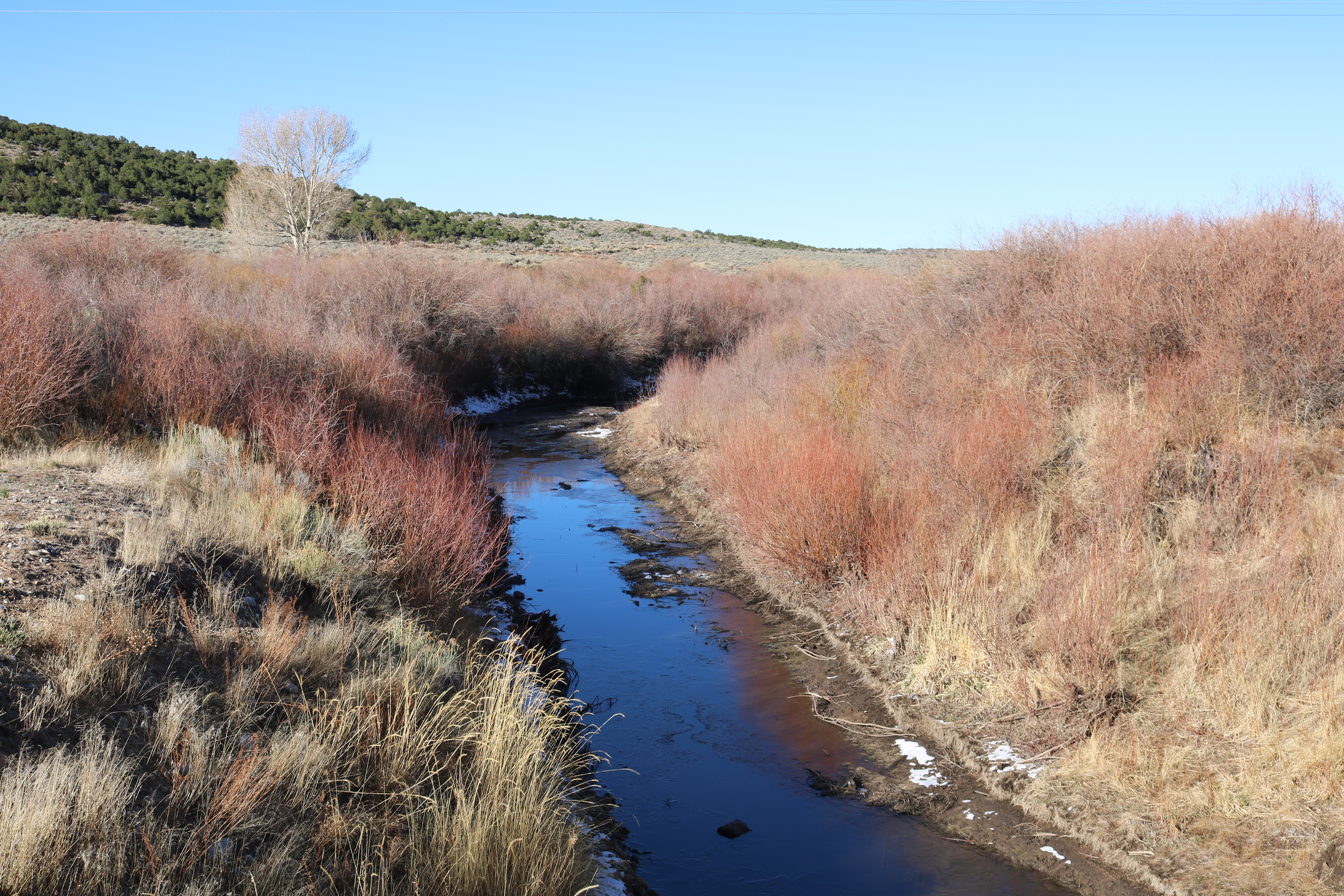
- The creek near Fort Garland, viewed from a bridge on Trinchera Ranch Road North.

Physical characteristics
- Source
  - location: La Veta Pass
  - coordinates: 37°36′56″N 105°11′35″W
- Mouth
  - location: Smith Reservoir
  - coordinates: 37°23′54″N 105°31′25″W
  - elevation: 7,730 feet (2,360 meters)

Basin features
- Progression: Trinchera Creek — Rio Grande

Sangre de Cristo Creek is a stream in Costilla County, Colorado. It starts atop La Veta Pass in the Sangre de Cristo Mountains. The creek flows alongside Highway 160 as it descends from the top of the pass into the San Luis Valley.

The creek's mouth is at Smith Reservoir, south of Blanca. Before the reservoir was built, the creek had a confluence here with Trinchera Creek, of which it is a tributary.

In 1879 there was a railroad accident on a grade above the creek, killing one person.
