= Cimarrona Peak =

American mountain in Colorado

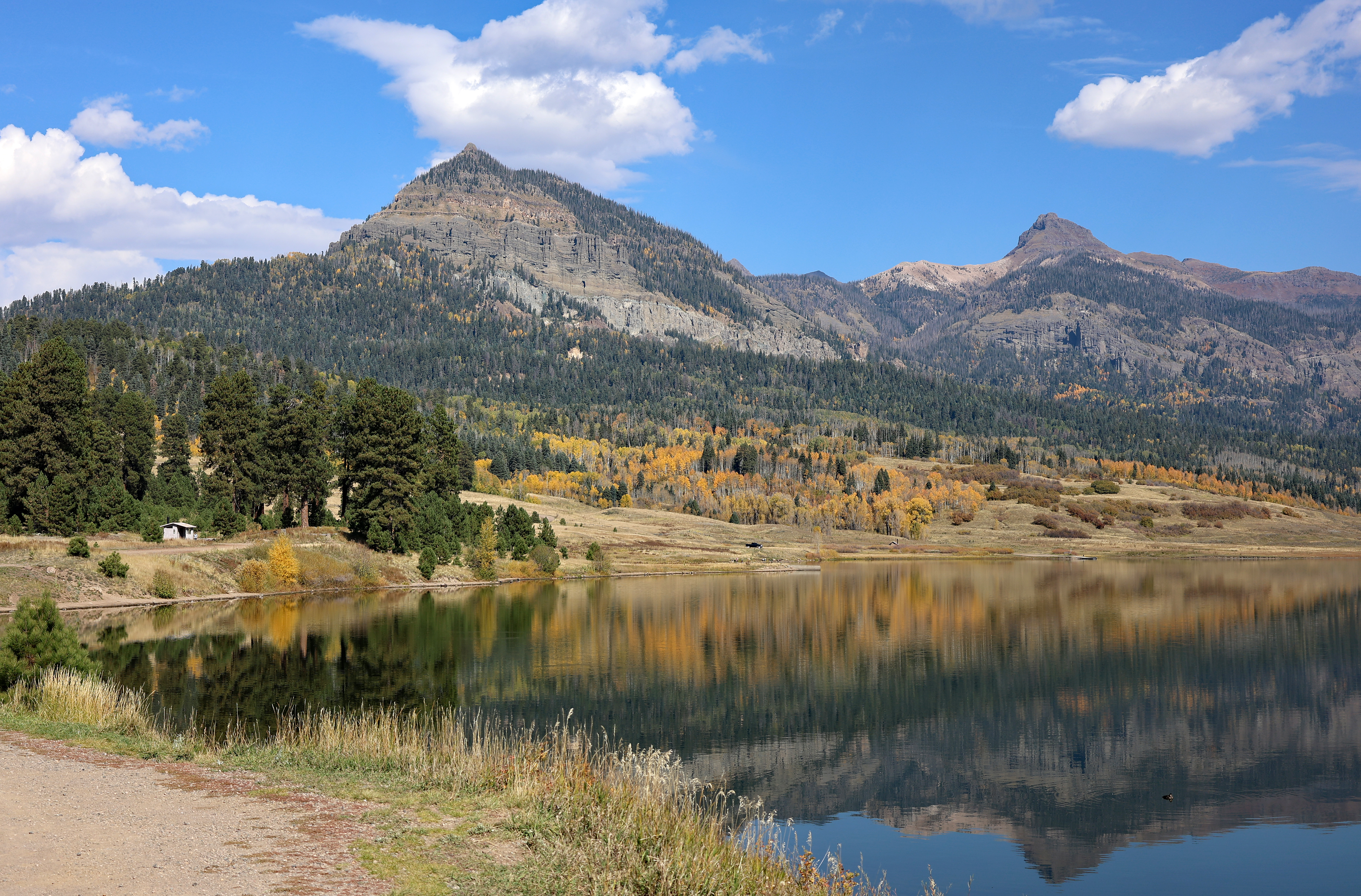
- The peak (right) in October 2024

Highest point
- Elevation: 3,831 m (12,569 ft)
- Prominence: 354 ft (108 m)
- Isolation: .86 mi (1.38 km)
- Coordinates: 37°34′42.04″N 107°13′25.72″W

Geography
- Location within Colorado
- Location: Hinsdale County, Colorado
- Country: United States
- State: Colorado
- County: Hinsdale
- National Forest: San Juan National Forest
- Wilderness Area: Weminuche Wilderness
- Parent range: San Juan Mountains of the Southern Rocky Mountains
- Topo map(s): USGS; Cimarrona Peak

Cimarrona Peak, elevation 12,570 feet (3,830 meters), is a summit in the San Juan Mountains in Hinsdale County, Colorado, four miles (6.4 kilometers) north of Williams Creek Reservoir. The mountain lies in the Weminuche Wilderness and the San Juan National Forest.

== Hiking ==
The out-and-back, 8.5-mile-long (13.7-kilometer) Cimarrona Trail passes along the northeast side of the peak and then continues north to the trail's junction with the Continental Divide Trail at Squaw Pass. The trail starts at a point north of Williams Creek Reservoir and enters the Weminuche Wilderness. A natural arch lies along its route.
