= Big Meadows Reservoir =

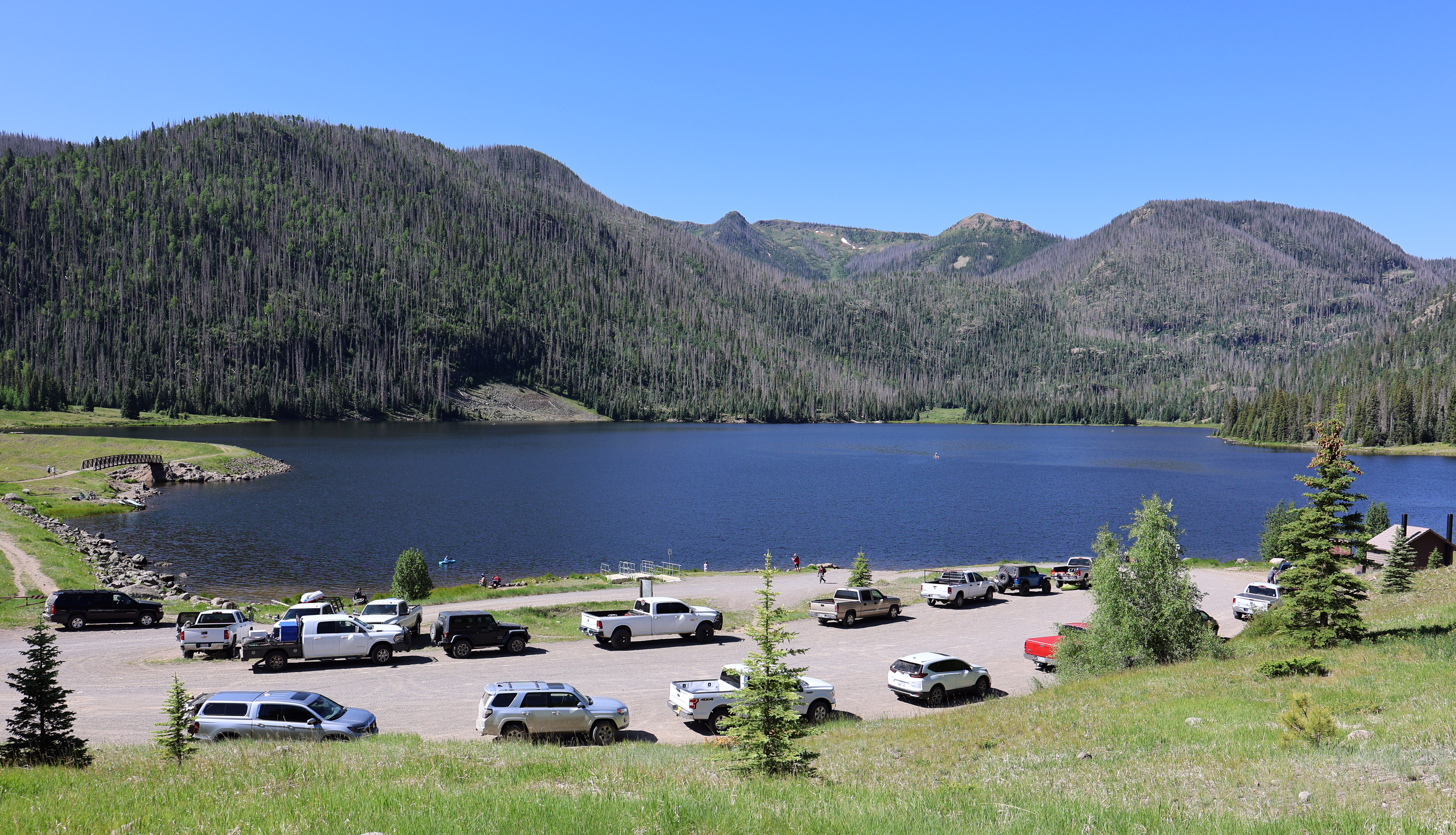
- The reservoir in 2025

- The reservoir's location in Colorado
- Location: Mineral County, Colorado, U.S.
- Coordinates: 37°32′13.43″N 106°48′15.55″W
- Type: reservoir
- Primary inflows: South Fork Rio Grande; Spruce Creek; Black Creek
- Primary outflows: South Fork Rio Grande
- Basin countries: United States
- Managing agency: Colorado Parks and Wildlife
- Designation: Big Meadows Reservoir State Wildlife Area
- Built: 1968
- Surface area: 117 acres (47 hectares)
- Water volume: 3,356 acre-feet (4,140,000 cubic meters)
- Surface elevation: 9,216 feet (2,809 meters)
- Frozen: Freezes in winter

Big Meadows Reservoir is in Mineral County, Colorado, U.S., southwest of South Fork and in the Rio Grande National Forest. The reservoir, which lies at an elevation of 9,216 feet (2,809 meters), was created to provide a fishing venue and is a Colorado state wildlife area. The reservoir is reached by taking Forest Service Road 410 for about two miles (3.2 km) off of U.S. Highway 160 on the east side of Wolf Creek Pass.

== Dams ==
The reservoir has two dams. A spillway is between the two dams, as is a rocky area that functions as a dam. A hiking trail goes over both dams, and a footbridge carries hikers over the spillway. The Big Meadows Main Dam, NID ID CO00764, is a 69-foot (21-meter) high earthen dam that can store up to 3,356 acre-feet (4,140,000 cubic meters) of water. It was built in 1968 and is 1,060 feet (320 meters) wide. The Big Meadows - North Dike, NID ID CO02869, is a 15-foot (4.6-meter) high earthen dam. It was built in 1968 and is 300 feet (91 meters) wide. Both dams and the reservoir are owned by Colorado Parks and Wildlife.

== State wildlife area ==
The lake makes up the Big Meadows Reservoir State Wildlife Area. Fishing is the wildlife area's chief activity. The reservoir covers 117 surface acres (47 ha) and has a boat ramp. Anglers catch brook trout, rainbow trout, salmon, and German brown trout. The United States Forest Service operates the Big Meadows Campground and Picnic Area, which is adjacent to the reservoir.
