= Brush Hollow Reservoir =

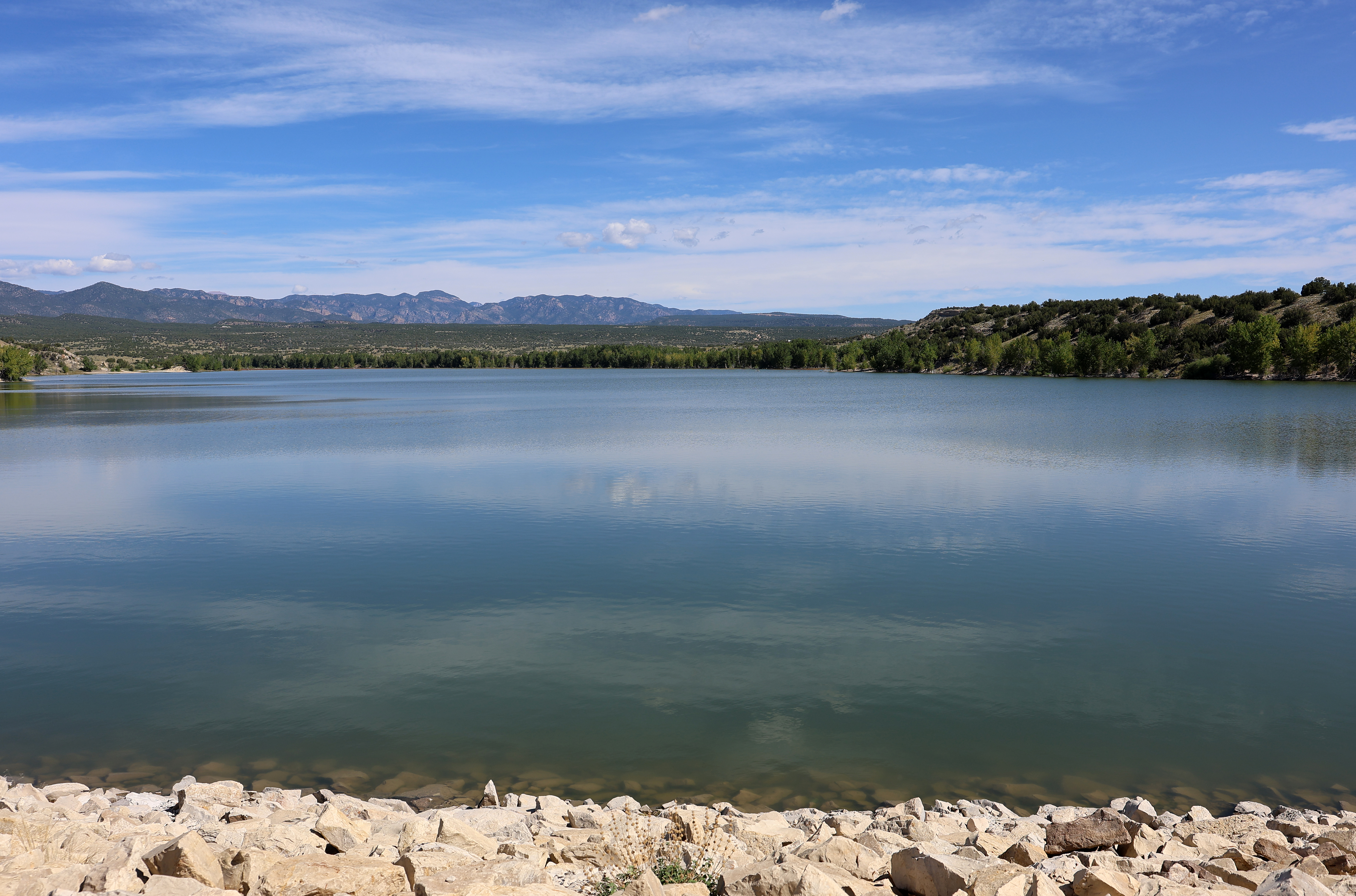
- The reservoir in 2025

- Location within Colorado
- Location: Brush Hollow State Wildlife Area, Fremont County, Colorado
- Coordinates: 38.462°N 105.052°W
- Type: reservoir
- River sources: Brush Hollow Creek; Brush Hollow Supply Ditch
- Primary outflows: Brush Hollow Creek
- Designation: Brush Hollow State Wildlife Area

Brush Hollow Reservoir is located in Brush Hollow State Wildlife Area, northwest of Penrose, Colorado, in Fremont County.

== Dam ==
Brush Hollow Dam, NID ID CO00458, is a 90-foot (27-meter) high earthen dam that can store up to 5,071 acre-feet (6,255,000 cubic meters) of water. It was built in 1922 and is 874 feet (266 meters) wide. The dam and reservoir are owned by Sonny Daniels.
