= Beaver Creek (Arkansas River tributary) =

River in Colorado, United States

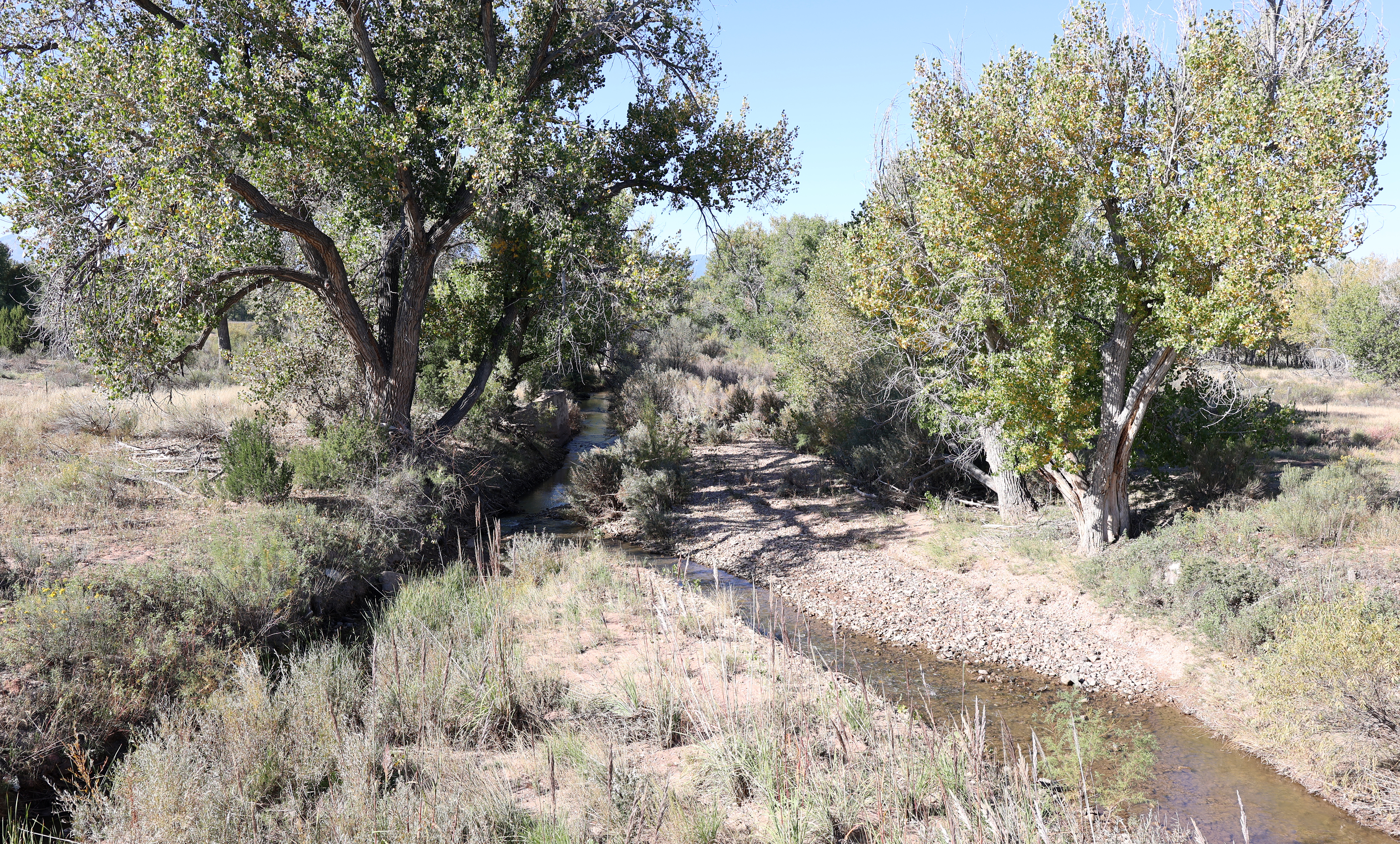
- Looking downstream from a bridge on Fremont County Road 120

- Location of the creek's mouth in Colorado

Physical characteristics
- Source
  - location: Fremont County, Colorado
  - coordinates: 38°35′57.98″N 105°1′22.93″W
- Mouth
  - location: Arkansas River
  - coordinates: 38°22′18″N 104°58′4.94″W
  - elevation: 4,981 feet (1,518 meters)
- Length: 22 miles (35 kilometers)

Basin features
- Progression: Arkansas → Mississippi
- Tributaries
  - left: East Beaver Creek; Red Creek
  - right: West Beaver Creek; West Mill Creek

Beaver Creek is a tributary of the Arkansas River in Fremont County in south central Colorado. The creek is a coldwater stream popular with anglers.

== Course ==
The creek rises at the confluence of West Beaver Creek and East Beaver Creek within the Beaver Creek State Wildlife Area in the mountains north of Penrose, Colorado. This area is also within the Beaver Creek Wilderness Study area. From here, the creek flows generally south, passing under Colorado State Highway 115, then traveling south just east of Penrose, Colorado to its confluence with the Arkansas River, its flow much decreased by ditch diversions, chiefly the Brush Hollow Supply Ditch.

== Fishing ==
The State Wildlife Area offers fishing for brown trout, brook trout, and rainbow trout. There are few roads in the area, and hiking up the stream is the only way to access the best fishing sites.

== See also ==
- List of rivers of Colorado
