= San Luis Southern Railway Trestle =

- U.S. National Register of Historic Places
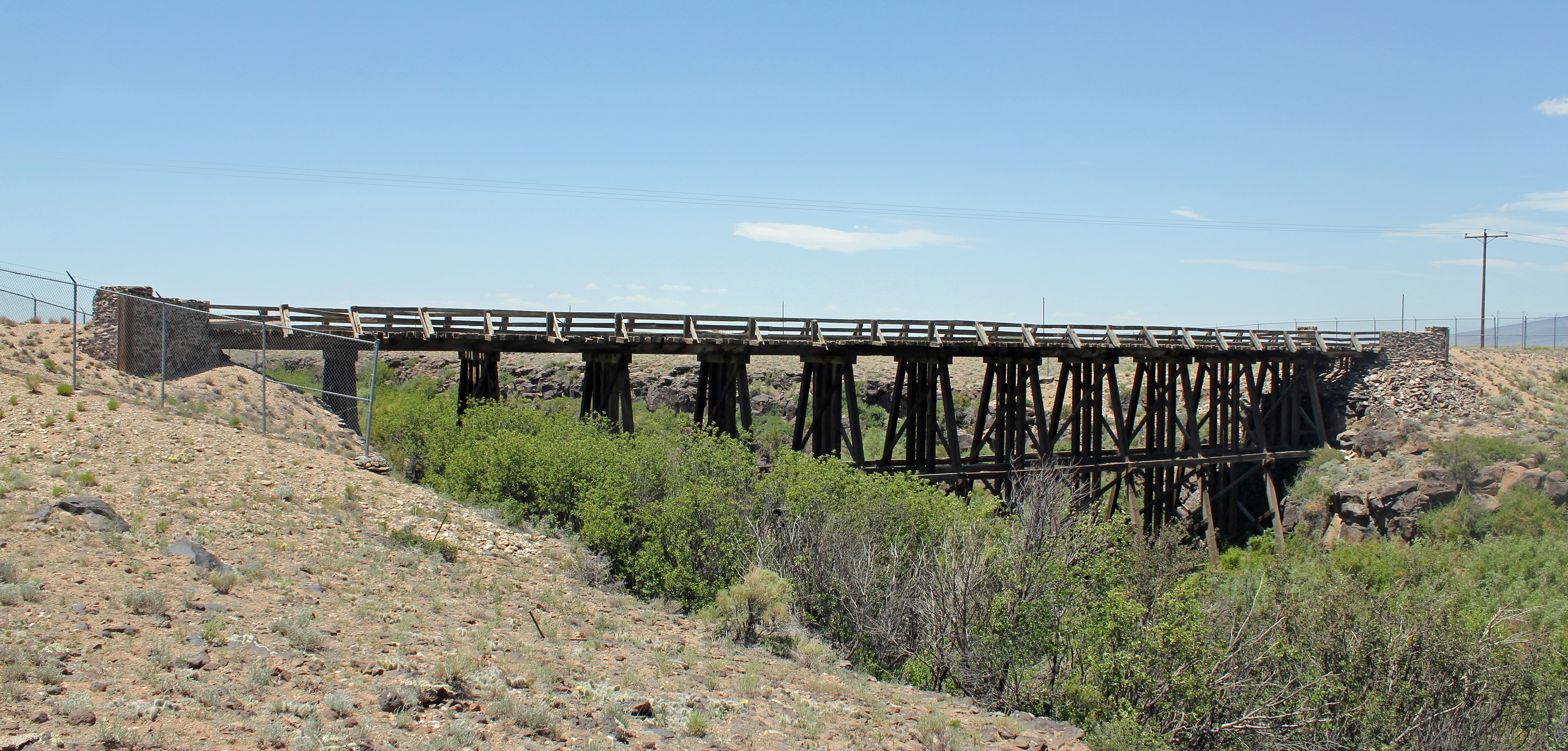

- Location within Colorado
- Nearest city: Blanca, Colorado
- Coordinates: 37°23′12″N 105°32′51″W An abandoned section of Costilla County Road 12 37°23′12″N 105°32′51″W
- Area: 0.4 acres (0.16 ha)
- Built: 1910
- Built by: San Luis Southern Railway Company
- Architectural style: Railroad Trestle
- MPS: Railroads in Colorado, 1858-1948 MPS
- NRHP reference No.: 03001361
- Added to NRHP: January 6, 2004

The San Luis Southern Railway Trestle, in Costilla County, Colorado near Blanca, Colorado, was built in 1910. It was listed on the National Register of Historic Places in 2004.

It is a railroad trestle built by the Southern San Luis Valley Railroad.

It is a 190 feet (58 m) long structure spanning Trinchera Creek's Rattlesnake Gulch (or Rattlesnake Canyon).
