= Brush Hollow State Wildlife Area =

Protected area in Colorado, United States

Coordinates: 38.465°N 105.052°W

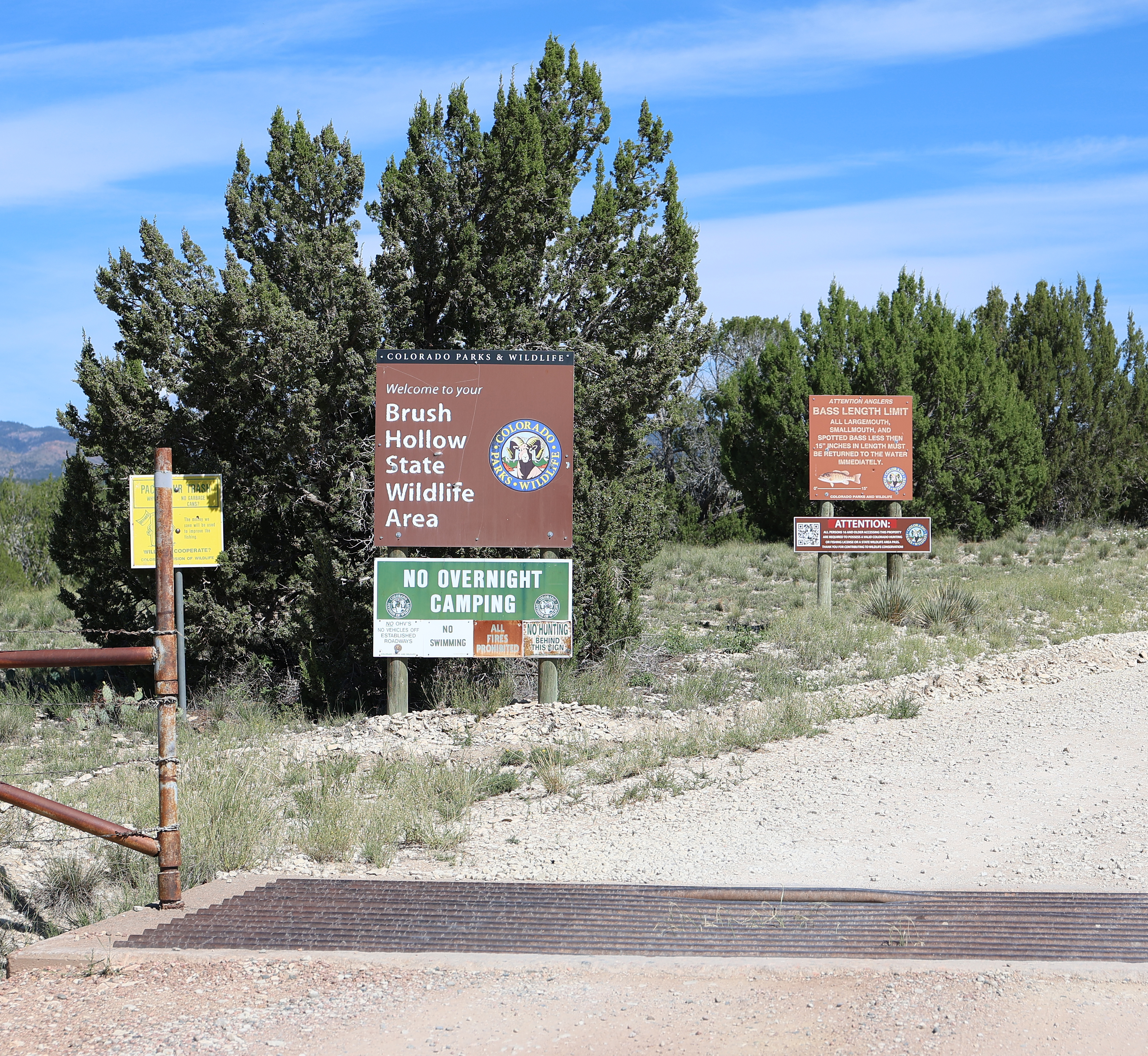
The wildlife area's entrance

Brush Hollow State Wildlife Area is located west of Penrose, Colorado and north of Fremont County Road 123, the highway that connects Penrose and Cañon City, Colorado. It is centered on Brush Hollow Reservoir.

The Brush Hollow State Wildlife Area occupies an area of approximately 400 acres (160 hectares). It ranges in elevation from 5,448 feet (1,661 meters) above sea level to 5,608 feet (1,709 meters). Hunting is prohibited in the area, although permits for fishing are issued. The lake in the area has rainbow trout, largemouth bass, walleye, bluegill and channel catfish. The area is a popular place for birdwatching and wildlife viewing.
