= Sanchez Reservoir =

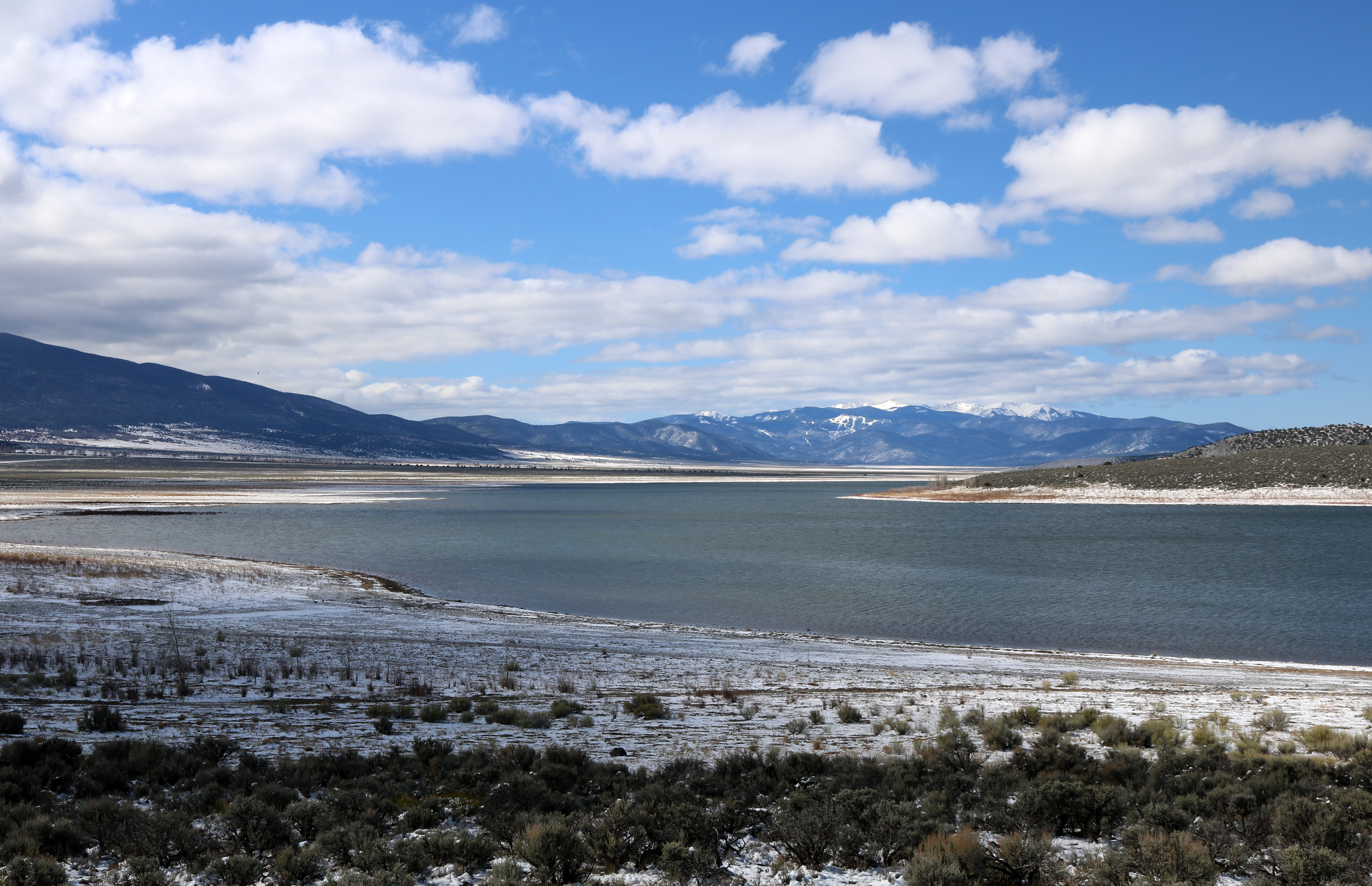
- Looking south across the reservoir.

- Location in Colorado
- Location: Costilla County, Colorado
- Coordinates: 37°05′02″N 105°24′52″W
- Type: reservoir
- Primary inflows: Ventero Creek; Sanchez Canal
- Basin countries: United States
- Managing agency: Sanchez Ditch and Reservoir Company
- Designation: Sanchez Reservoir State Wildlife Area
- Built: 1912
- First flooded: 1912
- Surface area: 3,145 acres (1,273 hectares)
- Water volume: 103,000 acre-feet (127,000,000 cubic meters)
- Surface elevation: 2,518 meters (8,261 feet)

Sanchez Reservoir lies in far southcentral Colorado, west of the Sangre de Cristo Mountains in Costilla County. Its inflows include Ventero Creek and the Sanchez Canal, a diversion canal that takes water from Culebra Creek and two other creeks.

== Dam ==
The reservoir's earthen dam was built in 1912. Because the dam leaks a lot and because of ongoing drought in the region, the reservoir never really reaches its full capacity.

== Fishing ==
Colorado Parks and Wildlife manages fishing at the reservoir, which forms the Sanchez Reservoir State Wildlife Area. However, the Colorado Department of Public Health and Environment has issued a "Fish consumption advisory," warning of unsafe mercury levels in northern pike and walleye caught in the lake.
