= Mountain Home Reservoir =

Reservoir in Costilla County, Colorado, United States

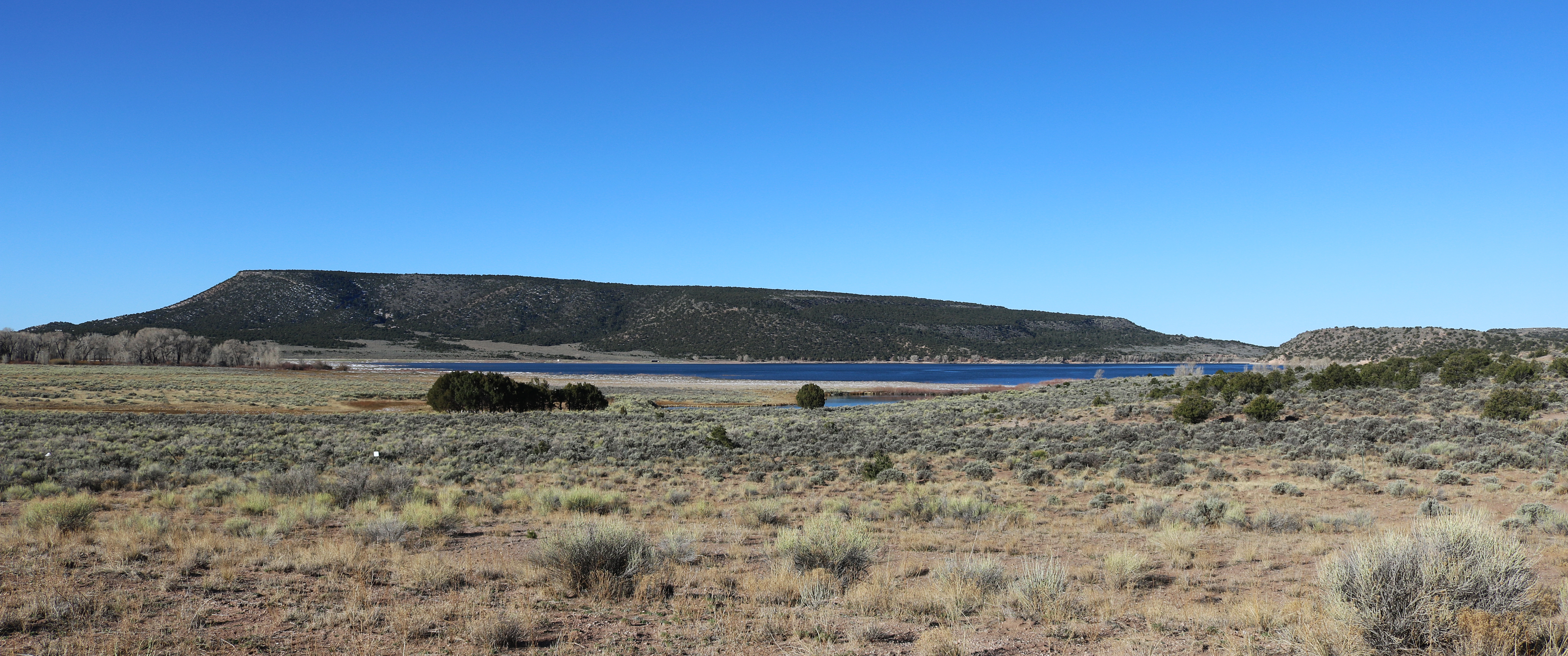
- The reservoir from County Lane 6.

- Location in Colorado
- Location: Costilla County, Colorado
- Coordinates: 37°23′38″N 105°23′12″W
- Type: reservoir
- Primary inflows: Trinchera Creek
- Primary outflows: Trinchera Creek
- Basin countries: United States
- Managing agency: The Trinchera Irrigation Company
- Designation: Mountain Home Reservoir State Wildlife Area
- Built: 1912
- First flooded: 1913
- Water volume: 19,500 acre-feet (24,100,000 cubic meters)
- Surface elevation: 2,483 meters (8,146 feet)

Mountain Home Reservoir is a reservoir and state wildlife area in Costilla County, Colorado, near Fort Garland. Frozen in winter, the reservoir lies at 2,483 meters (8,146 feet) elevation on the western slope of the Culebra Range of the Sangre de Cristo Mountains in southern Colorado.

The reservoir impounds Trinchera Creek and lies near the Trinchera Ranch and Sangre de Cristo Ranches subdivisions.

== Dam ==
The dam, NID ID# CO00818, is a 153-foot (47-meter) high earthen dam that can store up to 26,230 acre-feet (32,350,000 cubic meters) of water. It was built in 1912–1913, but at least one source says it was built in 1908.

== State wildlife area ==
The reservoir is the site of the Mountain Home Reservoir State Wildlife Area, managed by Colorado Parks and Wildlife. Among the species of fish anglers can catch in the reservoir is northern pike.
