= Smith Reservoir (Costilla County, Colorado) =

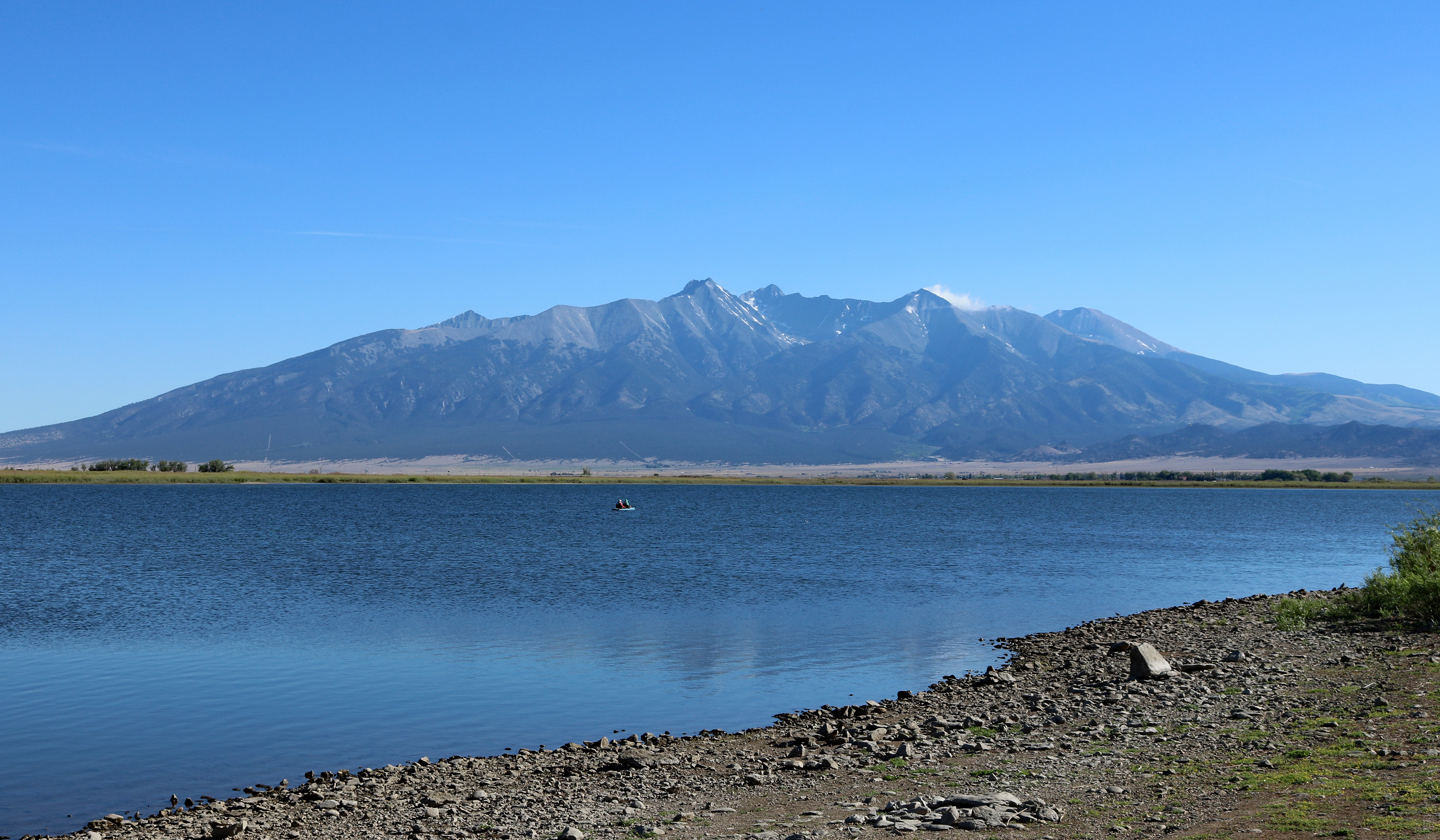
- Looking across the reservoir towards Blanca Peak

- Location in Colorado
- Location: Costilla County, Colorado
- Coordinates: 37°23′34″N 105°31′50″W
- Type: reservoir
- Primary inflows: Trinchera Creek; Sangre de Cristo Creek; Ute Creek and several other smaller creeks
- Primary outflows: Trinchera Creek
- Managing agency: Trinchera Irrigation Company
- Designation: Smith Reservoir State Wildlife Area
- Built: 1914
- Water volume: 14,058 acre⋅ft (17,340,000 m^{3})
- Surface elevation: 7,716 ft (2,352 m)
- Frozen: Freezes in winter

Smith Reservoir is located in Costilla County, Colorado, south of Blanca in the San Luis Valley. The reservoir is owned by the Trinchera Irrigation Company.

== Dam ==
The rockfill dam, Smith Dam, was built in 1914 and — according to the National Inventory of Dams — stores 14,058 acre⋅ft (17,340,000 m^{3}) of water. It impounds Trinchera Creek. Sangre de Cristo Creek and several smaller creeks also flow into the reservoir; prior to the reservoir's construction, Sangre de Cristo Creek had its confluence with Trinchera Creek here.

== State wildlife area ==
The lake and the land immediately surrounding it are also designated as the Smith Reservoir State Wildlife Area. It offers trout fishing, waterfowl hunting, and camping.
