= Terrace Reservoir =

- Alamosa River Reservoir
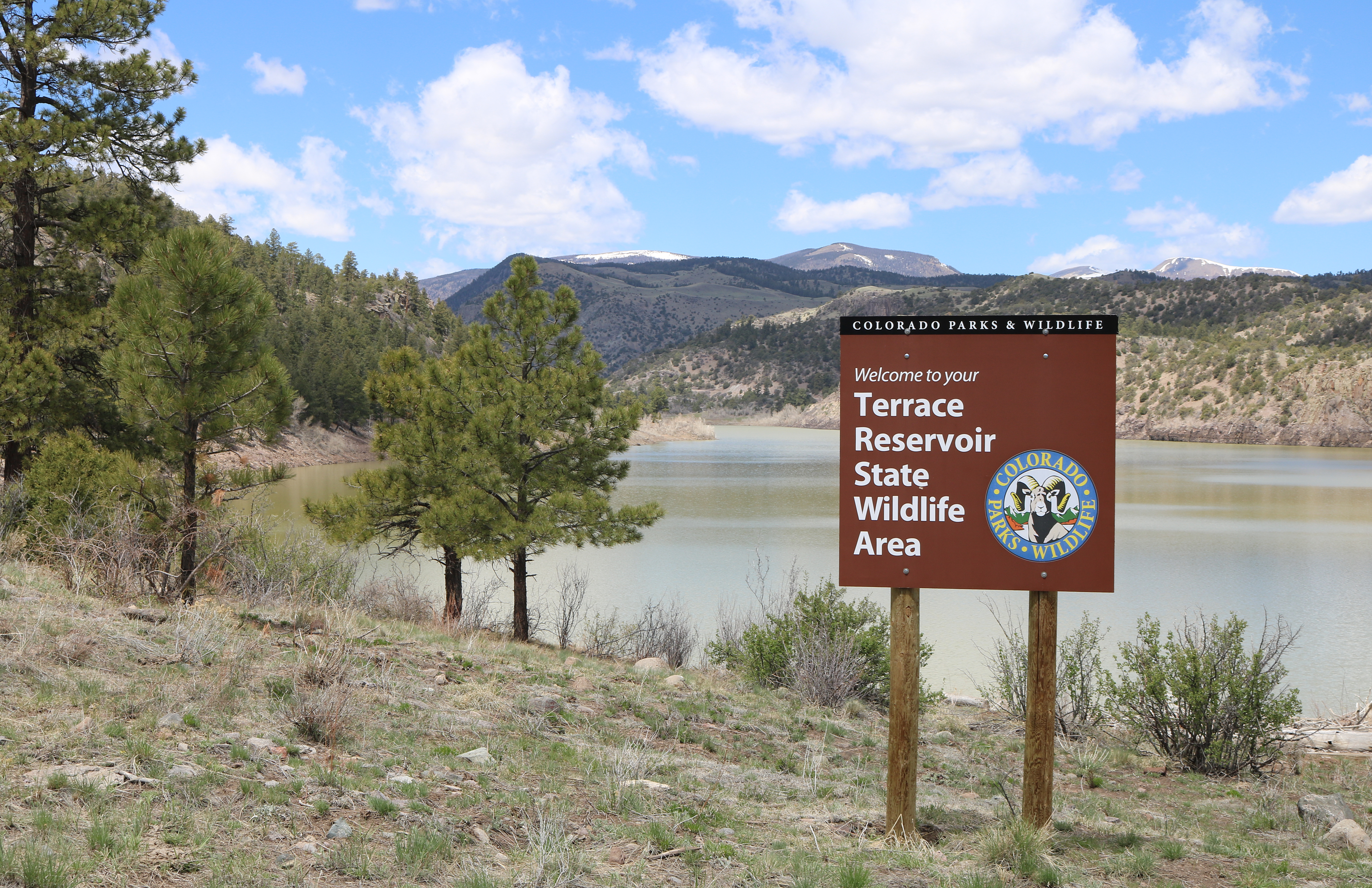
- A view from near the top of the dam

- Location in Colorado
- Location: Conejos County, Colorado
- Coordinates: 37°21′47″N 106°17′39″W
- Type: reservoir
- Primary inflows: Alamosa River
- Primary outflows: Alamosa River
- Designation: Terrace Reservoir State Wildlife Area
- Built: 1912
- Water volume: 19,195 acre-feet (23,677,000 cubic meters)
- Surface elevation: 8,530 feet (2,600 meters)

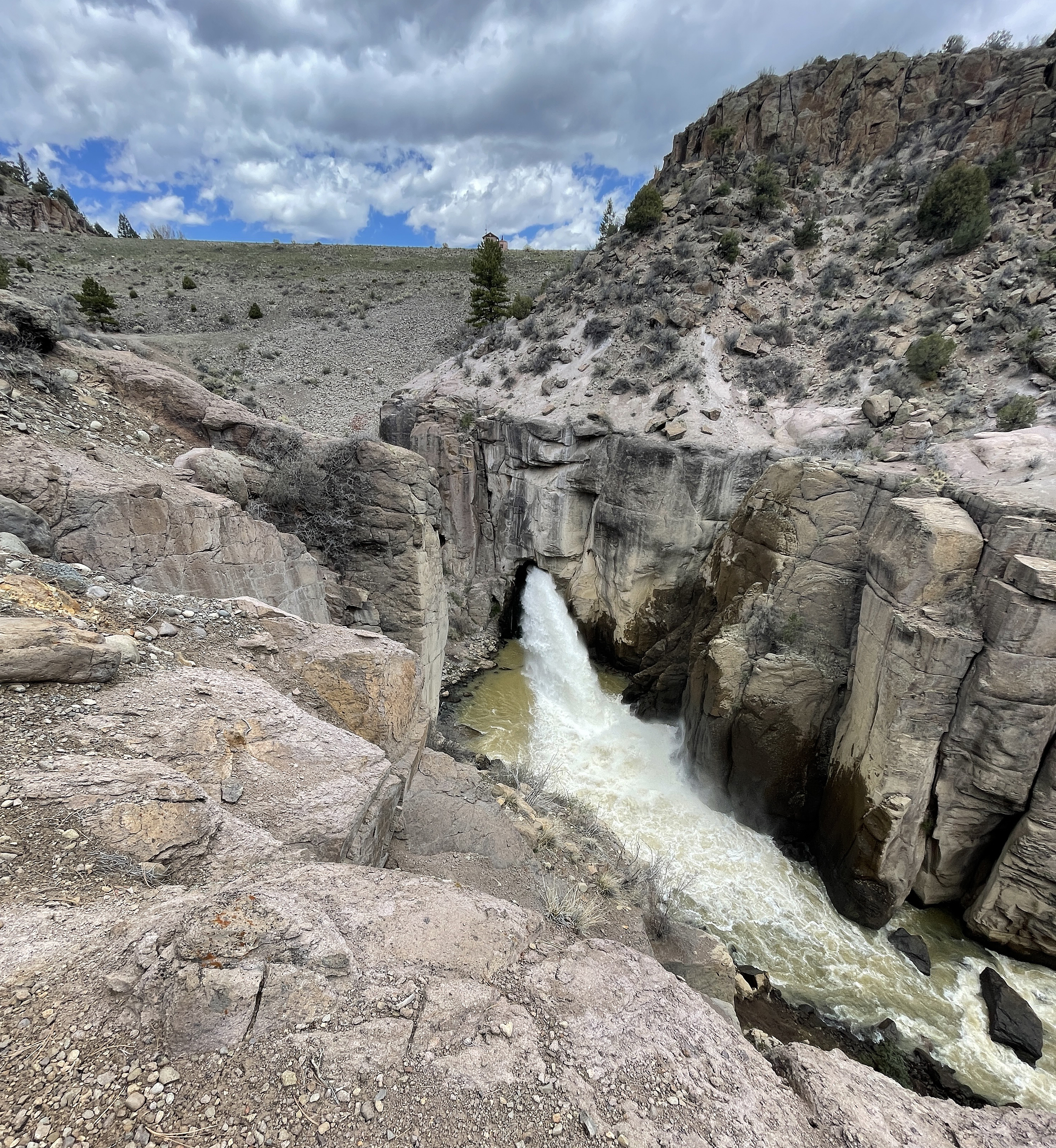
The reservoir's outlet from the dam's southern segment into the Alamosa River

Terrace Reservoir is located in Conejos County, Colorado northwest of the town of Capulin. It is surrounded by the Rio Grande National Forest. The reservoir is owned by the Terrace Irrigation Company, which uses the water it stores to irrigate agricultural crops in the nearby San Luis Valley.

== State wildlife area ==
The lake and the land immediately surrounding it are also designated as the Terrace Reservoir State Wildlife Area. The wildlife area offers hunting and fishing.

== Dam ==
The dam (National ID # CO00815) is an earthen dam built in 1912. It is split into two sections, with a mountain in the middle separating the two. The reservoir drains to the Alamosa River through a penstock on the southern segment of the dam. The spillway, which is on the northern dam segment, was replaced sometime after 2012.
