= Beaver Creek State Wildlife Area =

Wildlife area in Colorado, United States

- Location within Colorado
- Location: Fremont County, Colorado
- Nearest city: Penrose, Colorado
- Coordinates: 38°35′10″N 105°01′17″W

Beaver Creek State Wildlife Area is a tract of protected land located in central Colorado, near the town of Penrose. It covers 2,228 acres, encompassing habitats ranging from desert to conifer forests and meadows.

The wildlife area is named for Beaver Creek.
