= Summit Reservoir =

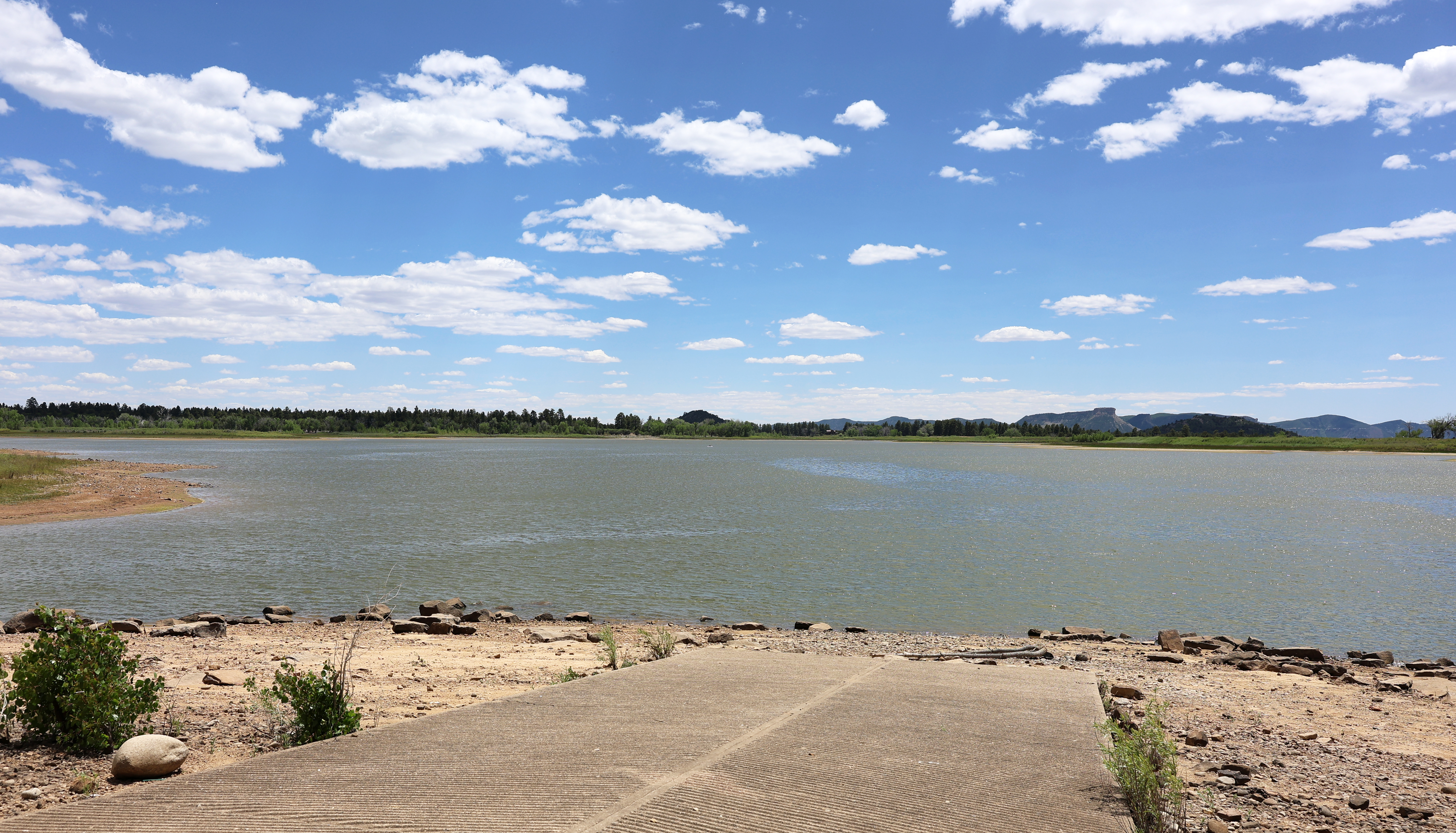
- The reservoir in 2025

- The reservoir's location in Colorado
- Location: Montezuma County, Colorado, U.S.
- Coordinates: 37°25′6.02″N 108°23′6.61″W
- Type: reservoir
- Primary inflows: Turkey Creek Ditch; Lost Canyon Ditch
- Primary outflows: various privately-owned ditches and pipelines
- Basin countries: United States
- Managing agency: Colorado Parks and Wildlife
- Designation: Summit Reservoir State Wildlife Area
- Built: 1905
- Surface area: 341 acres (138 hectares)
- Water volume: 3,840 acre-feet (4,740,000 cubic meters)
- Surface elevation: 7,372 feet (2,247 meters)

Summit Reservoir is in Montezuma County, Colorado, U.S., northwest of Mancos. The reservoir, which lies at an elevation of 7,372 feet (2,247 meters), stores irrigation water but is also a Colorado state wildlife area that offers fishing, wildfowl hunting, and wildlife viewing. The reservoir is reached by taking a short access road off of Colorado State Highway 184 nine miles (14 km) north and west of Mancos.

== History ==
The reservoir was built by the Summit Reservoir and Irrigation Company and began operation in 1907. The reservoir was enlarged in 1936 when the south dam was built and was further enlarged in 1960. Currently, 147 shareholders own the company's 400 shares. The agreement with the state of Colorado to provide public fishing access was made in the 1960s.

== Dams ==
The reservoir has two dams. The Summit Main Dam, NID ID CO01091, is a 42-foot (13-meter) high earthen dam that can store up to 7,050 acre-feet (8,700,000 cubic meters) of water. It was built in 1905 and is 7,270 feet (2,220 meters) wide. The Summit - South Dam, NID ID CO02882, is a 10-foot (3.0-meter) high earthen dam that can store up to 3,840 acre-feet (4,740,000 cubic meters) of water. It was built in 1937 and is 1,600 feet (490 meters) wide. Both dams and the reservoir are owned by the Summit Reservoir and Irrigation Company.

== State wildlife area ==
Part of the lake and some of the immediate area around it make up the Summit Reservoir State Wildlife Area. Fishing is the wildlife area's chief activity. The reservoir has 341 surface acres (138 ha) and has a boat ramp, but at times only hand-launched watercraft may be allowed. Anglers catch channel catfish, smallmouth bass, and crappie, among others.
