= Trinchera Creek =

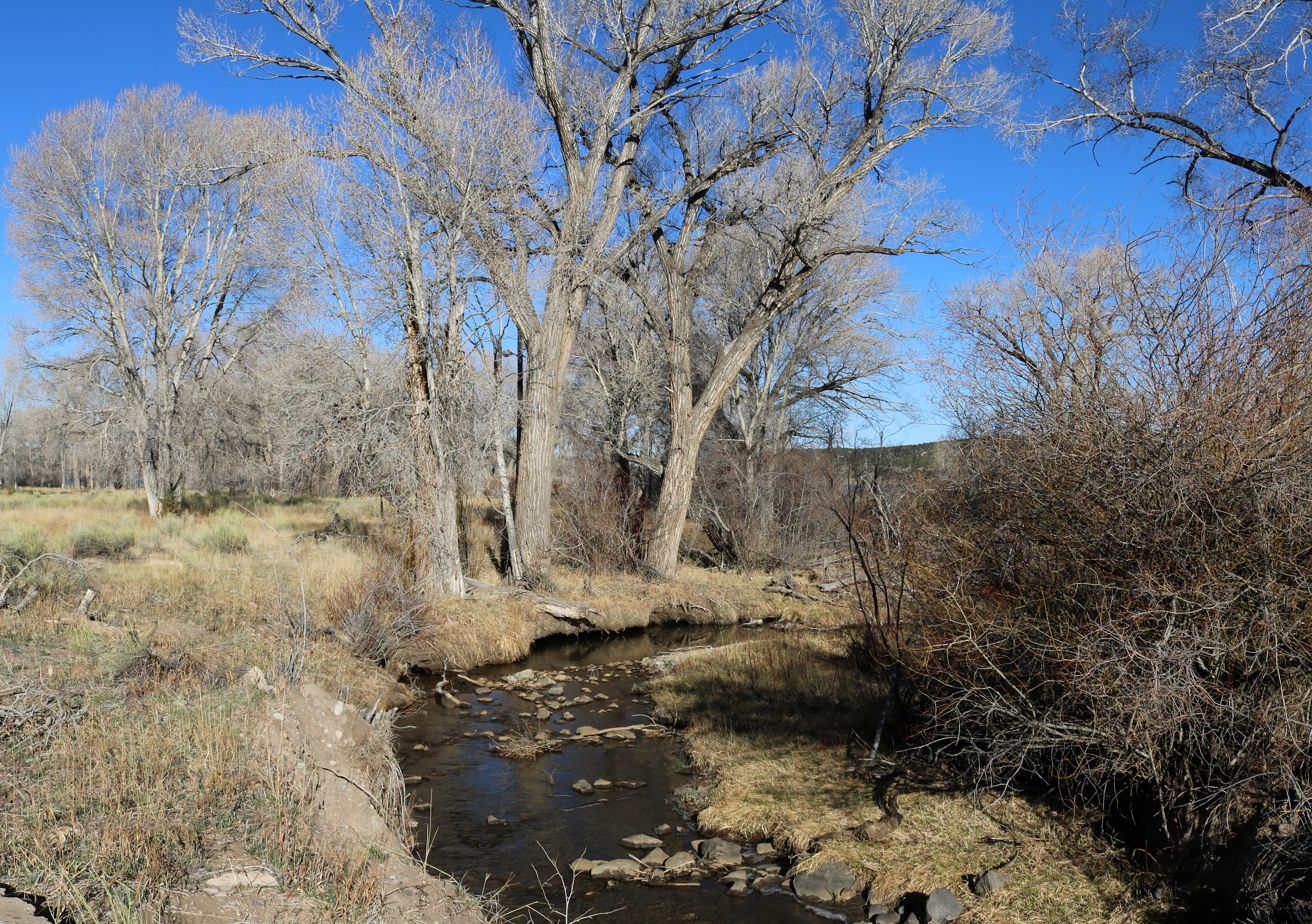
- The creek viewed from a bridge on County Lane 6, above Mountain Home Reservoir.

Physical characteristics
- Source
  - location: Costilla County, Colorado
  - coordinates: 37°31′02″N 105°10′20″W
- Mouth
  - location: Confluence with Rio Grande
  - coordinates: 37°18′51″N 105°44′17″W
  - elevation: 7,497 ft (2,285 m)

Basin features
- Progression: Rio Grande

Trinchera Creek is a tributary of the Rio Grande in Costilla County, Colorado in the United States. It flows west from a source in the Sangre de Cristo Mountains to a confluence with the Rio Grande.

It is spanned by the San Luis Southern Railway Trestle, which is listed on the National Register of Historic Places.

== Dams ==
The creek has two dams which create reservoirs that are popular fishing spots. The reservoirs include Mountain Home Reservoir near Fort Garland and Smith Reservoir three miles south of Blanca.

== See also ==
- List of rivers of Colorado
