= Williams Creek Reservoir =

Reservoir in Colorado, United States

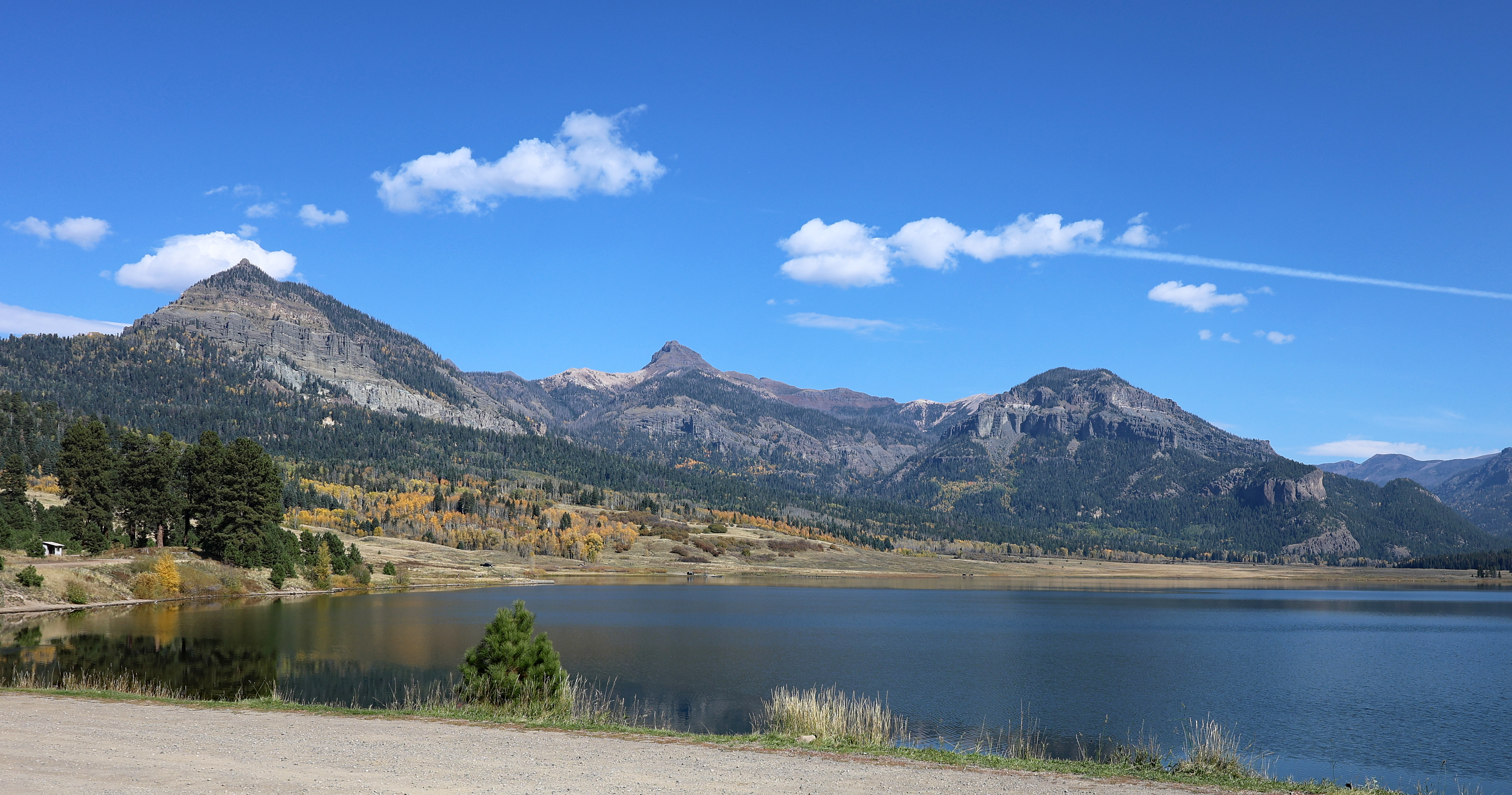

- The reservoir's location in Colorado
- Location: Colorado
- Coordinates: 37°30′45.23″N 107°13′15.10″W
- Primary inflows: Williams Creek
- Primary outflows: Williams Creek
- Basin countries: United States
- Managing agency: Colorado Parks and Wildlife; United States Forest Service
- Surface elevation: 8,248 feet (2,514 meters)
- Frozen: Freezes in winter

Williams Creek Reservoir lies in Hinsdale County, Colorado, U.S., north of Pagosa Springs. The reservoir and some of the land around it make up the Williams Creek Reservoir State Wildlife Area. The wildlife area lies within the San Juan National Forest and is surrounded by the San Juan Mountains.

== Dam ==
Built in 1958, the Williams Creek Dam is an earthen dam that impounds Williams Creek. The 100-foot (30-meter) high dam stores 14,543 acre-feet (17,939,000 cubic meters) of water. Colorado Parks and Wildlife owns the dam, and its NID ID# is CO01099.

== State wildlife area ==
The 508-acre (206-hectare) Williams Creek Reservoir State Wildlife Area centers on the reservoir. The wildlife area offers waterfowl hunting and fishing, including ice fishing.

== Camping and recreation ==
There are three campgrounds administered by the United States Forest Service close to the lake, with two others nearby. The reservoir is stocked with fish, so fishing is popular there, and a boat ramp is available. Standup paddleboarding is popular at the lake. There are also several hiking trails in the area.

The reservoir is a stop on the Colorado Birding Trail. The birds viewable at or near the reservoir include red-naped sapsuckers, fox sparrows, MacGillivray's warblers, Cassin's finches, Hammond's flycatchers, and three-toed woodpeckers.
