= Poudre River Public Library District =

- 40°35′5.84″N 105°4′21.32″W
- Location: Larimer County, Colorado
- Established: 2006
- Branches: 3

Collection
- Size: 1,218,203 (2019)

Access and use
- Circulation: 2,903,786 (2019)
- Members: 162,089 (2019)

Other information
- Budget: 10,272,982 (2019)
- Director: Diane Lapierre
- Website: www.poudrelibraries.org

The Poudre River Public Library District was established in 2006 by citizen vote, with the established Fort Collins Public Library as its foundation. It serves more than 177,000 people across northern Larimer County, Colorado including Fort Collins and Timnath.

The district is governed by an all-volunteer board of trustees appointed by city and county officials. The current board, composed of seven experienced community leaders, began its work immediately after being appointed in March, 2007. The board is responsible for guiding the transition from a city library system to a broader library district; for overseeing library operations; and for developing a long-range vision for the district.

== History ==
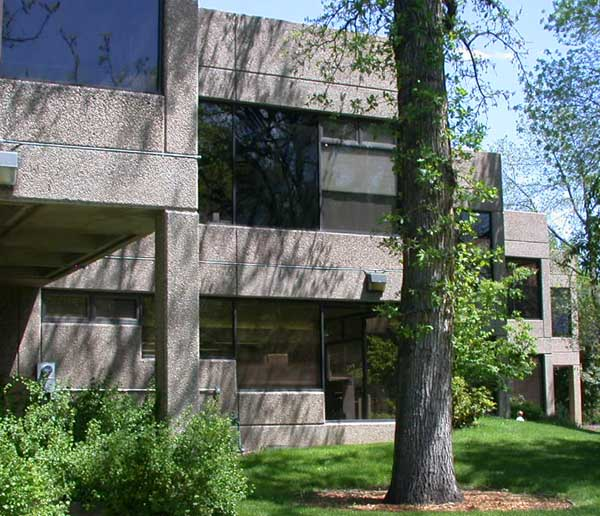
Exterior of Old Town Library in Fort Collins

The Poudre River Public Library District was formerly known as both the Fort Collins Public Library and the Fort Collins Regional Library District. The library as an institution dates from the late 19th century when a collection was housed on South College Avenue in downtown. In 1903, the library acquired its first dedicated structure by a donation from philanthropist Andrew Carnegie. It was the sixth public library in the state. The Carnegie Library building, located in Library Park (formerly Lincoln Park) was used to house the library collection until 1974, when the current Old Town Library (formerly Main Library) was constructed on the east side of Library Park. The former Carnegie Library now houses the Fort Collins Museum. In 1998 a second branch, Harmony Library, was constructed on Harmony Road in southwest Fort Collins. Harmony Library is a joint-use facility operated by Front Range Community College and the library district. In 2009 the district opened a third branch, Council Tree Library, in southeast Fort Collins at Front Range Village Shopping Center.

The district has an extensive collection on the history of Fort Collins and Larimer County. The library holds about 270,000 items; its special local history archive moved to the nearby Fort Collins Museum of Discovery on April 1, 2007.

Library use in Fort Collins climbed 30% between 2008 and 2013. In January, 2013, patrons of the district's libraries checked out 78,200 video and audio items. During 2013, 3.13 million items were checked out by the 140,912 cardholders, and foot traffic totaled 1.14 million across the three libraries. There were 15,328 new cardholders in 2013.

In 2014, The Poudre River Public Library District partnered with Colorado State University to allow faculty, staff, and students access to the District's libraries using CSU-issued ID cards. In 2020, the district stopped assessing fines on overdue materials.

Since 2016, the district has hosted the annual Fort Collins Book Fest with themes like Beer, Science, and Food.

== Library branches and administrative buildings ==
- Old Town Library
- Harmony Library
- Council Tree Library
- Webster House Administrative Center

== Awards and recognition ==
- Urban Libraries Council Top Innovators in 2013
- Library Journal 3 Star Library 2020
