= Mamie Birdwhistle =

American community leader

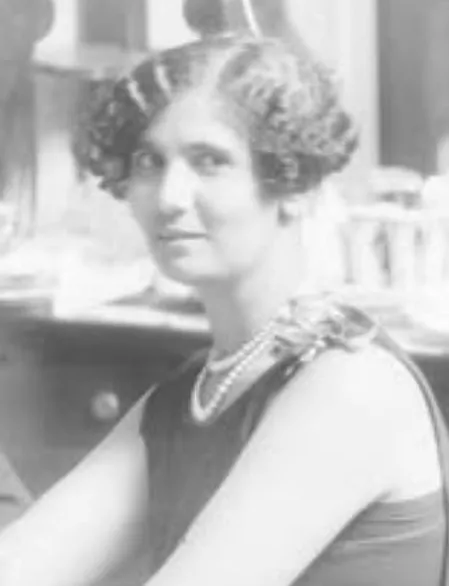
- Born: Mamie A. Lowe; January 4, 1880; Alabama
- Died: January 17, 1943 (aged 63); Fort Collins, CO
- Spouse: Charles Birdwhistle
- Children: Virgil Birdwhistle

Mamie Birdwhistle (January 4, 1880 – January 17, 1943) was an American community leader. Born in Alabama and mostly active in Fort Collins, Colorado, she and her husband, Charles Birdwhistle, played a pivotal role in supporting the local African American community. Their home at 1005 Oak Street became a central gathering place, serving as an informal hotel, church, and social venue for Black musicians, athletes, students, and gospel groups from 1920 to 1946.

== Biography ==
The Birdwhistles moved to Fort Collins, Colorado in the early 1920s, during the Great Migration. They were the first Black couple to live in the city.

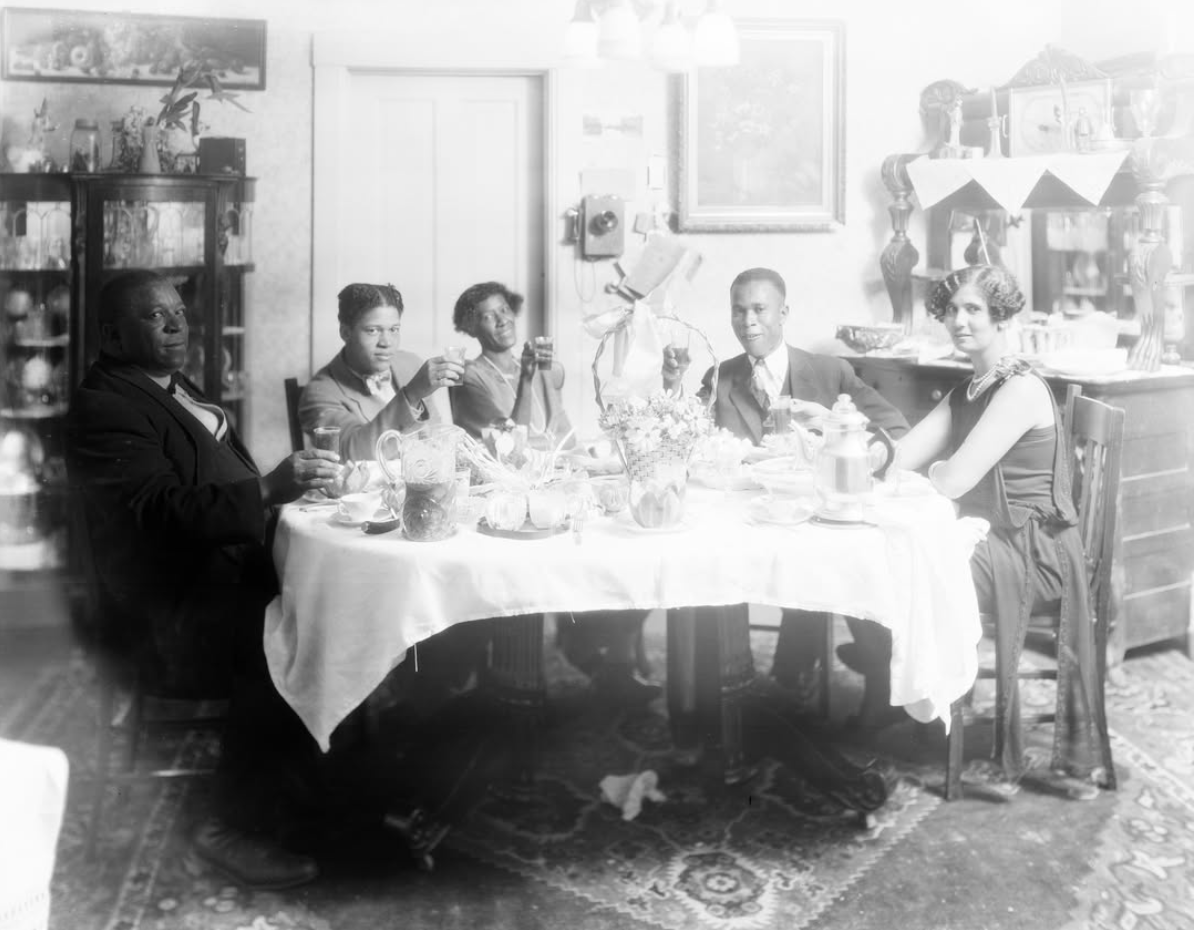
Charles Birdwhistle (far left) and Mamie Birdwhistle (far right) sitting down with guests.

The Birdwhistle household at 1005 Oak Street in Fort Collins, Colorado served as a gathering spot for Black musicians, students, athletes, and gospel groups from 1920 to 1946. As the only Black homeowners on the block, Mamie and Charles Birdwhistle frequently hosted individuals and groups, using their home as an informal hotel, church, and venue for social events.

The Birdwhistles hosted musical groups traveling for performances, provided lodging for young Black athletes visiting to compete against CSU, and organized social gatherings for the Black community, celebrating events like marriages or simply providing a space for fellowship.

Mamie worked as a cook for the Poudre School District. Charles started work as head waiter at the Northern Hotel and later became a self-employed janitor for various businesses in Fort Collins. Charles was ordained as a minister in 1925. He served as a traveling pastor for Northern Colorado and the African Methodist Episcopal Church. As a veteran of the Spanish–American War, Charles was appointed chaplain of Colorado veterans in 1931. Mamie and Charles had a son, Virgil Birdwhistle, who was born in Fort Collins.

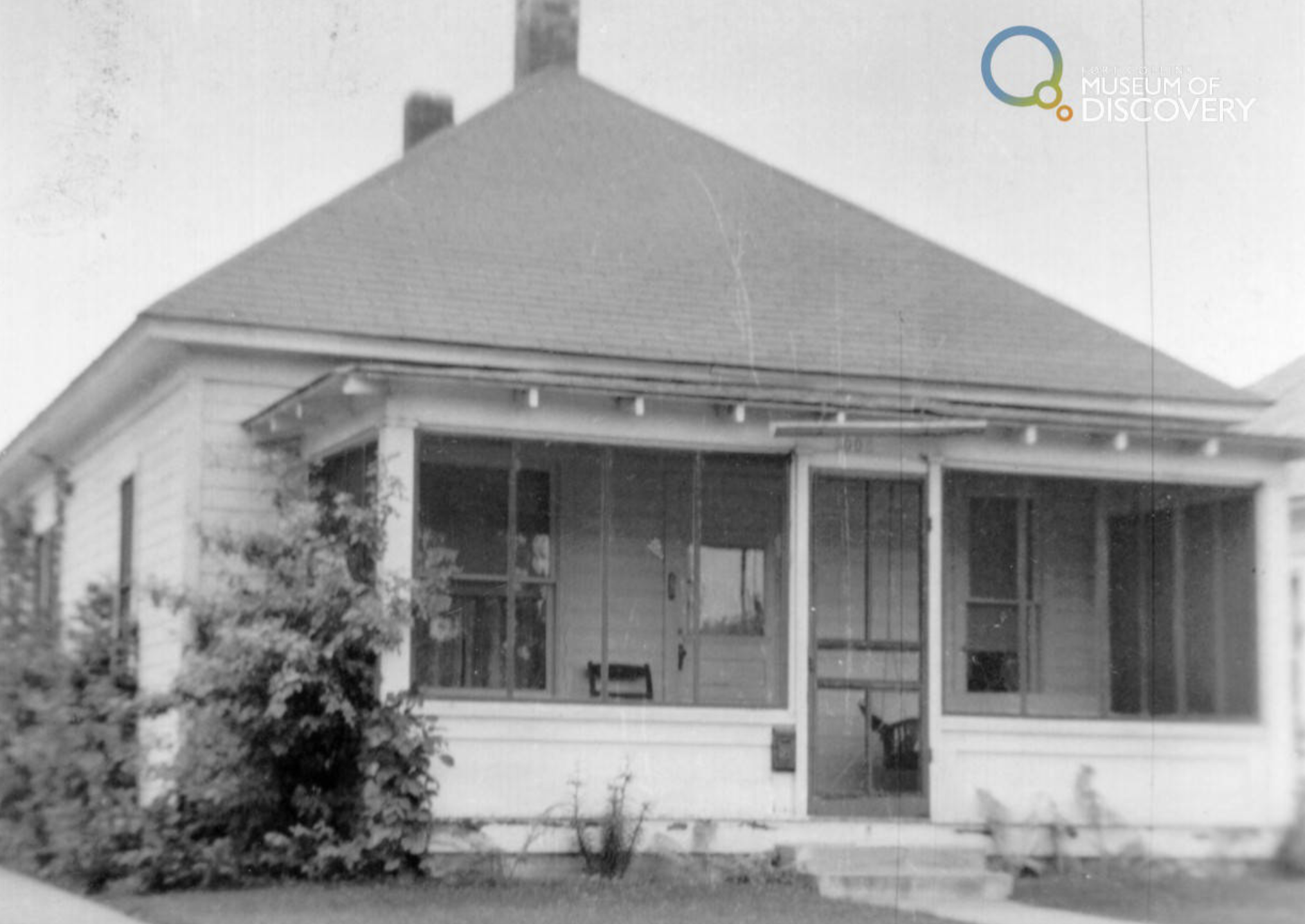
The Birdwhistles' home on 1005 W. Oak, in Fort Collins, Colorado.

Mamie Birdwhistle died in the county hospital of Fort Collins on January 17, 1943. She is buried in Grandview Cemetery.

== Legacy ==
Elevation Community Land Trust constructed the Birdwhistle Townhomes in Fort Collins as part of their initiative to provide affordable housing options for low to moderate-income households in Colorado. The project was inspired by the Birdwhistle family's commitment to providing safe housing and community support through their own home.
