= Mark D. Miller =

American photographer (1891–1970)

Mark David Miller (August 6, 1891 – May 8, 1970) was an American photographer.

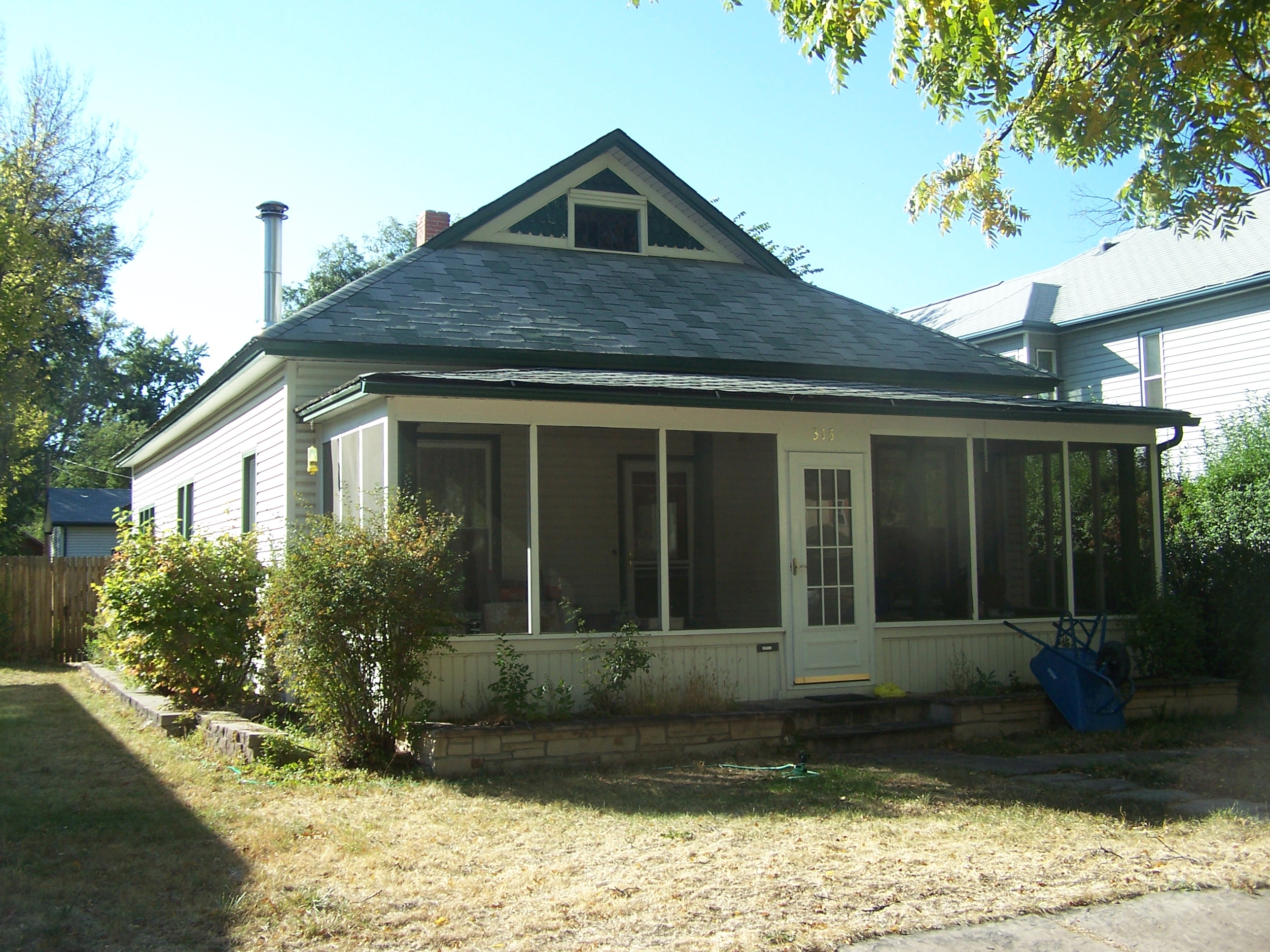
Mark Miller house on Whedbee Street in Fort Collins

Mark was born in Scranton, Kansas, the son of Amos B. Miller and Mary Martindale Miller. In 1905, his family moved to the Fort Collins, Colorado, area, possibly to alleviate his mother’s asthmatic condition.

In 1911, Miller apprenticed himself as a photographer to Claude Patrick. In 1912, he opened his own photographic business in Longmont, Colorado, 40 miles southwest of Fort Collins. In 1914, Miller bought Patrick’s studio in Fort Collins and subsequently moved there, first living upstairs from the studio and then moving to a nearby house.

Between 1910 and Miller’s death in 1970, it is estimated he took over 70,000 pictures of Fort Collins landmarks, portraits of local citizens, and local scenery such as the Poudre Canyon near Fort Collins. Miller’s photography is represented in the book Fort Collins: The Miller Photographs by Barbara Fleming and Malcolm McNeill.

Miller died on May 8, 1970, and is buried in Grandview Cemetery, Fort Collins in Fort Collins.

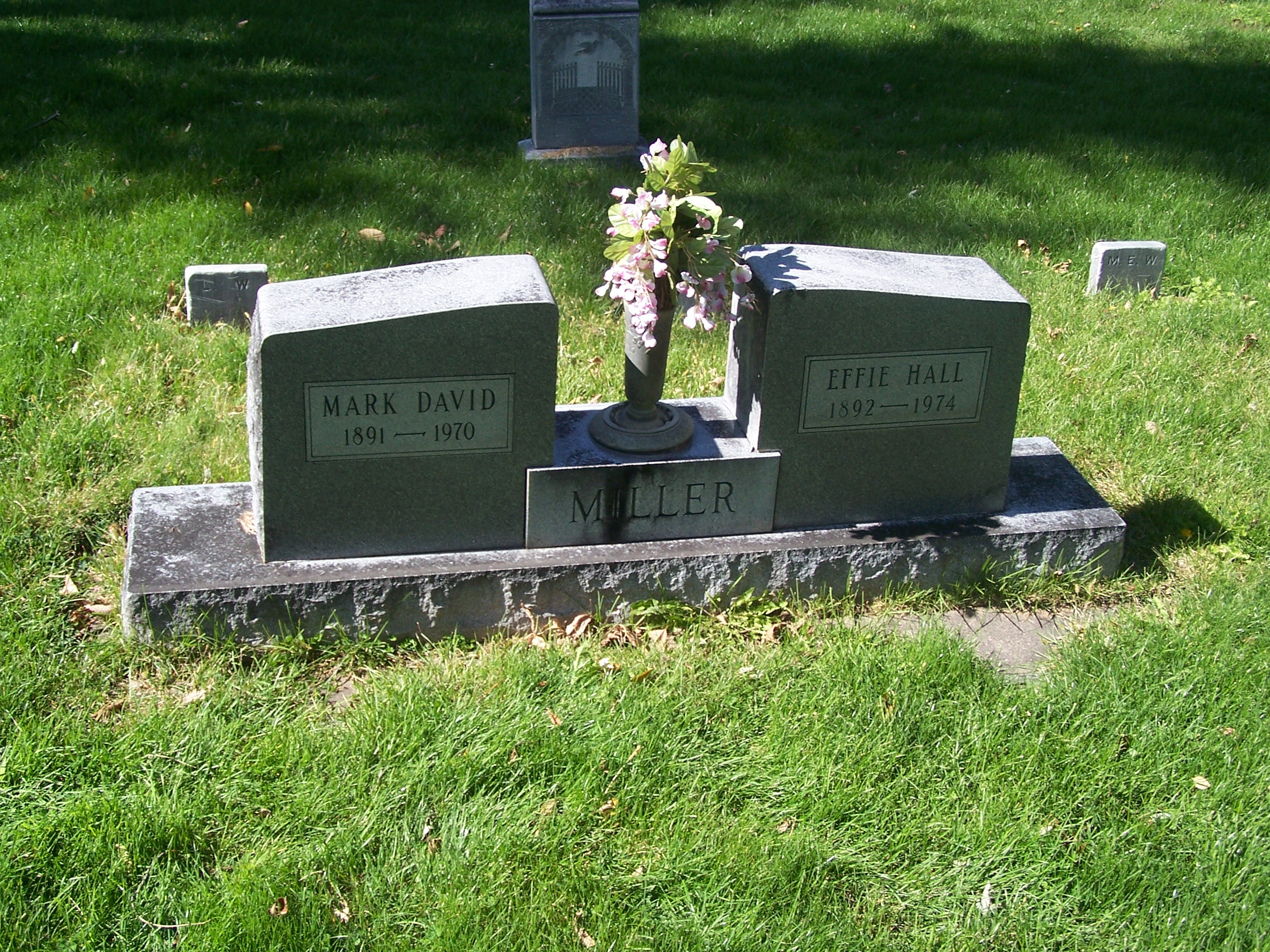
Mark Miller burial site in Grandview Cemetery

The bulk of Mark Miller's photographs were donated after his death to the Fort Collins Local History Archive, at the Fort Collins Museum.

== Sources ==
- Fleming, B. and McNeill, M., Fort Collins: The Miller Photographs. Charleston, SC: Arcadia Publishing, 2009. ISBN 978-0-7385-6987-1, ISBN 0-7385-6987-9.
