= Fred N. Cummings =

American politician

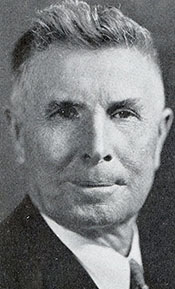

Member of the U.S. House of Representatives from Colorado's 2nd district
- In office March 4, 1933 – January 3, 1941
- Preceded by: Charles B. Timberlake
- Succeeded by: William S. Hill

Personal details
- Born: Fred Nelson Cummings; 18 September 1864 Groveton, New Hampshire, U.S.
- Died: 10 November 1952 (aged 88) Fort Collins, Colorado, U.S.
- Resting place: Grandview Cemetery, Fort Collins, Colorado
- Party: Democratic
- Other political affiliations: Populist; Socialist
- Spouse(s): Nancy Jane Sutton (m. 1889-1944, her death); Ina Graham (m. 1947-1951, her death)
- Children: 5
- Occupation: Farmer; Rancher

Fred Nelson Cummings (September 18, 1864 – November 10, 1952) was an American farmer and rancher who served as a Democratic U.S. Representative from Colorado, serving four terms from 1933 to 1941.

== Early life and education ==
Frederick Nelson Cummings was born on a farm near Groveton, New Hampshire on September 18, 1864, a son of George and Angeline Cummings. His father was a native of Canada and his mother had been born in Vermont. His family moved to Clinton, Iowa in 1865. In 1879, they relocated again, this time to a farm near West Union, Nebraska. Cummings attended the local schools in Clinton and West Union and became a farmer and rancher.

== Career ==
After deciding on a legal career, Cummings studied law with an attorney in Nebraska, attained Admission to the bar in 1891, and began to practice in Custer County, Nebraska. In 1899, Cummings was an unsuccessful Populist Party candidate for Custer County Judge. During the campaign he was accused of falsely claiming to have studied law and been admitted to the bar. After the Populist party became defunct, Cummings maintained an interest in political activity as a member of the Socialist Party of America.

In 1906, Cummings moved to Fort Collins, Colorado, where he continued farming and ranching, but discontinued the practice of law. From 1909 to 1913 he was a member of the Fort Collins city council. Before his election to Congress, Cummings served as president of the Mountain States Beet Growers Association, a lobbying and issues advocacy organization. He later served as president of the National Beet Growers Association.

=== Congress ===
In 1922, he was an unsuccessful Democratic candidate for Larimer County Commissioner. In 1932, Cummings was a successful Democratic candidate for election to the 73rd Congress. He was reelected three times and served from March 4, 1933, to January 3, 1941. Cummings was an unsuccessful candidate for reelection in 1940.

=== Later career ===
After leaving Congress, Cummings resumed farming and ranching. He died in Fort Collins on November 10, 1952. Cummings was buried at Grandview Cemetery in Fort Collins.

== Family ==
In 1889, Cummings married Nancy Jane Sutton (d. 1944). They were the parents of five children—George, Ralph, Harry, Edna, and Hugh. Cummings's sons Harry and Hugh predeceased him. In 1947, Cummings married Ina Graham, who died in 1951.

U.S. House of Representatives
Preceded by Charles B. Timberlake	Member of the U.S. House of Representatives from Colorado's 2nd congressional district 1933 – 1941	Succeeded by William S. Hill
