= Georgianna Coff =

Formerly enslaved domestic worker

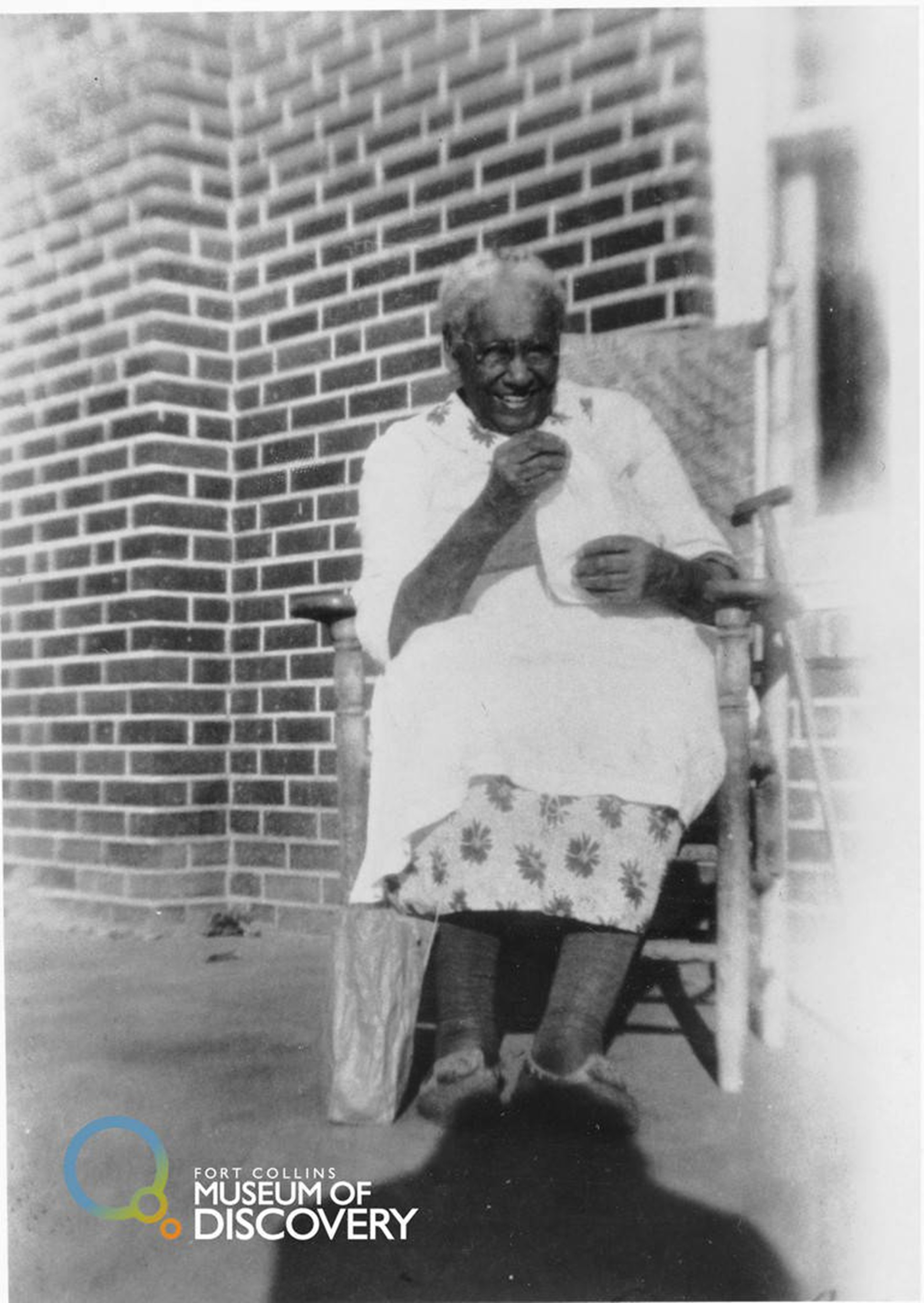

Georgianna Coff (May 20, 1853 – March 7, 1941), known as "Mammy" Coff, was a formerly enslaved domestic worker in Larimer County, Colorado. At the time of her death, she was said to be Fort Collins' only formerly enslaved resident. She bequeathed her $10,000 estate (worth around $220,000 in 2025) to survivors of the family which once owned her. The bequest was subject to a dispute after her death.

== Biography ==
=== Early life ===
Georgianna Coff (c. May 20, 1853 – March 7, 1941) was a formerly enslaved person born into slavery in Mississippi. It is unknown who her parents were. Sometime between 1864 and 1865 she was given to John Aleck Lunn's grandmother, Mrs. Thomas Lunn, who lived in Grand Rapids, Michigan. She came from the Mississippi plantation of Lunn's great-uncle, George Hay. George Hay was the only person on either side of the family that lived in Mississippi. After the 13th Amendment passed, Coff continued to live with the Lunn family and considered herself as a part of the Lunn family. In 1881, Georgianna Coff moved with the Lunns to Colorado.

=== Domestic service ===
After the passing of the 13th Amendment, Coff remained with the Lunn family and worked within the domestic service sector. She lived in multiple states where she looked after many children, being known as "Mammy". Coff was a skilled hand worker and spent many hours crocheting pieces for her friends.

Based on a 1900s Michigan census, Coff moved back to Grand Rapids and worked domestic labor. Leaving for Los Angeles, California in 1913, and then Pasadena, Coff worked as a domestic servant for the Tuft household in 1920. According to her obituary, she also worked as a maid for Mary A. Welch, the widow of Andrew Lunn. When the Lunn family needed help, she would return to the family to help.

=== Larimer County and death ===
It is documented that Coff started receiving care on May 27, 1924, at the Larimer County Hospital Old Folks home. She lived and worked there for 17 years, until her death.

Georgianna Coff died on March 7, 1941, at the Larimer County Old Folks home. She was 87 years old and was laid to rest in Grandview Cemetery in Fort Collins. Although her grave is unmarked, Coff is buried alongside the Lunn family.

=== Subsequent events ===
After Coff's death it was discovered that she had carefully saved money over the course of her life. She left her $10,355 estate to Alex Lunn who she had cared for when he was a child. Despite the final wishes in her will, the Larimer Country board of country commissioners asked for reimbursement for the cost of maintaining her at the country old people’s home since 1924. Larimer Country brought a lawsuit against her estate and won $8000 to cover the costs of her care in the final 17 years of her life. The remainder went to Alex Lunn in 1946.

Assistant professor of history Dr Alexander Pittman from Colorado State University, who teaches African American history and social studies, featured Coff (and others) in a video about early Fort Collins residents for Juneteenth. "Learning more about the early Fort Collins residents… offers a valuable perspective not only of our city’s history but also the broader events and trends in American history," Pittman said. "The lives they lived here in the late 1800s and early 1900s century were fascinating and help us better understand our local history and the story of our country."
