= Henderson C. Howard =

Union Army Medal of Honor recipient (1839–1919)

- Born: September 16, 1839; Indiana, Pennsylvania, US
- Died: December 13, 1919 (aged 80); Fort Collins, Colorado, US
- Burial place: Grandview Cemetery, Fort Collins, Colorado
- Military career
- Allegiance: United States; Union
- Branch: United States Army; Union Army
- Service years: 1861 - 1864
- Rank: First Sergeant
- Units: Company B, 11th Pennsylvania Reserves
- Conflicts: American Civil War; *Battle of Glendale
- Awards: Medal of Honor

Henderson Calvin Howard (September 16, 1839—December 13, 1919) was a Union Army soldier who received the Medal of Honor for his actions during the Peninsular Campaign of 1862.

== Biography ==
Howard was born in Indiana, Pennsylvania, on September 16, 1839, the son of Thomas Howard and Margaret Clark McLain Howard.

Henderson joined the army in June 1861. During the Battle of Glendale in Henrico County, Virginia, on June 30, 1862, he was involved in action against Confederate troops. He was captured at the Second Battle of Bull Run, but was later released.

Howard's Medal of Honor was not issued until March 30, 1898. He was one of only two men from the 11th Pennsylvania Reserves to receive the Medal of Honor; the other was Charles Shambaugh from Company D.

He was mustered out of the army in June 1864 with the rank of First Sergeant (he had been a Corporal during the battles of the Peninsular Campaign). After the war he served as the sheriff of Indiana County, Pennsylvania, from 1869 to 1872.

Howard married Katherine Dalby on March 4, 1879, in Indiana, Pennsylvania. They had a son, Ross Dalby Howard, who was born in 1882.

He died on December 13, 1919, in Fort Collins, Colorado.

== Medal of Honor citation ==
Citation:

While pursuing one of the enemy's sharpshooters, encountered two others, whom he bayoneted in hand-to-hand encounters; was three times wounded in action.

== See also ==
- List of Medal of Honor recipients
- List of American Civil War Medal of Honor recipients: G–L

== Notes ==
11th Pennsylvania Reserves Muster Roll
