= The Gardens on Spring Creek =

Botanical garden in Fort Collins, Colorado

Gardens on Spring Creek
- Location within Colorado
- Established: 2004
- Location: 2145 Centre Avenue; Fort Collins, Colorado 80526
- Coordinates: 40.561596°N 105.084631°W
- Type: Botanical garden
- Visitors: 70,000
- Parking: On site
- Website: www.fcgov.com/gardens

The Gardens on Spring Creek is an 18-acre (72,843 m^{2}) botanical garden located on the Spring Creek corridor in Fort Collins, Colorado. Located at 2145 Centre Avenue, the Gardens is owned and managed by the City of Fort Collins. A 501(c)(3) non-profit, volunteer board works in conjunction with the City of Fort Collins on behalf of the institution.

== History ==
The idea for a community-oriented horticulture center with an environmental focus was conceived by Jim Clark in 1986, after a visit to the Cheyenne Botanic Gardens, 40 miles to the north. Clark established a non-profit organization to support the establishment of the evolving vision, and over the next 9 years contributed several thousand hours leading the effort. As an intermediary step to creating a botanic garden, the non-profit group lobbied City Council to create a community horticulture program that was responsible for garden projects around the community. In 1995, City Council voted to fund a position responsible for creating the horticulture program, with Clark hired. Due to the success of that program and the continued efforts of Clark and the non-profit organization, funding for the creation of a community horticulture center was placed on the ballot as part of Building Community Choices (BCC). In 1997, Fort Collins voters enthusiastically supported BCC with 71% voting in favor of the proposal. $2 million was appropriated to create the first phase of what is now The Gardens on Spring Creek. Groundbreaking for the visitor center took place in 2004, with the site opening later that year. 2017 saw the groundbreaking for a 5-acre, multi-million dollar expansion of garden spaces for the site. Lasting for two years, this expansion saw the addition of 5 new garden spaces: Theme (Plant Select, Fragrance, Rose, Moon, Hummingbird and Butterfly), Great Lawn/Everitt Pavilion, Undaunted, Foothills, and Prairie Gardens. Completed in 2019, the project doubled the visitor center's square footage and added an all-glass butterfly house operated in partnership with the Butterfly Pavilion of Westminster, CO.

== Features ==
=== Current garden spaces ===
- Entryway Garden
- Children's Garden (2006)
- Xeric Parkway Strip (2006)
- Garden of Eatin' (2009)
- Rock Garden (2010)
- Wetlands Garden (2011)
- Sustainable Backyard (2013)
- The Great Lawn and Everitt Pavilion (2018)
- The Undaunted Garden (2018)
- Prairie Garden (2018)
- Foothills Garden (2018)
- Theme Gardens (2018): Plant Select® Garden, Fragrance Garden, Rose Garden, Moon Garden, and Hummingbird & Butterfly Garden
- Butterfly House (2019)
- Welcome Garden (2020)

== See also ==
- List of botanical gardens in the United States
