= 11th Pennsylvania Reserve Regiment =

Union Army infantry regiment

11th Pennsylvania Reserve Regiment (40th Pennsylvania Volunteer Infantry)
- Active: May 9, 1861 to June 13, 1864
- Country: United States
- Allegiance: Union
- Branch: Infantry
- Engagements: Seven Days Battles; Battle of Mechanicsville; Battle of Gaines's Mill; Battle of Savage's Station; Battle of Glendale; Battle of Malvern Hill; Second Battle of Bull Run; Battle of South Mountain; Battle of Antietam; Battle of Fredericksburg; Battle of Gettysburg; Bristoe Campaign; Mine Run Campaign; Battle of the Wilderness; Battle of Spotsylvania Court House; Battle of Totopotomoy Creek

The 11th Pennsylvania Reserve Regiment also known as the 40th Pennsylvania Volunteer Infantry was an infantry regiment that served in the Pennsylvania Reserves infantry division of the Union Army during the American Civil War.

== Organization ==
Company	Moniker	Primary Location of Recruitment	Captains
A	The Cambria Guards	Cambria County	Robert Litzinger
B	The Indiana National Guards	Indiana County	Daniel S. Porter
C	The Dixon Guards	Butler County	Samuel Loudon
D	The Canongessing Rangers	Butler County	William Stewart
E	The Washington Blues	Indiana County	Nathaniel Nesbit
F	The Union Volunteers	Fayette County	Edward Bierer
G	The Independent Blues	Armstrong County	James P. Speer
H	The Westmoreland Blues	Westmoreland County	Daniel Kistler
I	The Washington Blues	Westmoreland County	Thomas H. Spires
K	The Brady Guards	Jefferson County	Evans R. Brady

== Service ==
The 11th Pennsylvania Reserves was organized at Camp Wright near Pittsburgh, Pennsylvania beginning May 9, 1861 and mustered in June 29 through July 5, 1861 under the command of Colonel Thomas F. Gallagher. The regiment was armed with Model 1842 smoothbore muskets and used them for its entire service.

The regiment was attached to 2nd Brigade, McCall's Pennsylvania Reserves Division, Army of the Potomac, to March 1862. 2nd Brigade, 2nd Division, I Corps, Army of the Potomac, to April 1862. 2nd Brigade, McCall's Division, Department of the Rappahannock, to June 1862. 2nd Brigade, 3rd Division, V Corps, to August 1862. 3rd Brigade, 3rd Division, III Corps, Army of Virginia, to September 1862. 3rd Brigade, 3rd Division, I Corps, Army of the Potomac, to February 1863. 3rd Brigade, Pennsylvania Reserves Division, XXII Corps, Department of Washington, to June 1863. 3rd Brigade, 3rd Division, V Corps, Army of the Potomac, to November 1863. 1st Brigade, 3rd Division, V Corps, to June 1864.

The 11th Pennsylvania Reserves mustered out June 13, 1864.

== Detailed service ==
Moved to Harrisburg, Pa., June 24, then to Baltimore, Md., June 25, and to Washington, D.C., June 26. Duty at Tennallytown, Md., and picket at Great Falls August 2 to October 10, 1861. At Camp Pierpont, near Langley, Va., until March 1862. Expedition to Grinnell's Farm December 6, 1861. Advance on Manassas, Va., March 10–15, 1862. McDowell's advance on Falmouth April 9–19. Duty at Manassas Junction, Catlett's Station, and Falmouth, until June. Moved to White House June 9–12. Seven Days before Richmond June 25-July 1. Battles of Mechanicsville June 26, Gaines's Mill June 27 (most of the regiment captured and exchanged August 5, 1862), Charles City Cross Roads, Glendale, June 30, Malvern Hill July 1. At Harrison's Landing until August 16. Movement to join Pope August 16–26. Battle of Groveton August 29. Second Battle of Bull Run August 30. Maryland Campaign September 6–24. Battle of South Mountain, Md., September 14. Battle of Antietam September 16–17. Duty in Maryland until October 30. Movement to Falmouth, Va., October 30-November 19. Battle of Fredericksburg, Va., December 12–15. "Mud March" January 20–24, 1863. Moved to Washington, D. C., February 6. Duty there and at Alexandria until June 25. Ordered to rejoin the Army of the Potomac in the field. Battle of Gettysburg, July 1–3. Pursuit of Lee July 5–24. Duty on the Rapidan until October. Bristoe Campaign October 9–22. Advance to line of the Rappahannock November 7–8. Rappahannock Station November 7. Mine Run Campaign November 26-December 2. Duty at Alexandria until April 1864. Rapidan Campaign May 4–30. Battle of the Wilderness May 5–7, Laurel Hill May 8, Spotsylvania May 8–12, and Spotsylvania Court House May 12–21. Assault on the Salient May 12. Harris Farm May 19. North Anna River May 23–26. Jericho Ford May 25. On line of the Pamunkey May 26–28. Totopotomoy May 28–30. Left the front May 30.

== Casualties ==
The regiment lost a total of 309 men during service; 11 officers and 185 enlisted men killed or mortally wounded, 1 officer and 112 enlisted men died of disease.

== Commanders ==
- Colonel Thomas F. Gallagher - discharged December 12, 1862 due to wounds received in action at the Battle of South Mountain
- Colonel Samuel McCartney Jackson

== Notable members ==
- 1st Sergeant Henderson C. Howard, Company B - Medal of Honor recipient for action at the Battle of Glendale
- 1st Lieutenant George Washington Fleeger, Company C - U.S. Representative from Pennsylvania, 1885-1887
- Captain Edward Scofield, Company K - 19th governor of Wisconsin, 1897-1901
- Corporal Charles Shambaugh, Company D - Medal of Honor recipient for action at the Battle of Glendale

== See also ==
- List of Pennsylvania Civil War Units
- Pennsylvania in the Civil War
