= Colorado Marathon =

Marathon race in Fort Collins, Colorado

- Date: May
- Location: Fort Collins, Colorado, United States
- Event type: Road
- Distance: Marathon
- Established: 2002
- Website: www.thecoloradomarathon.com

The Colorado Marathon (formerly known as the Fort Collins Old Town Marathon) is an annual marathon held in Fort Collins, Colorado. The majority of the course goes down the Poudre River Canyon in northern Colorado; the marathon advertises itself as "America's Most Scenic Course". Other events include a half-marathon, a 10K, a 5K, and a kids' run.

The course is slightly downhill for the majority of the race. In the race's first four years, 18% of the finishers qualified for the Boston Marathon.

The race typically takes place on the first weekend in May.

== Records ==
=== Men ===
- 2004: Daniel Shaw, 2:25:55.8

=== Women ===
- 2006: Kara Roy, 2:46:30
