= Charles B. Timberlake =

American politician (1854–1941)

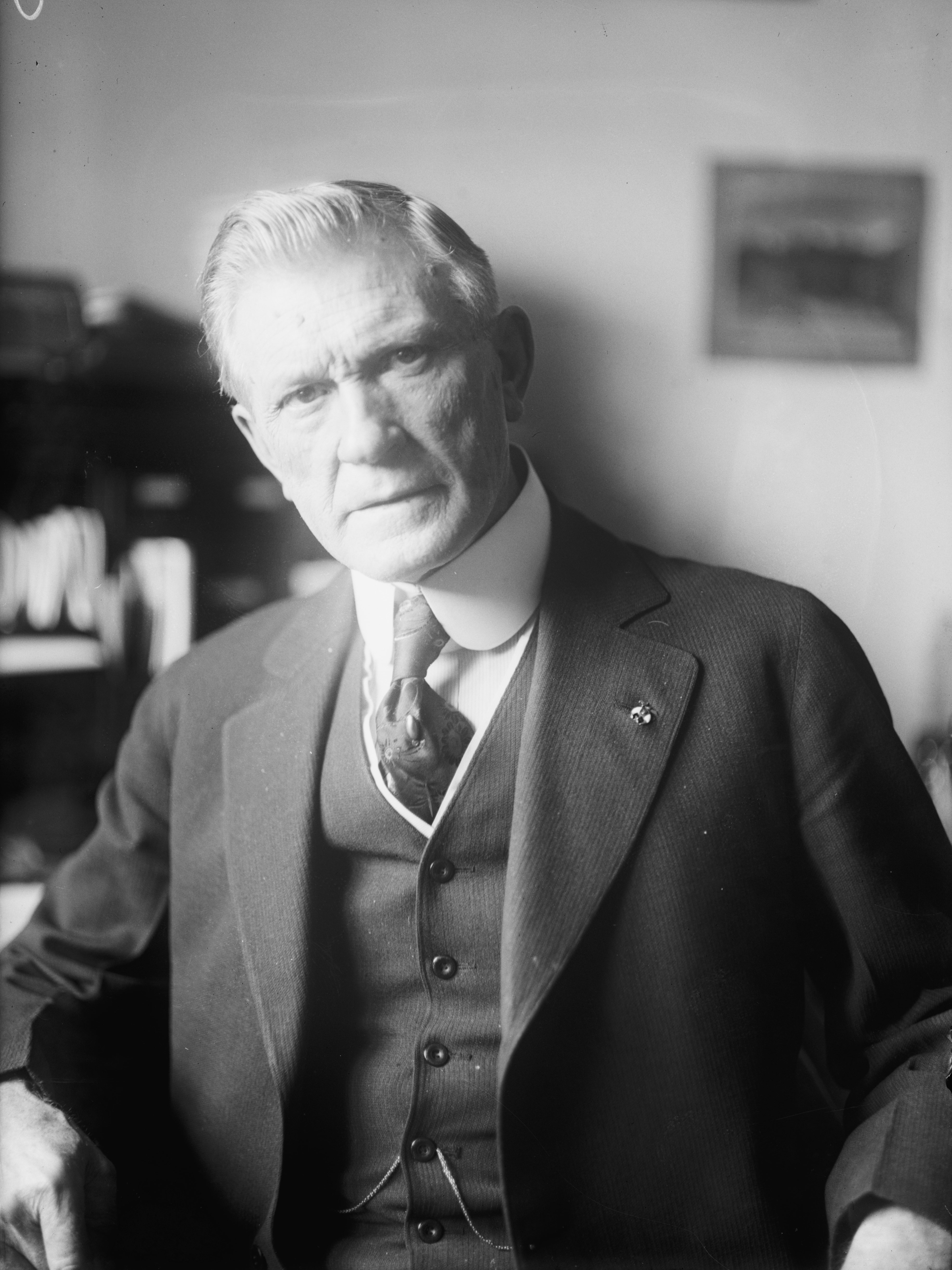

Member of the U.S. House of Representatives from Colorado's 2nd district
- In office March 4, 1915 – March 3, 1933
- Preceded by: Harry H. Seldomridge
- Succeeded by: Fred N. Cummings

Personal details
- Born: Charles Bateman Timberlake; September 25, 1854 Wilmington, Ohio, U.S.
- Died: May 31, 1941 (aged 86) Sterling, Colorado, U.S.

Charles Bateman Timberlake (September 25, 1854 – May 31, 1941) was an American farmer and educator who served as a U.S. representative from Colorado from 1915 to 1933.

== Biography ==
Born in Wilmington, Ohio, Timberlake attended the common schools and Earlham College, Richmond, Indiana from 1871 to 1874. He taught school. He moved to Colorado in 1885, and settled near Holyoke, Phillips County.

=== Early career ===
He engaged in agricultural pursuits and stock raising. He served as member of the Republican State committee 1892–1910. He served as superintendent of schools of Phillips County from 1889 to 1895 and as county clerk from 1895 to 1897. He was appointed receiver of the United States land office at Sterling, Colorado, on July 1, 1897, and served until April 30, 1914.

=== Congress ===
Timberlake was elected as a Republican to the Sixty-fourth and to the eight succeeding Congresses (March 4, 1915 – March 3, 1933). He was an unsuccessful candidate for renomination in 1932.

=== Later career and death ===
He engaged in banking in Sterling, Colorado, until his death there on May 31, 1941. He was interred in Grandview Cemetery, Fort Collins.

U.S. House of Representatives
Preceded by Harry H. Seldomridge	Member of the U.S. House of Representatives from Colorado's 2nd congressional district March 4, 1915 – March 3, 1933	Succeeded by Fred N. Cummings
