= Charles Shambaugh =

United States Army Medal of Honor recipient (1839–1913)

- Born: August 25, 1839; Prussia
- Died: October 13, 1913 (aged 74); Washington, D.C.
- Burial place: Prospect hill cemetery, Washington, D.C.
- Military career
- Allegiance: United States of America; Union
- Branch: United States Army; Union Army
- Service years: 1861 - 1862
- Rank: Corporal
- Units: Company D, 11th Pennsylvania Reserves
- Conflicts: American Civil War: Battle of Charles City Crossroads
- Awards: Medal of Honor

Charles Shambaugh (August 25, 1839 – October 13, 1913) was born in Prussia and was a Union Army soldier during the American Civil War who received America's highest military decoration the Medal of Honor for his actions at the Battle of Charles City Crossroads.

== Biography ==
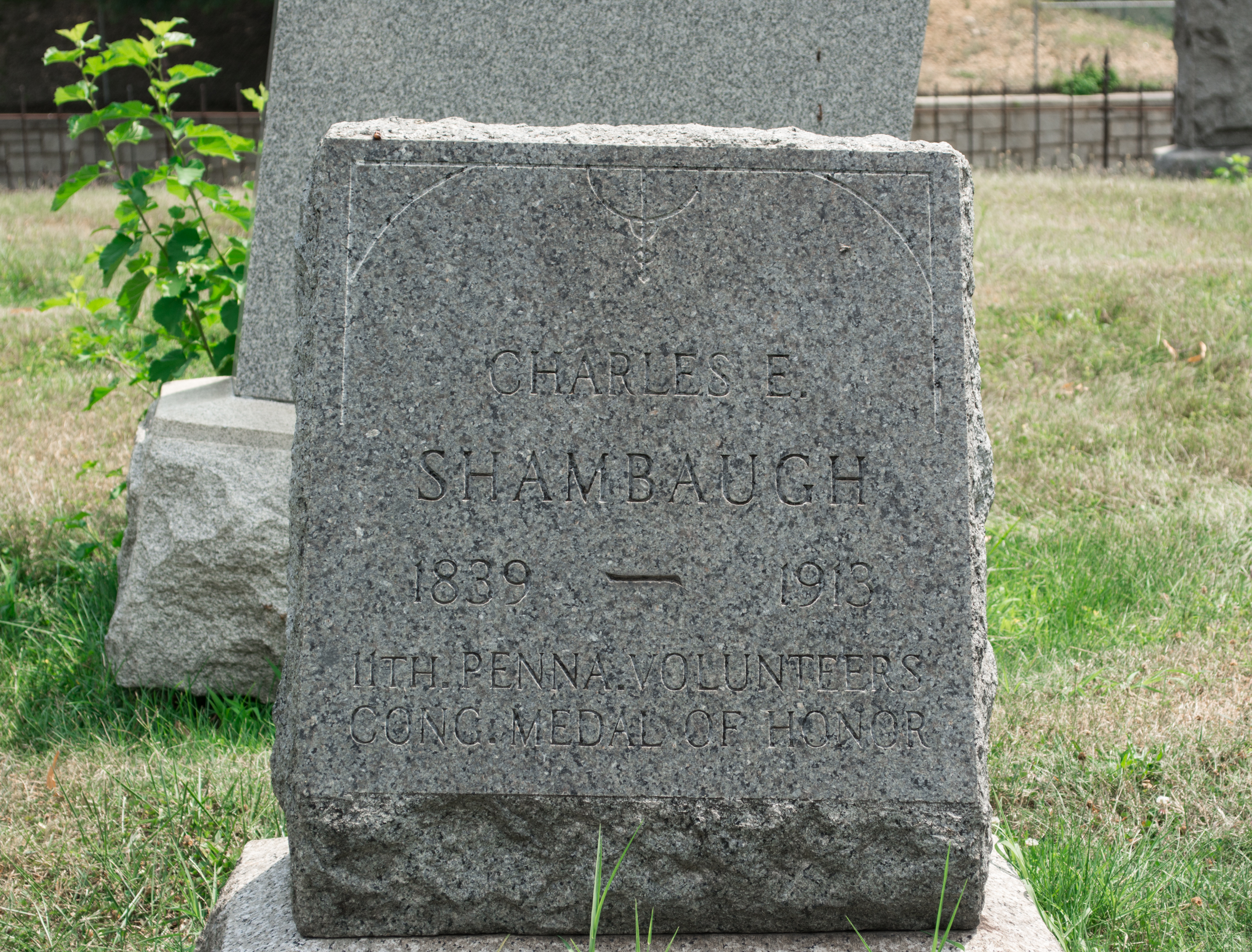
Grave of Charles Shambaugh at Prospect Hill Cemetery in Washington, D.C.

Shambaugh joined the army in Indiana County, Pennsylvania and served in Company D of the 11th Pennsylvania Reserves. His Medal of Honor was officially awarded on July 17, 1866, and he is one of only two recipients of the medal from the 11th Pennsylvania Reserves, the other being Henderson C. Howard.

He is buried in Prospect Hill Cemetery (Washington, D.C.).

His biography as listed in the Prospect Hill Cemetery database is as follows:

Born in Prussia on August 25, 1839, Charles Shambaugh immigrated to the United States in 1847, when he was about 8 years old. Nothing is known about his life here until the time of the Civil War.

On June 10, 1861, he enlisted in the Pennsylvania Reserves, where he served as a corporal in the infantry. He was wounded on August 30, 1862, during the Second Battle of Bull Run. Six weeks later, on October 13, 1862, he left the service on a disability discharge.

Four years later, on July 17, 1866, he was awarded a Medal of Honor for his meritorious actions at Charles City Crossroads, Virginia, June 30, 1862. The citation was "capture of flag."

It appears that Shambaugh returned to Pennsylvania after his discharge, for it is known that a daughter, Jennie, was born to him there in 1873. Another daughter, Lizzie, was born in Kansas in 1877. (We know nothing about his wife, who apparently was deceased by the time the 1900 census was taken.)

By 1890 he had come to the District of Columbia and was living at 6121 Street, NE. According to the City Directories for 1890 and 1891, in 1890 he was employed as a watchman; in 1891 he worked as an elevator operator. By 1900 he had moved to 1108 K Street, NE.

He died October 12, 1913, in Hyattsville, Maryland, at age 73. He was buried at Prospect Hill Cemetery in Washington, D.C.

== Medal of Honor citation ==

Rank and Organization:

Corporal, Company D, 11th Pennsylvania Reserves. Place and Date: At Charles City Crossroads, Va., June 30, 1862. Entered Service At: Indiana County, Pa. Birth: Prussia. Date of Issue: July 17, 1866.

Citation:

Capture of flag.

== See also ==
- List of Medal of Honor recipients
- List of American Civil War Medal of Honor recipients: Q–S

== Notes ==
11th Pennsylvania Reserves Muster Roll
