= West Union Township, Custer County, Nebraska =

West Union Township
- Township
- Location in Custer County
- Coordinates: 41°41′41″N 099°30′07″W
- Country: United States
- State: Nebraska
- County: Custer

Area
  - Total: 41.71 sq mi (108.03 km^{2})
  - Land: 41.71 sq mi (108.03 km^{2})
  - Water: 0 sq mi (0 km^{2}) 0%
- Elevation: 2,572 ft (784 m)

Population (2020)
  - Total: 73
  - Density: 1.8/sq mi (0.68/km^{2})
- ZIP code: 68874
- Area code: 308
- GNIS feature ID: 0838330

West Union Township is one of thirty-one townships in Custer County, Nebraska, United States. The population was 73 at the 2020 census. A 2021 estimate placed the township's population at 72.

== Notable people ==
- Fred N. Cummings, U.S. Representative from Colorado
