= Front Range Community College =

Multi-campus public college in Colorado, US

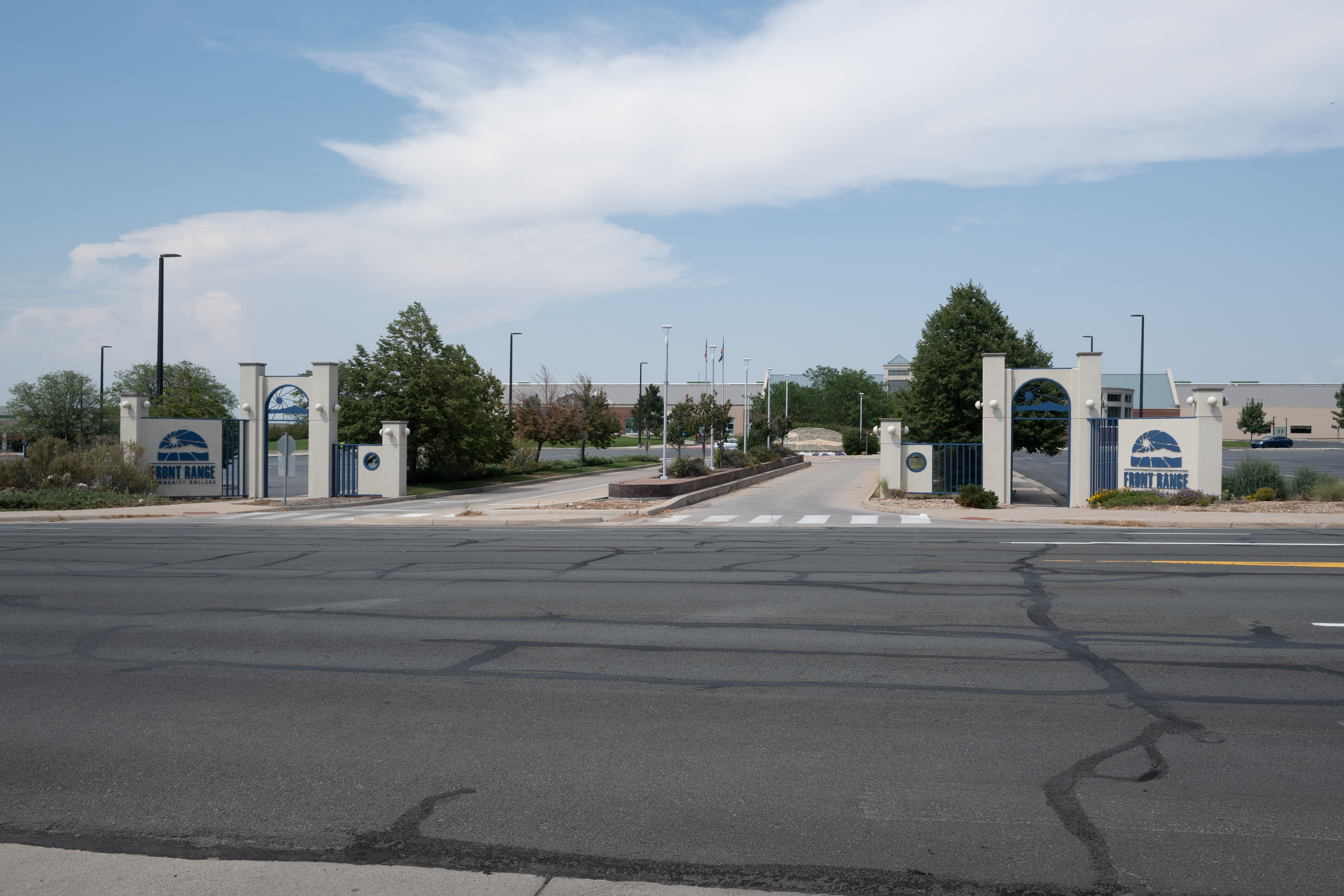
- Main entrance to the Westminster campus
- Former names: Community College of Denver, North Campus (1968–1983, Westminster Campus); Larimer County Voc-Tech Center (1972–1988, Larimer Campus)
- Type: Public community college
- Established: 1968
- Parent institution: Colorado Community College System
- Academic affiliations: Space-grant
- President: Dr. Colleen Simpson
- Faculty: 235 (full time), 921 (part time)
- Administrative staff: 393
- Students: 27,700
- Location: Westminster, Colorado, United States; 39°54′04″N 105°02′16″W
- Mascot: Wolves
- Website: Front Range Community College

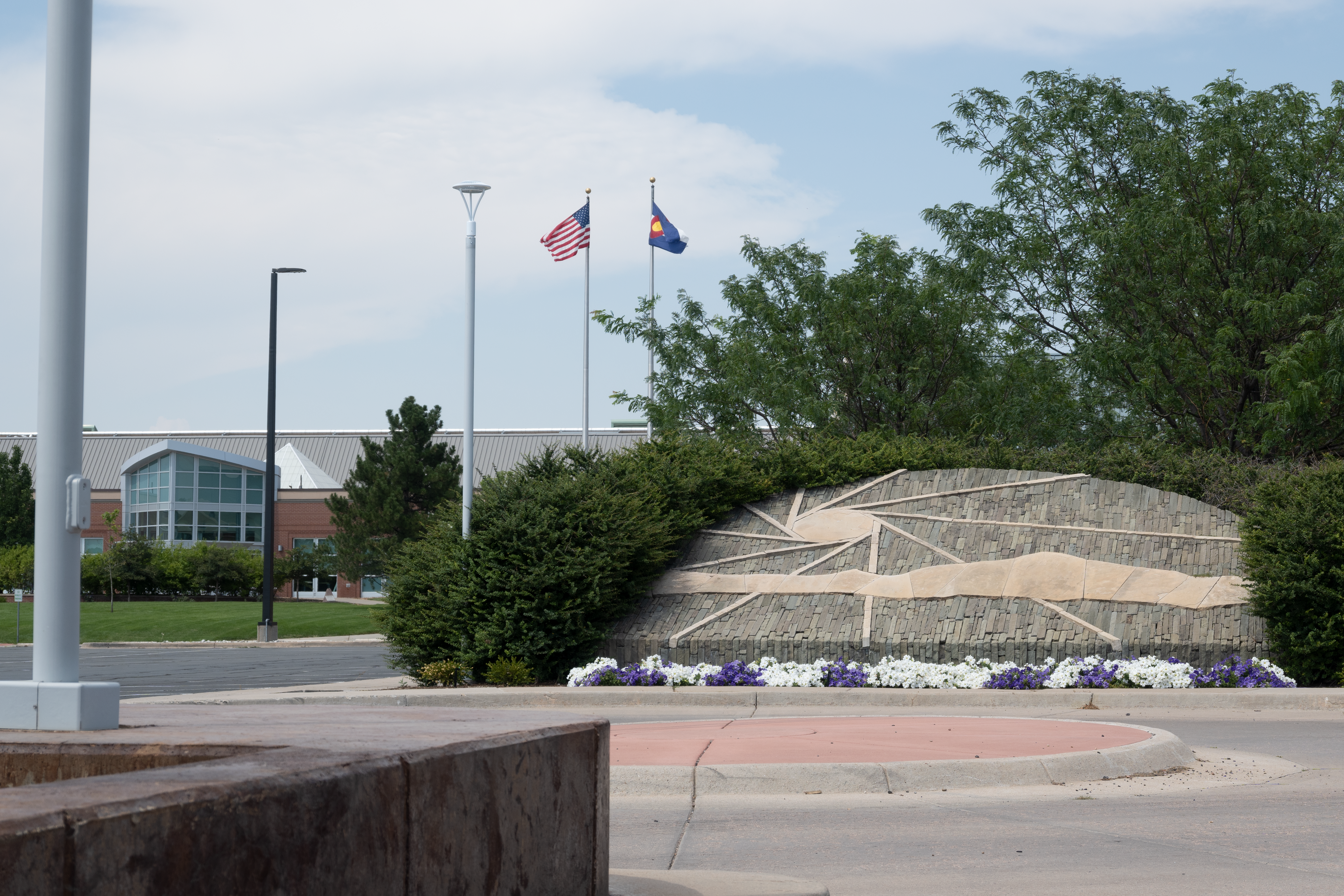
Westminster campus

Front Range Community College (FRCC) is a public community college with three campuses in Colorado, located in Westminster, Longmont, and Fort Collins. It is the largest community college in Colorado and the most popular transfer institution for the University of Colorado Boulder, Colorado State University, Metropolitan State University of Denver, and CSU Global. The average class size at FRCC is around 15 students.

Almost 6,000 FRCC students transfer to four-year colleges in an average year. The college also provides business training and continuing education to more than 5,000 people annually. FRCC recently made Newsweek's list of the top 100 schools in the U.S. for online learning, and the school offers approximately 500 online classes.

FRCC traces its heritage to the founding of the State Board for Community Colleges and Occupational Education in 1967, which in 1968 established the North Campus of the Community College of Denver as its first new creation. In 1983 the North Campus was renamed as Front Range Community College and became an independent institution in 1985. In 1988, the Larimer County Voc-Tech Center was incorporated as the Larimer Campus of FRCC. The college is accredited by the Higher Learning Commission.

== History ==
From 1968 to 1977, the college was located in facilities at East 62nd Avenue and Downing Street in Denver. In 1977, the college inaugurated a new building on 112th Avenue in Westminster, Colorado. When it opened, the Westminster Campus building was heated with an innovative solar system of over 4000 flat-plate solar thermal panels making it the largest solar-heated educational building in the world. The solar system operated until the solar panels were removed during a major building remodel in 1996, and now the facilities are heated with conventional methods.

During its first decades, the college principally offered career, vocational and technical training, with certificates and two-year associate degrees in many fields, including accounting, architectural technology, automotive repair, business, dental assisting, electronics, healthcare, machine drafting, machining, nursing, and welding. General studies programs in arts, science, and both general and developmental education were also offered. In 1997, FRCC transferred and began offering its machining program at the Rocky Mountain Manufacturing Academy, which was part of the now defunct Higher Education and Advanced Technology (HEAT) Center at the decommissioned Lowry Air Force Base in Aurora, Colorado. Today the college offers a mix of general academic and transfer courses as well as career and technical education offerings.

FRCC currently maintains campuses in Fort Collins and Longmont, and previously operated centers in Brighton and Loveland, which have since closed, in addition to the original Westminster campus and a highly developed online learning program. The college also operates its Precision Machining Program in the Advanced Technology Center in Longmont.

== Academics ==
The college has 30 programs that are guaranteed to transfer to public four-year colleges/universities in Colorado. Its 37 career/technical programs include a variety of business, high-tech manufacturing, design, computer-related, and health-care pathways.

FRCC offers almost 200 associate degrees and certificates, as well as three bachelor's degrees (in nursing, GIS and business for creative industries). FRCC has an astronomical observatory on each campus.

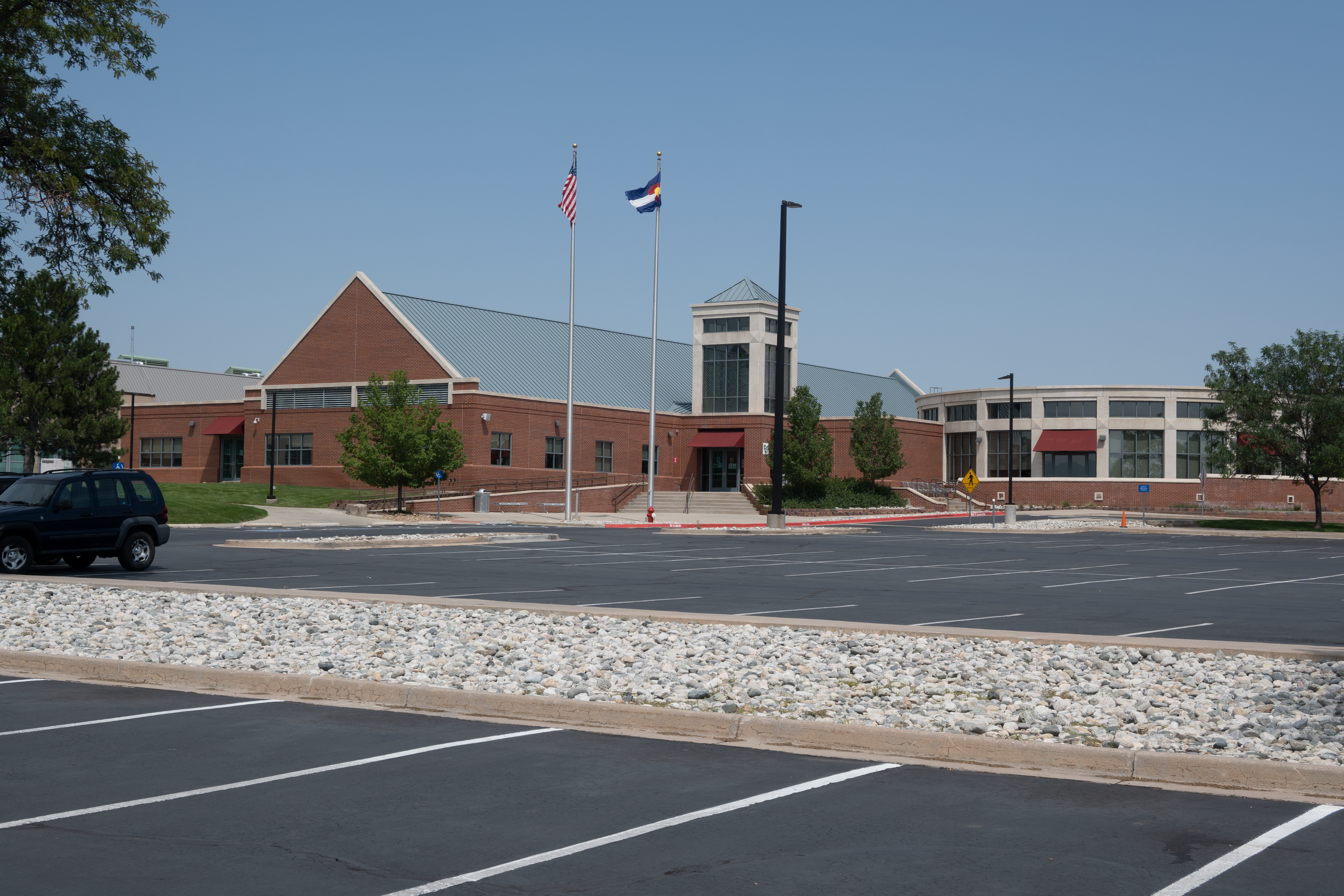
Westminster campus classes building.

In 2022, the college awarded 1,912 associate degrees and a 3,764 professional certificates. The median age of FRCC students is 23, with most students studying part-time and pursuing programs in liberal arts and sciences or career/technical fields.

== Demographics ==
FRCC currently has a student enrollment count of around 27,200. Almost half of FRCC students are the first in their family to go to college. 32% identify as students of color.
