= Spring Creek (Fort Collins, Colorado) =

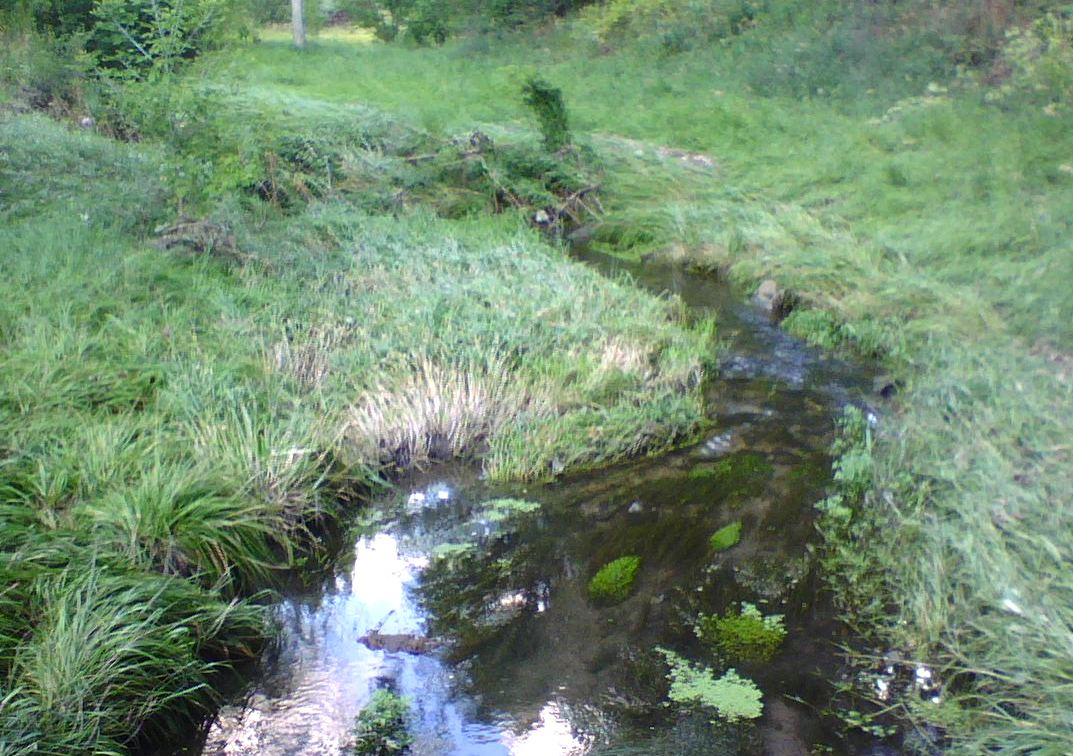
- Spring Creek in 2007 following minor flooding; note the effect of the water flow on nearby vegetation

Physical characteristics
- Source
  - coordinates: 40°31′48″N 105°08′30″W
- Mouth
  - location: Confluence with Cache la Poudre
  - coordinates: 40°34′08″N 105°01′39″W
  - elevation: 4,898 ft (1,493 m)

Basin features
- Progression: Cache la Poudre— South Platte—Platte— Missouri—Mississippi

Spring Creek is a 12.7-mile-long (20.4 km) tributary of the Cache La Poudre River in the state of Colorado in the United States.

Spring Creek begins north of Horsetooth Mountain within Horsetooth Mountain Park just west of Fort Collins, Colorado, and flows into Horsetooth Reservoir. After leaving Horsetooth Reservoir out of Spring Canyon Dam, Spring Creek flows through central Fort Collins just south of Colorado State University. For most of its passage through the city, it is paralleled by the city-maintained Spring Creek Trail.

The Spring Creek Trail follows Spring Creek through several parks in mid Fort Collins. It currently extends from Spring Canyon park at the southern end of Overland Trail to the confluence of Spring Creek and the Poudre River where it joins the Poudre Trail. The Spring Creek Trail extends through a new underpass of Taft Hill Road. This highly popular trail continues to Spring Canyon Community Park and the Pineridge Natural Area. The Spring Creek Trail is 6.6 miles.

== Spring Creek flood of 1997 ==
From July 27 to July 28, 1997, 14.5 inches (370 mm) of rain fell within the city of Fort Collins, causing Spring Creek to flow over its banks and into surrounding communities. The flash flood transformed this tiny creek into a torrent, killing five people and causing an estimated $200 million worth of damage to public and private property, making this event the city's worst natural disaster. The campus and academic buildings of Colorado State University was also severely damaged. Soon after the floods, President Clinton issued disaster declarations for 13 counties affected by the flood event, including Larimer County, which received $5.2 million in aid from FEMA for individual assistance. Colorado State University received $1.2 million in aid from FEMA to pay for repairs to damaged buildings. A hydrometeorological study revealed that the Horsetooth reservoir, which rose 20 in (50 cm) in response to the flood, produced a significant flood reduction benefit.

The Spring Creek flood spawned a national weather-watcher program called CoCoRaHS, the Community Collaborative Rain, Hail and Snow Network, which uses volunteers to measure rain, hail and snow.

== See also ==
- List of Colorado rivers
- News story and photos from the flood.
