= Grandview Cemetery, Fort Collins =

Cemetery in Larimer County, Colorado, US

Coordinates: 40°35′14″N 105°6′37″W

Grandview Cemetery
- Interactive map of Grandview Cemetery

Details
- Established: 1887
- Location: Fort Collins, Colorado
- Country: United States
- Size: 45 acres (18 ha)
- No. of graves: Over 22,000

Grandview Cemetery is a cemetery in Fort Collins, Larimer County, Colorado.

The land for the cemetery was bought in 1887. At the time, it was west of the city limits of Fort Collins. Mountain Home Cemetery had been used prior to this, but it was closer to town, and with the population of Fort Collins rapidly expanding, it was deemed necessary to find another location further from town. The remains buried at Mountain Home were gradually transferred to Grandview beginning in late 1887 or early 1888 and by the 1920s, the site of the former cemetery at Mountain Home had been converted to a playground.

The first interment at Grandview took place on November 21, 1887, when a three-month-old infant named Felix Scoville was buried there.

As of 2009, Grandview consisted of approximately 45 acres (180,000 m^{2}) development, 34,000 grave spaces, 70 crypts, 336 niches, and over 22,000 burials.

== Notable burials ==
- James B. Arthur (1831–1905), Colorado state senator
- Bert Christman (1915–1942), cartoonist and naval aviator
- Fred N. Cummings (1864–1952), American rancher and democrat
- Jean Bethke Elshtain (1941–2013), scholar of religion and political philosophy
- William Silas Hill (1886–1972), U.S. representative
- Henderson C. Howard (1839–1919), Union army soldier and Pennsylvania sheriff
- Mark D. Miller (1891–1970), American photographer
- Charles Bateman Timberlake (1851–1941), U.S representative
