= Fort Collins Museum of Discovery =

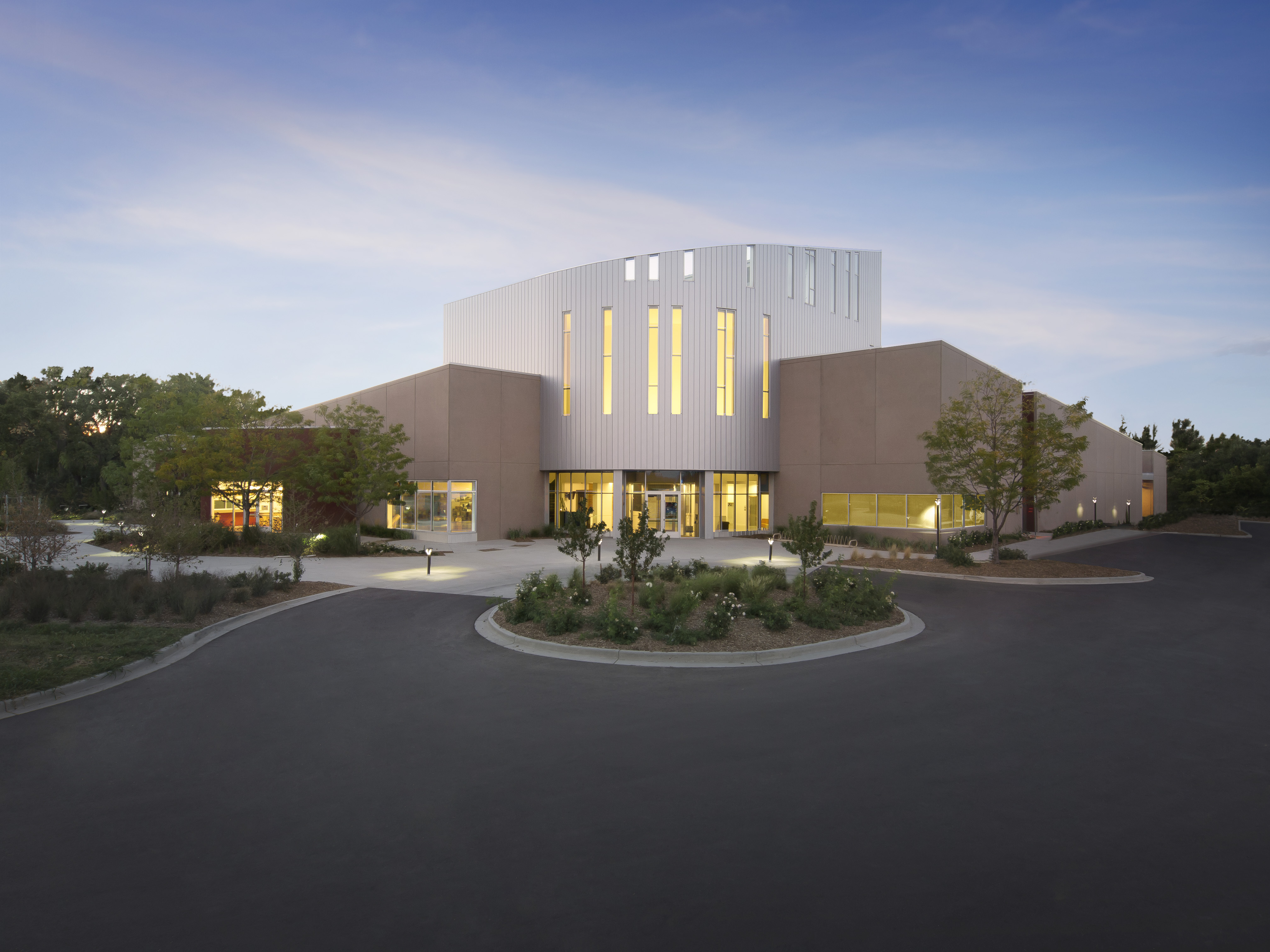
- Established: 2012
- Location: Fort Collins, Colorado
- Coordinates: 40.5849°N 105.0737°W
- Type: Science and Local History
- Visitors: 121,354
- Director: Cheryl Donaldson, Executive Co-director; Shannon Quist, Executive Co-director
- Website: fcmod.org

Fort Collins Museum of Discovery is an all-ages, science, history and cultural museum established in 2008 through a public-private partnership between the City of Fort Collins' Fort Collins Museum and nonprofit Discovery Science Center. The museum, which opened in November 2012 and drew approximately one million visitors in its first decade, is located at 408 Mason Court, Fort Collins, CO 80524.

Fort Collins Museum of Discovery archives house photographs, books, and other materials covering local history including those from the Johnson site in Larimer County, Colorado.
