= Fort Collins, Colorado =

Home rule city and seat of Larimer County, Colorado, United States

- Home rule city
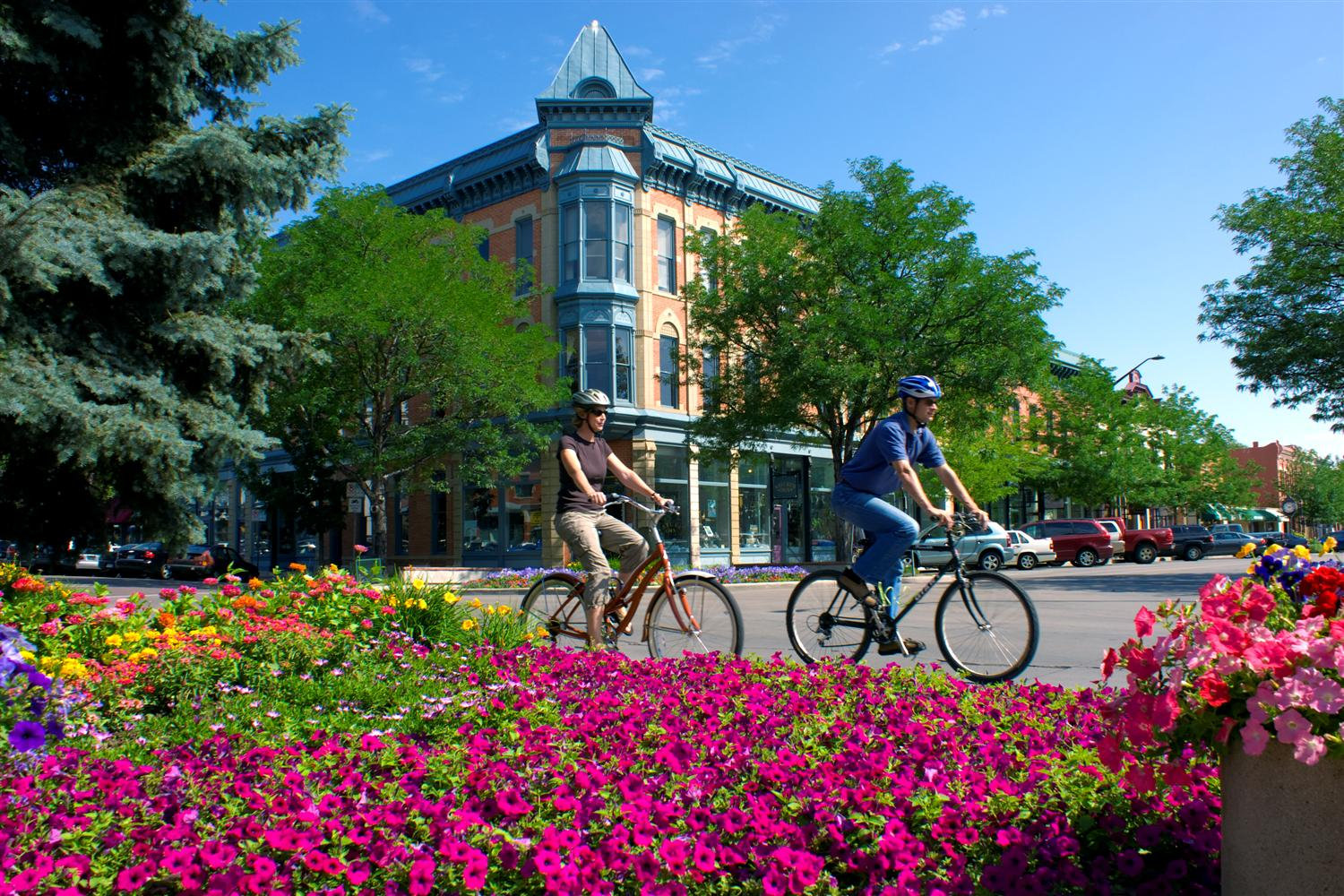
- Downtown "Old Town" Fort Collins

- Flag
- Interactive map of Fort Collins, Colorado
- Location within Colorado Location within the United States
- Coordinates: 40°32′51″N 105°03′57″W
- Country: United States
- State: Colorado
- County: Larimer
- Commissioned: 1864
- Incorporated: February 12, 1883
- Named for: William O. Collins

Government
  - Type: Home rule city

Area
  - Home rule city: 58.473 sq mi (151.444 km^{2})
  - Land: 57.212 sq mi (148.179 km^{2})
  - Water: 1.261 sq mi (3.265 km^{2})
- Elevation: 4,997 ft (1,523 m)

Population (2020)
  - Home rule city: 169,810
  - Estimate (2024): 170,924
  - Rank: 4th in Colorado; 154th in the United States
  - Density: 2,968/sq mi (1,146/km^{2})
  - Urban: 326,332 (US: 123rd)
  - Urban density: 2,770/sq mi (1,068/km^{2})
  - Metro: 359,066 (US: 151st)
  - Front Range: 5,055,344
- Time zone: UTC−07:00 (MST)
  - Summer (DST): UTC−06:00 (MDT)
- ZIP code: 80521–80528
- Area codes: 970/748
- GNIS city ID: 2410526
- FIPS code: 08-27425
- Website: fortcollins.gov

Fort Collins is a home rule city in Larimer County, Colorado, United States, and serves as the county seat and most populous municipality of the county. It is the fourth-most populous city in Colorado with a population of 169,810 in the 2020 census, while the Fort Collins–Loveland metropolitan area has an estimated 375,000 residents.

Situated on the Cache La Poudre River along the Colorado Front Range, Fort Collins is located 60 mi (97 km) north of the Colorado State Capitol in Denver and is a major city of the Front Range Urban Corridor. It is a prominent college town, home to Colorado State University, a public research university and the second-largest university by enrollment in Colorado.

== History ==
The Northern Arapaho were centered in the Cache la Poudre River Valley near present-day Fort Collins. Friday, who attended school in St. Louis, Missouri in his youth, was a leader of the band of Arapahos as well as an interpreter, negotiator, and peacemaker. He made friends of white settlers who moved into the area, but was pushed out of Colorado in the 1860s.

Fort Collins was founded as a military outpost of the United States Army in 1864. It succeeded a previous encampment, known as Camp Collins, on the Cache la Poudre River, near what is known today as Laporte. Camp Collins was erected during the Indian wars of the mid-1860s to protect the Overland mail route that had been recently relocated through the region. Travelers crossing the county on the Overland Trail would camp there, but a flood destroyed the camp in June 1864. Afterward, the commander of the fort wrote to the commandant of Fort Laramie in southeast Wyoming, Colonel William O. Collins, suggesting that a site several miles farther down the river would make a good location for the fort. The post was manned originally by two companies of the 11th Ohio Volunteer Cavalry and never had walls. The Fort Collins, Colorado Territory, post office opened on June 27, 1865.

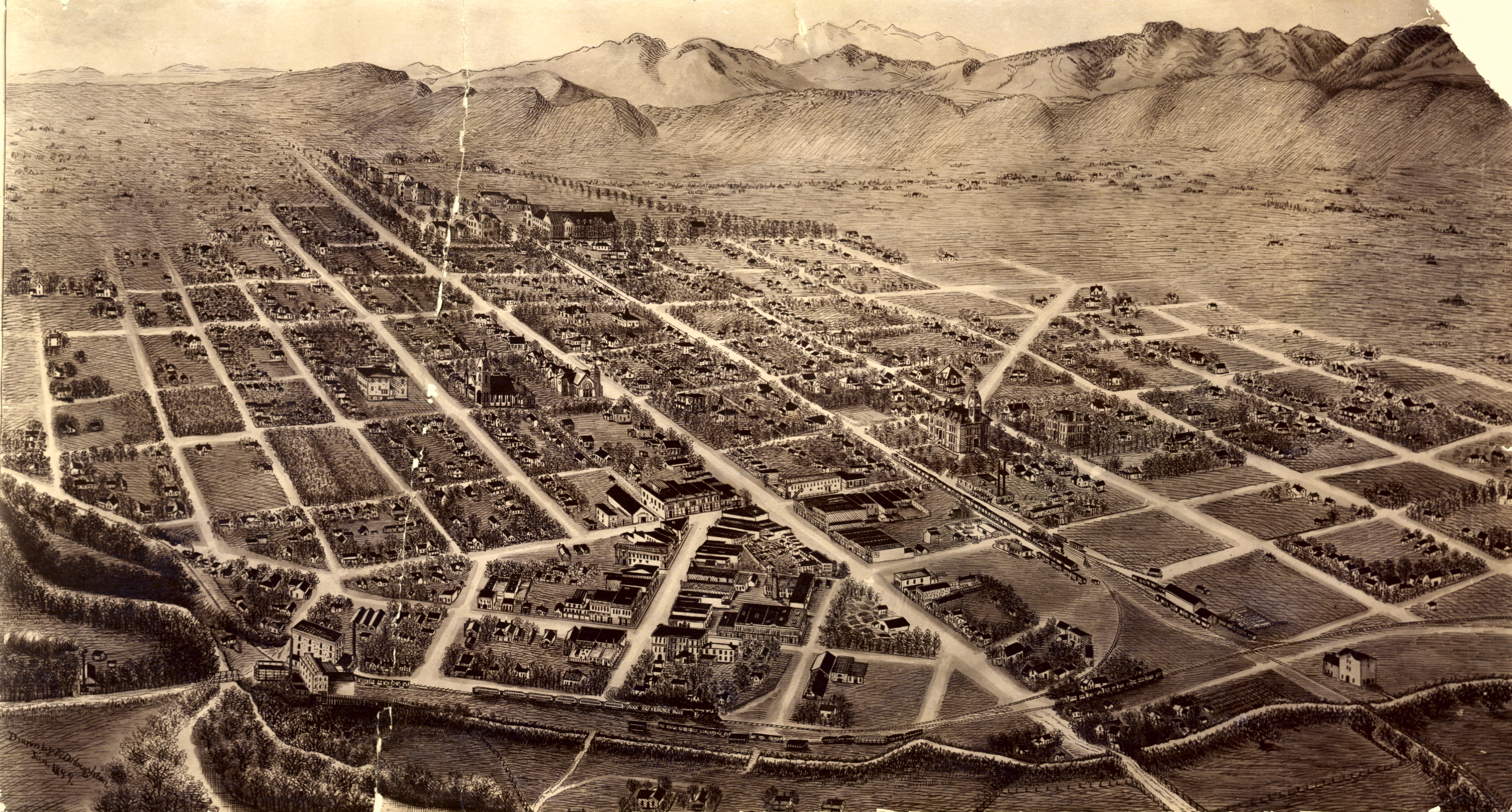
Bird's-eye view of Fort Collins in 1899

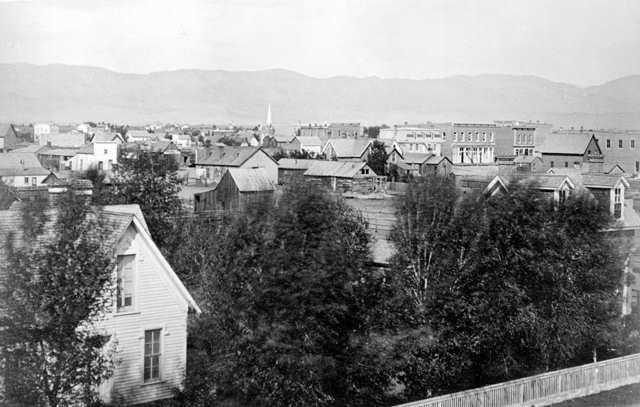
Fort Collins, facing west (1875)

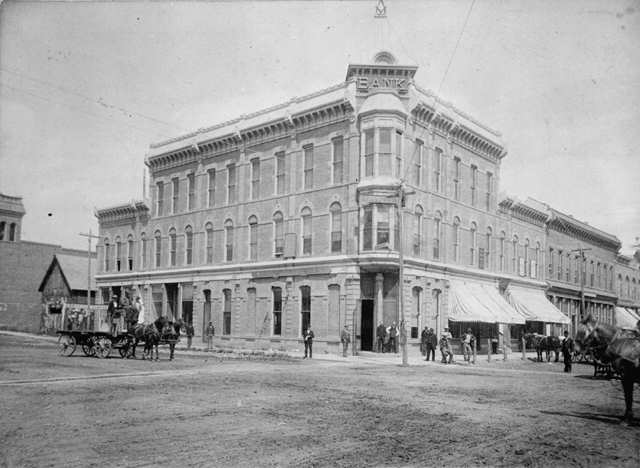
Poudre Valley Bank, at Linden and Walnut, in Fort Collins (1908)

Settlers began arriving in the vicinity of the fort nearly immediately. The fort was decommissioned in 1867. The original fort site is now adjacent to the present historic "Old Town" portion of the city. The first school and church opened in 1866, and the town was platted in 1867. The civilian population of Fort Collins, led by local businessman Joseph Mason, led an effort to relocate the county seat to Fort Collins from LaPorte, and they were successful in 1868.

The city's first population boom came in 1872, with the establishment of an agricultural colony. Hundreds of settlers arrived, developing lots just south of the original Old Town. Tension between new settlers and earlier inhabitants led to political divisions in the new town, which was incorporated in 1873. Although the Colorado Agricultural College was founded in 1870, the first classes were held in 1879.

The Town of Fort Collins was incorporated on February 12, 1883. The 1880s saw the construction of a number of elegant homes and commercial buildings and the growth of a distinctive identity for Fort Collins. Stone quarrying, sugar-beet farming, chestnut farming and the slaughter of sheep were among the area's earliest industries. During this the early 1800s many early settlers planted new plants such as beets, chestnuts; specifically horse-chestnuts (Aesculus hippocastanum), an ornamental species from the Balkans. These planted crops, served as an essential stepping stone in the change of the unique agricultural landscape that emerged in the Front Range. Beet tops, an industry supported by the college and its associated agricultural experiment station, proved to be an excellent and abundant food for local sheep, and by the early 1900s the area was being referred to as the "Lamb feeding capital of the world". In 1901 the Great Western sugar processing plant was built in the neighboring city of Loveland.

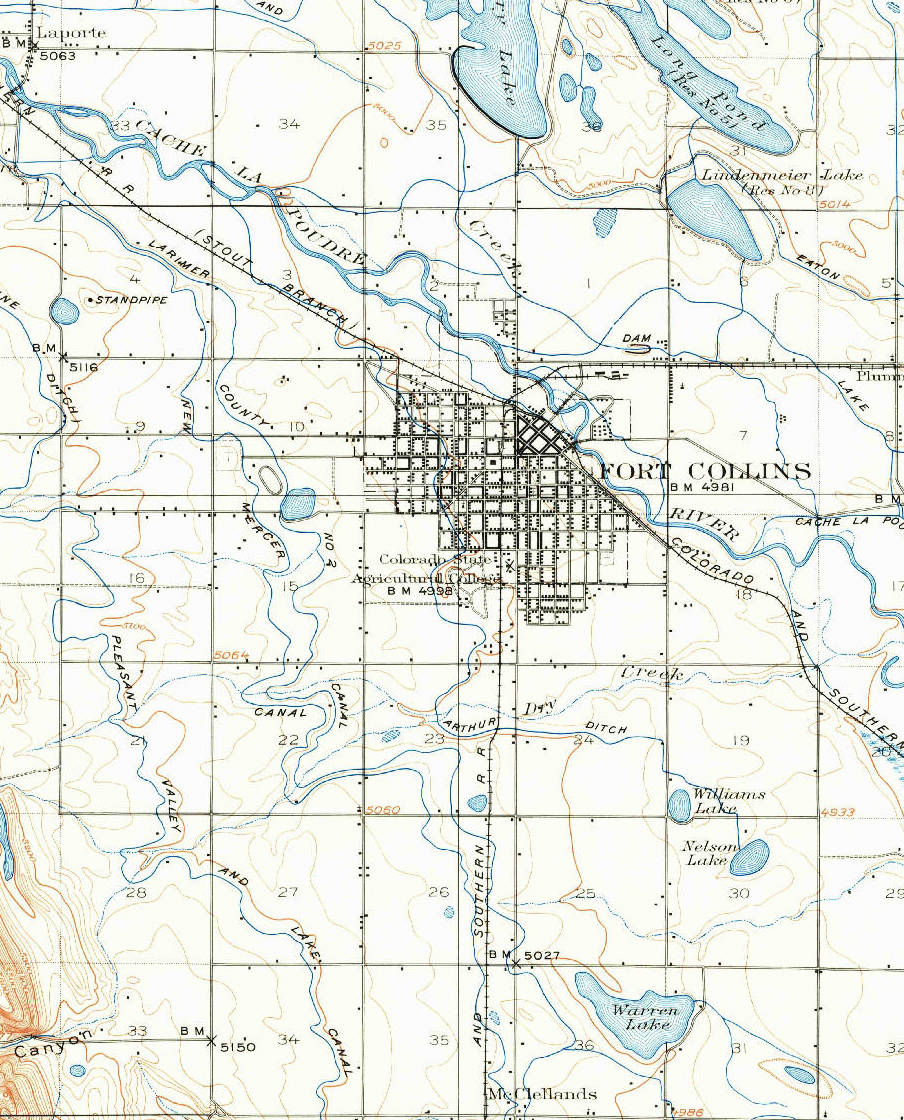
The region in 1906

Although the city was affected by the Great Depression and simultaneous drought, it nevertheless experienced slow and steady growth throughout the early part off the twentieth century. During the decade following World War II, the population doubled and an era of economic prosperity occurred. Old buildings were razed to make way for new, modern structures. Along with revitalization came many changes, including the closing of the Great Western sugar factory in 1955, and a new city charter, adopting a council-manager form of government in 1954. Similarly, Colorado State University's enrollment doubled during the 1960s, making it the city's primary economic force by the end of the century.

Fort Collins gained a reputation as a very conservative city in the twentieth century, with a prohibition of alcoholic beverages, a contentious political issue in the town's early decades, being retained from the late 1890s until student activism helped bring it to an end in 1969. During that same period, civil rights activism and anti-war disturbances heightened tensions in the city, including the burning of several buildings on the CSU campus.

During the late 20th century, Fort Collins expanded rapidly to the south, adding new development, including several regional malls. Management of city growth patterns became a political priority during the 1980s, as well as the revitalization of Fort Collins' Old Town with the creation of a Downtown Development Authority. In late July 1997, the city experienced a flash flood after and during a 31-hour period when 10–14 in (250–360 mm) of rain fell. The rainfall was the heaviest on record for an urban area of Colorado. Five people were killed and $5 million in damages were dealt to the city. The waters flooded Colorado State University's library and brought about $140 million in damages to the institution.

== Geography ==
Fort Collins is situated at the base of the Rocky Mountain foothills of the northern Front Range, approximately 60 miles (97 km) north of Denver, Colorado, and 45 miles (72 km) south of Cheyenne, Wyoming. Elevation is 4,982 ft (1,519 m) above sea level. Geographic landmarks include Horsetooth Reservoir and Horsetooth Mountain—so named because of a tooth-shaped granite rock that dominates the city's western skyline. Longs Peak can also clearly be seen on a clear day to the southwest of the city.

The Cache La Poudre River and Spring Creek run through Fort Collins.

At the 2020 United States census, the town had a total area of 37,423 acres (151.444 km^{2}) including 807 acres (3.265 km^{2}) of water.

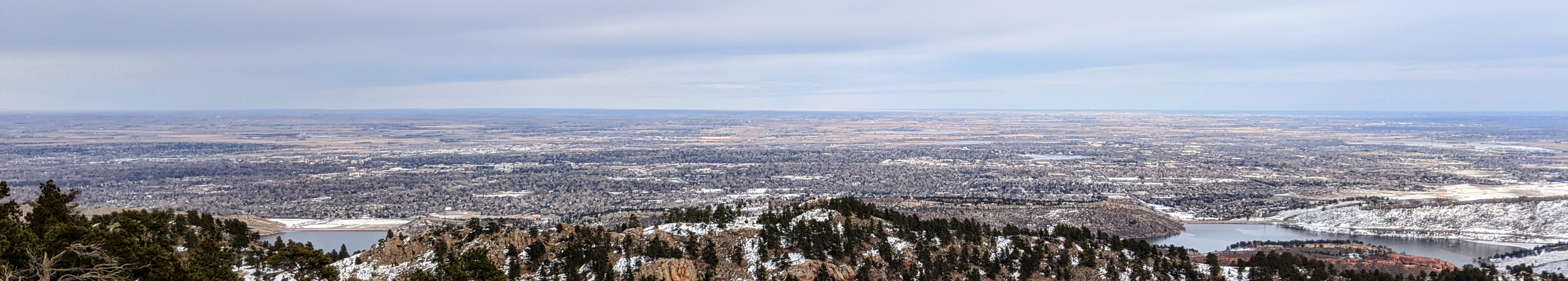
Fort Collins as seen from the top of Horsetooth Mountain

=== Climate ===
Fort Collins has a cold semi-arid climate (Köppen climate classification BSk). Its climate is characterized by warm to hot summers and long and moderately cold winters (with frequent warm spells due to downslope winds, and somewhat less common intervals of severe cold). The average temperature in December, the coldest month, is 31.1 °F (−0.5 °C). Annual snowfall averages 51.4 inches (1.31 m), and can occur from early September through the end of May. Average precipitation overall is 15.88 inches (403 mm).

Climate data for Fort Collins, Colorado, 1991–2020 normals, extremes 1893–present
Month	Jan	Feb	Mar	Apr	May	Jun	Jul	Aug	Sep	Oct	Nov	Dec	Year
Record high °F (°C)	75 (24)	77 (25)	91 (33)	89 (32)	97 (36)	102 (39)	103 (39)	102 (39)	99 (37)	88 (31)	81 (27)	76 (24)	103 (39)
Mean maximum °F (°C)	63.6 (17.6)	65.9 (18.8)	73.9 (23.3)	80.2 (26.8)	87.3 (30.7)	94.5 (34.7)	97.4 (36.3)	95.1 (35.1)	91.2 (32.9)	82.3 (27.9)	72 (22)	62.7 (17.1)	98.2 (36.8)
Mean daily maximum °F (°C)	45.0 (7.2)	46.8 (8.2)	56.4 (13.6)	62.5 (16.9)	70.9 (21.6)	81.8 (27.7)	87.4 (30.8)	85.0 (29.4)	77.4 (25.2)	64.3 (17.9)	52.5 (11.4)	44.0 (6.7)	64.5 (18.1)
Daily mean °F (°C)	31.6 (−0.2)	33.8 (1.0)	42.4 (5.8)	49.0 (9.4)	57.5 (14.2)	67.3 (19.6)	73.1 (22.8)	70.7 (21.5)	62.7 (17.1)	50.2 (10.1)	39.3 (4.1)	31.1 (−0.5)	50.7 (10.4)
Mean daily minimum °F (°C)	18.3 (−7.6)	20.7 (−6.3)	28.5 (−1.9)	35.4 (1.9)	44.1 (6.7)	52.8 (11.6)	58.7 (14.8)	56.5 (13.6)	48.0 (8.9)	36.1 (2.3)	26.1 (−3.3)	18.3 (−7.6)	37.0 (2.8)
Mean minimum °F (°C)	−1.9 (−18.8)	1.6 (−16.9)	10.9 (−11.7)	21.8 (−5.7)	31.1 (−0.5)	42.8 (6.0)	51.6 (10.9)	48.3 (9.1)	34.8 (1.6)	19.4 (−7.0)	7.7 (−13.5)	−0.2 (−17.9)	−7.7 (−22.1)
Record low °F (°C)	−38 (−39)	−41 (−41)	−31 (−35)	−10 (−23)	12 (−11)	29 (−2)	36 (2)	32 (0)	18 (−8)	−8 (−22)	−21 (−29)	−35 (−37)	−41 (−41)
Average precipitation inches (mm)	0.41 (10)	0.47 (12)	1.31 (33)	2.10 (53)	2.72 (69)	1.90 (48)	1.63 (41)	1.45 (37)	1.43 (36)	1.25 (32)	0.74 (19)	0.47 (12)	15.88 (402)
Average snowfall inches (cm)	6.7 (17)	7.6 (19)	9.4 (24)	6.2 (16)	1.6 (4.1)	0 (0)	0 (0)	0 (0)	0.7 (1.8)	4.1 (10)	7.6 (19)	7.5 (19)	51.4 (129.9)
Average precipitation days (≥ 0.01 in)	3.9	5.1	6	9	12	9.4	9.4	8.8	7.2	6.2	4.8	4.1	85.9
Average snowy days (≥ 0.1 in)	4.3	5.5	4.5	3.1	0.6	0	0	0	0.3	1.3	3.6	4.3	27.5
Source 1: NOAA
Source 2: National Weather Service

== Demographics ==
Historical population
Census	Pop.	Note	%±
1880	1,356		—
1890	2,011		48.3%
1900	3,053		51.8%
1910	8,210		168.9%
1920	8,755		6.6%
1930	11,489		31.2%
1940	12,251		6.6%
1950	14,937		21.9%
1960	25,027		67.6%
1970	43,337		73.2%
1980	65,092		50.2%
1990	87,758		34.8%
2000	118,652		35.2%
2010	143,986		21.4%
2020	169,810		17.9%
2024 (est.)	170,924	▲	0.7%
U.S. Decennial Census

Fort Collins is the fourth most populous city in Colorado and the 156th most populous city in the United States. The Census Bureau estimates that the city's population was 161,175 in 2015, the population of the Fort Collins-Loveland Metropolitan Statistical Area was 310,487 (151st most populous MSA), and the population of the Front Range Urban Corridor was 4,495,181.

As of the census of 2000, there were 118,652 people, 45,882 households, and 25,785 families residing in the city. The population density was 2,549.3 inhabitants per square mile (984.3/km^{2}). There were 47,755 housing units at an average density of 1,026 units per square mile (396 units/km^{2}). The racial makeup of the city was 82.4% White, 3.01% Black or African American, 0.6% Native American, 2.48% Asian, 0.12% Pacific Islander, 3.61% from other races, and 2.53% from two or more races. Hispanic or Latino residents of any race were 10.79% of the population.

There were 45,882 households, out of which 29% had children under the age of 18 living with them, 44.9% were married couples living together, 7.9% had a female householder with no husband present, and 43.8% were non-families. 26% of all households were made up of individuals, and 5.9% had someone living alone who was 65 years of age or older. The average household size was 2.45 and the average family size was 3.01.

In the city, the population was spread out, with 21.5% under the age of 18, 22.1% from 18 to 24, 31.5% from 25 to 44, 17% from 45 to 64, and 7.9% who were 65 years of age or older. The median age was 28 years. For every 100 females, there were 100.9 males. For every 100 females age 18 and over, there were 99.7 males.

The median income for a household in the city was $64,459, and the median income for a family was $110,332. Males had a median income of $60,856 versus $48,385 for females. The per capita income for the city was $32,133. About 5.5% of families and 14% of the population were below the poverty line, including 8.3% of those under age 18 and 5.8% of those age 65 or over.

=== 2020 census ===
Fort Collins, Colorado – Racial and ethnic composition Note: the US Census treats Hispanic/Latino as an ethnic category. This table excludes Latinos from the racial categories and assigns them to a separate category. Hispanics/Latinos may be of any race.
Race / ethnicity (NH = Non-Hispanic)	Pop. 2000	Pop. 2010	Pop. 2020	% 2000	% 2010	% 2020
White alone (NH)	101,384	119,695	130,620	85.45%	83.13%	76.92%
Black or African American alone (NH)	1,103	1,583	2,292	0.93%	1.1%	1.35%
Native American or Alaska Native alone (NH)	518	571	724	0.44%	0.4%	0.43%
Asian alone (NH)	2,909	4,161	6,038	2.45%	2.89%	3.56%
Pacific Islander alone (NH)	108	110	137	0.09%	0.08%	0.08%
Some other race alone (NH)	154	218	833	0.13%	0.15%	0.49%
Mixed race or multi-racial (NH)	2,074	3,076	8,163	1.75%	2.14%	4.81%
Hispanic or Latino (any race)	10,402	14,572	21,003	8.77%	10.12%	12.37%
Total	118,652	143,986	169,810	100%	100%	100%

== Economy ==
=== Employment ===
As of July 2025, Fort Collins had nearly 200,000 employed persons.

Fort Collins hosts federal government employees including some USDA offices. As of 2025, federal agencies based in Fort Collins employed over 5000 people across Colorado, with over 10 federal buildings used as offices.

According to the city's 2024 Annual Comprehensive Financial Report, the top employers are:

#	Employer	# of employees
1	Colorado State University	8,850
2	University of Colorado Hospital Authority	5,900
3	Poudre R-1 School District	4,600
4	City of Fort Collins	2,550
5	Larimer County	2,550
6	Woodward, Inc.	1,350
7	Broadcom Inc.	1,050
8	Tolmar Inc	750
9	Front Range Community College	750
10	Orthopaedic & Spine Center of the Rockies	700

Regional economic development partners include the City of Fort Collins Economic Health Office, Northern Colorado Economic Development Corporation, Small Business Development Center, and Rocky Mountain Innovation Initiative (RMI2).

=== Major industries and commercial activity ===
Fort Collins' economy has a mix of manufacturing and service-related businesses. Fort Collins manufacturing includes Woodward Governor, Anheuser-Busch, Walker Mowers, and Otterbox. Many high-tech companies have relocated to Fort Collins because of the resources of Colorado State University and its research facilities. Hewlett-Packard, Intel, AMD, Broadcom, Beckman Coulter, Microsoft, Rubicon Water and Pelco all have offices in Fort Collins. Other industries include clean energy, bioscience, and agri-tech businesses.

=== Retail ===
The city's major shopping mall is The Shops at Foothills.

=== Sustainability programs ===
FortZED was a zero energy district encompassing the Downtown area of Fort Collins and the main campus of Colorado State University. The district's public-private partnerships employed smart grid and renewable energy technologies to manage the local use and supply of energy. FortZED relied upon energy demand management techniques to encourage use of energy at the most efficient times.

Federal, state, and local funding made the project a reality. The U.S. Department of Energy contributed $6.3 million and the Colorado Department of Local Affairs provided $778,000. Locally, private companies and foundations committed nearly $8 million.

The program ended in 2017 after a majority of its projects had been completed. There are currently no new sustainability programs in progress.

=== Brewing ===
Fort Collins has over 20 breweries. Notable breweries in the city include Anheuser-Busch, New Belgium Brewing Company, and Odell Brewing Company. The local chamber of commerce estimates that in 2010, the industry generated $309.9 million in output, 2,488 jobs and $141.9 million of local payrolls in Larimer County.

== Arts and culture ==
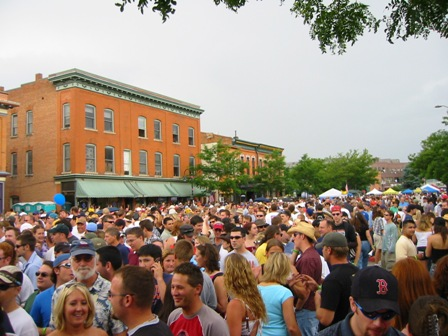
The 2004 Colorado Brewers Festival in Fort Collins

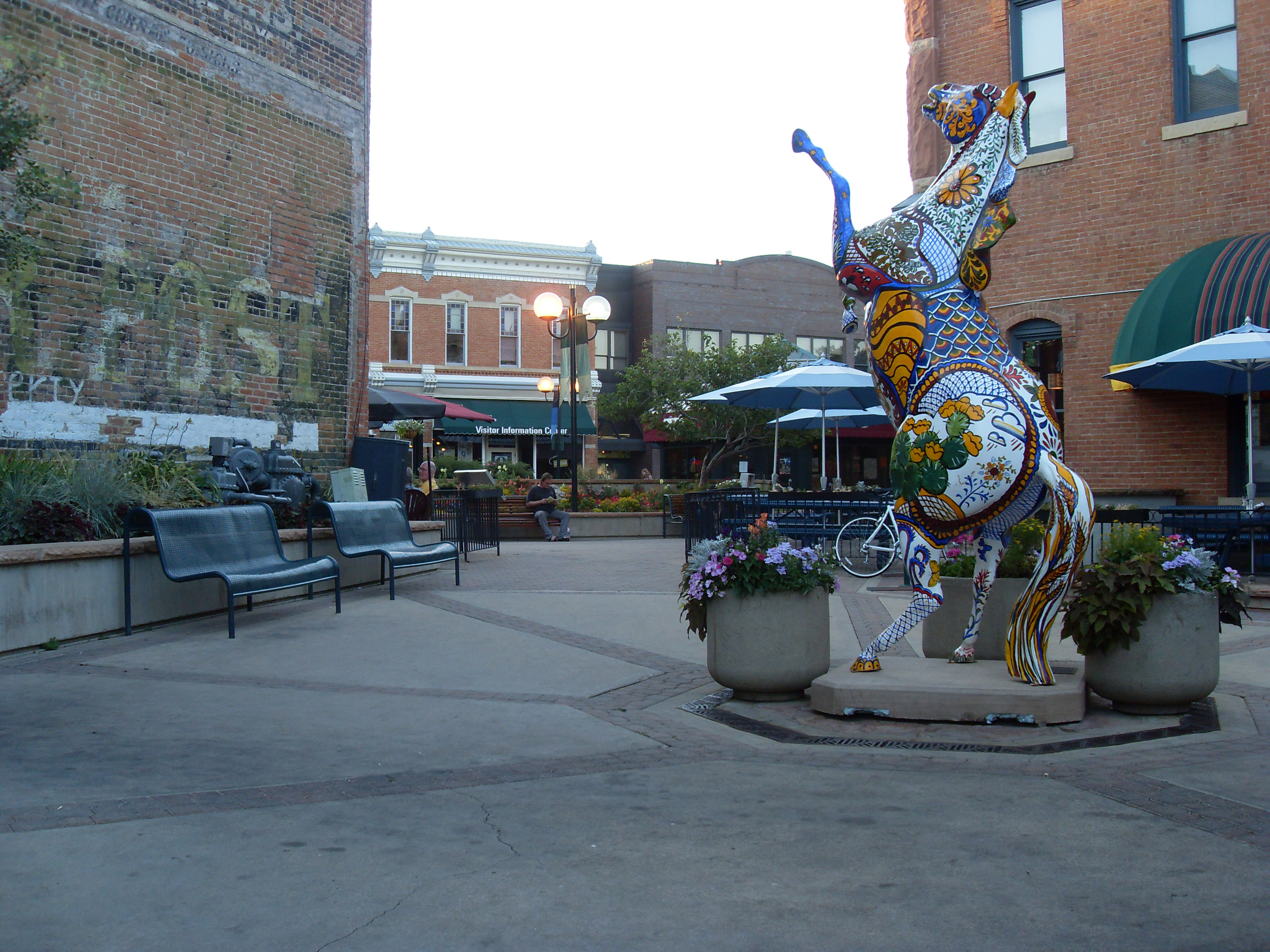
Fort Collins historic district

Much of Fort Collins's culture is centered around the students of Colorado State University. The Downtown Business Association hosts a number of small and large festivals each year in the historic Downtown district, including Bohemian Nights at NewWestFest in late summer (permanently discontinued in 2021) which featured local cuisine, music, and businesses. The Fort Collins Lincoln Center is home to the Fort Collins Symphony Orchestra and regularly attracts national touring companies of off-Broadway plays.

Brewing and cycling figure in local culture. The Colorado Brewer's Festival is held in late June annually in Fort Collins. The festival features beers from as many as 45 brewers from the state of Colorado and averages around 30,000 attendees. New Belgium Brewing Company hosts the Tour de Fat annually which draws over 20,000 people riding bikes and dressing in costume.

The Colorado Marathon is a yearly event running down the Poudre Canyon and finishing in downtown Fort Collins. The FORTitude 10K run, a partner running event of the Bolder Boulder, is held on Labor Day each year. The Horsetooth Half Marathon has been a fixture of the local running scene since 1973.

The Fort Collins Museum, established in 1941, is a regional center focusing on the culture and history of Fort Collins and the surrounding area. The Fort Collins Museum houses over 30,000 artifacts and features temporary and permanent exhibits, on-going educational programs and events, and is home to four historic structures located in the outdoor Heritage Courtyard.

The arts are represented by The Center for Fine Art Photography, University Center for the Arts, Fort Collins Museum of Art (FCMOA), and the Bas Bleu Theatre Company. The Arts Incubator of the Rockies (AIR), founded in Fort Collins in 2012, was acquired in 2016 by Berea College in Kentucky, where it became part of the College Crafts Program.

== Parks and recreation ==
The city contains 875 acres (354 ha) of developed park areas, which include tennis courts, disc golf courses, golf courses, dog parks, baseball diamonds, basketball courts, walking trails, skate parks, and picnic shelters. There are six community parks: City Park, Edora Park, Fossil Creek Park, Lee Martinez Park, Rolland Moore Park, and Spring Canyon Park. Whitewater Park and Poudre Trail are located alongside the Poudre River. The Gardens on Spring Creek is an 18-acre (7.3 ha) botanical garden that features themed gardens. Soapstone Prairie Natural Area features the Lindenmeier site, a stratified multi-component archaeological site notable for its Folsom component.

== Government ==
Fort Collins has a council-manager form of government. The mayor, who serves a two-year term and stands for election in municipal elections held in odd-numbered years, presides over a seven-member City Council. The current mayor of Fort Collins is Emily Francis, who was elected to her first term in November 2025. The six remaining council members are elected from districts for staggered four-year terms.

Fort Collins is the largest city in Colorado's 2nd Congressional district, and is represented in Congress by Representative Joe Neguse. On the state level, the city lies in the 14th district of the Colorado Senate, represented by Cathy Kipp and is split between the 52nd and 53rd districts of the Colorado House of Representatives, represented by Yara Zokaie and Andrew Boesenecker, respectively. All three of Fort Collins' state legislators are Democrats. Fort Collins is additionally the county seat of Larimer County, and houses county offices and courts.

== Education ==
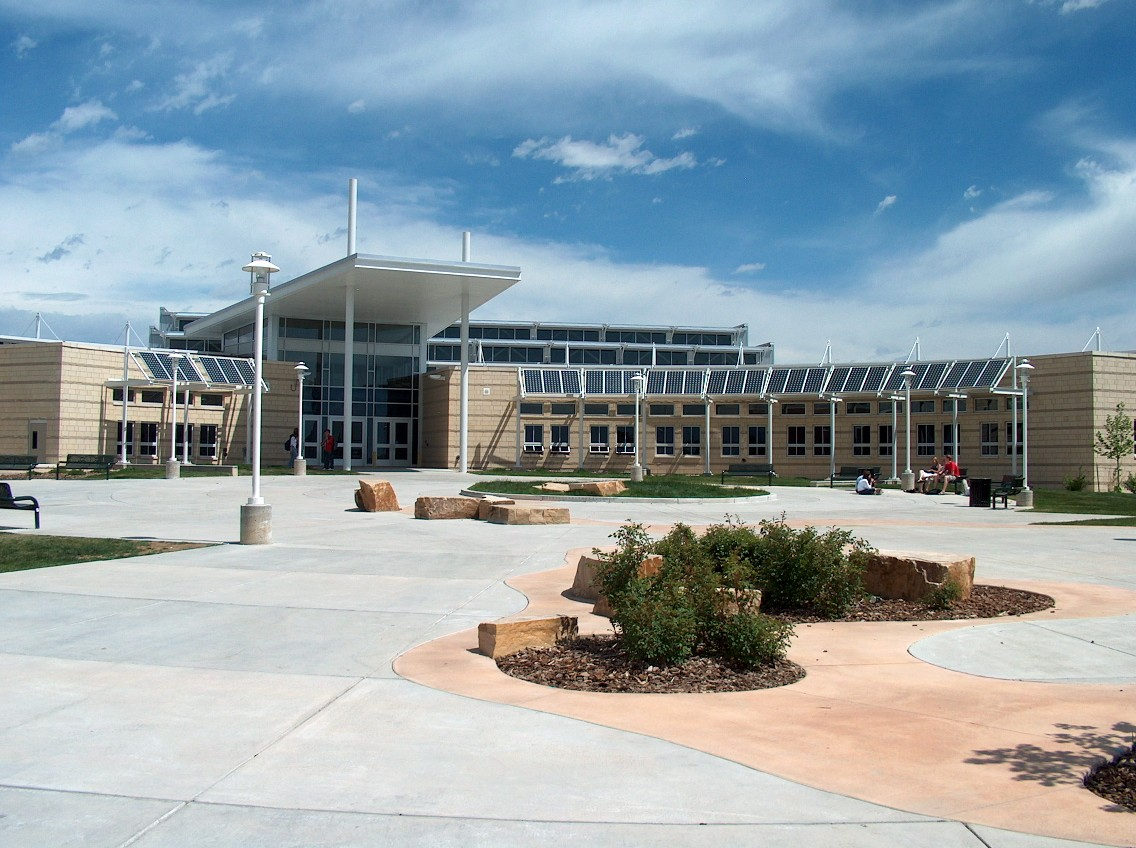
Fossil Ridge High School

Public K–12 education is provided through Poudre School District (PSD). The district operates and manages the public schools in the city of Fort Collins, as well as in the surrounding towns of Wellington, Timnath, Windsor, Laporte, and Livermore. The district is one of the fastest growing in Northern Colorado, adding 400–500 students each year. To accommodate growth, the district plans to build three new schools in the next few years.

Poudre School District includes four comprehensive high schools that serve neighborhoods around Fort Collins, including Fort Collins High School, Rocky Mountain High School, Poudre High School, Fossil Ridge High School. The district also operates four alternative high schools: Centennial High School, Polaris School for Expeditionary Learning, Poudre Community Academy and Poudre School District Global Academy, a dual in-person/online school. Additionally, four public charter schools are chartered through PSD, including Ridgeview Classical Schools, and Liberty Common High School, Mountain Sage Community School and Fort Collins Montessori School.

The Poudre School District is also home to ten middle schools (Lesher Middle IB World School, Blevins Middle School, Boltz Middle School, Cache La Poudre Middle School, Kinard Core Knowledge Middle School, Lincoln IB World Middle School, Polaris Expeditionary Learning School, Preston Middle School, Webber Middle School, and Wellington Middle School) and 32 elementary schools.

In addition to PSD schools, several state charter schools serve Fort Collins, including Academy of Arts and Knowledge, Colorado Early Colleges, and Global Village Academy. Private schools include Heritage Christian Academy, Rivendell School, and St. Joseph's Catholic School.

=== Public libraries ===
The Poudre River Public Library District operates three branch locations in the city of Fort Collins: Old Town, Harmony, and Council Tree. The Library District was established in 2006 by voter approval, and aims to serve the more than 207,000 people in northern Larimer County, Colorado. The district is governed by a board of volunteer trustees, jointly appointed by the city of Fort Collins and Larimer County. The Council Tree location is set to close in the coming years

The library participates in cooperative projects with the local Poudre School District and Colorado State University.

==== Facilities ====
The Old Town Library (formerly, the Main Library) is a 43,000 square foot facility that has served the Fort Collins Community since 1976. It is located in the Fort Collins Old Town Historic District at 201 Peterson Street.

The Harmony Library is a 30,000 square foot joint-use facility located on the Front Range Community College campus, at 4616 South Shield Street in Fort Collins. Since its opening in 1998, the facility has served both the Community College (students, faculty, and staff) and the general public.

The Council Tree Library is a nearly 18,000 square foot facility that opened in 2009 in the Front Range Village (a retail commons) and is located at 2733 Council Tree Avenue in Fort Collins. The facility has a unique neighborhood atmosphere with an emphasis on families with young children.

The Webster House Administration Center opened in 2011 and houses the administration, collections, systems administration, maintenance, communications, and outreach staff. The center's opening freed up 3,000 square feet in the Old Town Library, space that is now used for library materials and services.

==== History ====
The library as an institution in Fort Collins dates back to the late 19th century, where reading rooms were established in churches or other rented locations. In 1882, for example, a reading room was established in the back of a Presbyterian Church on Whitton Block. The Fort Collins Public Library was officially established in 1900, the sixth public library in the state. The city received $12,500 from philanthropist Andrew Carnegie to build the library, with the condition that it would be maintained as a free public library. It was completed in 1904 at a total cost of approximately $15,000. When the Library opened, there were 2,770 books on hand. In 1937, the Library was awarded a grant from the Work Projects Administration for an annex to the building that would double its space, allowing for the construction of an auditorium/community room that opened in 1939.

As the Fort Collins community grew, so too did the need for more library space. In 1973, the City Council adopted a seven-year master plan which included a new library building. Voters approved a one percent tax increase to fund the plan. The new library building, named the Fort Collins Public Library (now, the Old Town Library), opened in 1976 and remains to this day in Library Park at 201 Peterson Street in Fort Collins.

In 2006, with ongoing city budget cuts impacting library services, residents voted to create and fund a library district with a 62% majority. This initiated a transition period in 2007 of separating the library from the city, for example, transferring finances, staff, and property to the Library District. The library was also given a temporary name, the Fort Collins Regional Library District. An intergovernmental agreement was finally signed in December 2007, that detailed each party's responsibilities during the transfer. In 2009, after asking for ideas from the public, the Poudre River Public Library District was approved as the library's permanent name.

=== Higher education ===
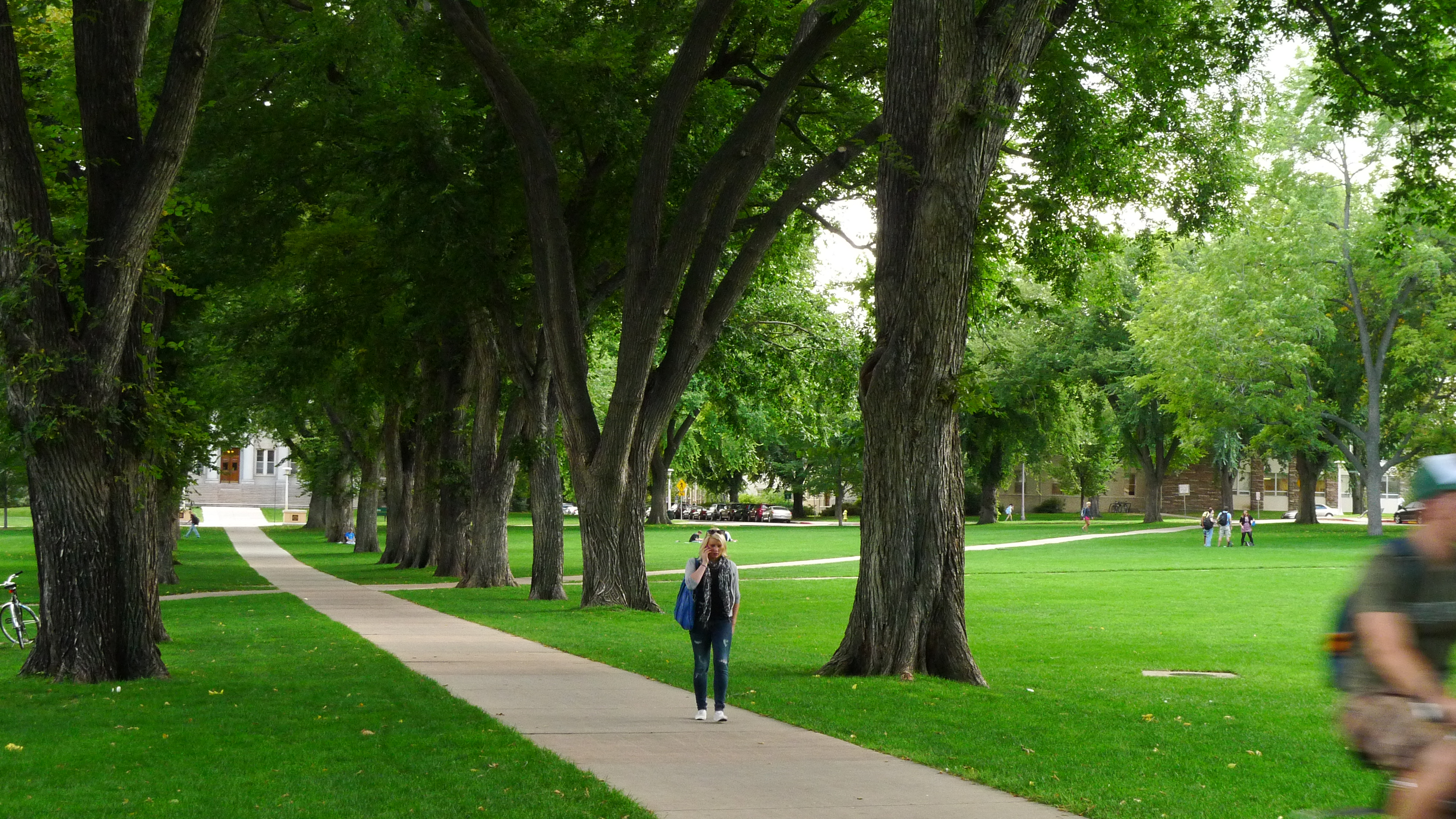
The Oval, part of the CSU campus

Colorado State University offers several degrees, including doctoral. Front Range Community College also maintains a campus in the city, and grants associate's degrees in arts, science, general studies, and applied science. The college offers 17 high school vocational programs and more than 90 continuing education classes.

The Institute of Business & Medical Careers provides professional training in the business and medical professions. The institute's first campus was established in the city in 1987.

Fort Collins has a range of research institutes. Facilities are maintained by the Centers for Disease Control and Prevention's Division of Vector-Borne Diseases, the Center for Advanced Technology and the Colorado Water Resource Research Institute. Other facilities include the Cooperative Institute for Research in the Atmosphere, the Institute for Scientific Computing, the U.S. Forest Service Experimental Station, the National Center for Genetic Resources Preservation (NCGRP), and the U.S.D.A. Crops Research Laboratory.

== Infrastructure ==
=== Transportation ===
==== Air travel ====
From nearby Northern Colorado Regional Airport, Avelo Airlines served both Burbank (BUR) and Las Vegas (LAS) from October 2021 until June 24, 2022, and June 16, 2022, respectively. Elite Airways resumed commercial air service at the airport on August 27, 2015, providing non-stop flights to the Chicago Rockford International Airport in Illinois. The airline ended service to the airport in 2017. Denver International Airport, which is 70 miles (110 km) to the south, is served by twenty-three airlines.

The city's former general aviation airport, known as Fort Collins Downtown Airport (3V5), opened in 1966 and closed in 2006.

==== Streets ====
Fort Collins' downtown streets form a grid with Interstate 25 running north and south on the east side of the city. Many of the streets are named after the town's founders. U.S. Highway 287 becomes College Avenue inside the city and is the busiest street; It runs north and south, effectively bisecting the city, and serving as the east–west meridian, while Mountain Avenue is the north–south. SH 14 runs concurrent with US 287 at the northern city limit to Jefferson Street, running southeast along Jefferson (later turning into Riverside Avenue), then turning east onto Mulberry Street where it goes east out of the city after an interchange with Interstate 25.

==== Transit and taxi ====
Fort Collins also once had a municipally owned trolley service with three branches from the intersection of Mountain and College avenues. The trolley was begun in 1907 by the Denver and Interurban Railroad, which had the intention of connecting the Front Range of Colorado. It was closed in 1951 after ceasing to be profitable. In 1983–84, a portion of the Mountain Avenue line and one of the original trolley cars, Car 21, were restored as a heritage trolley service, under the same name used by the original system, the Fort Collins Municipal Railway. This has been in operation since the end of 1984 on weekends and holidays in the spring and summer, as a tourist and cultural/educational attraction. A second car, number 25, was returned to service on July 4, 2020. A small fee applies to ride.

The city bus system, known as Transfort, operates more than a dozen routes throughout Fort Collins Monday through Saturday, except major holidays.

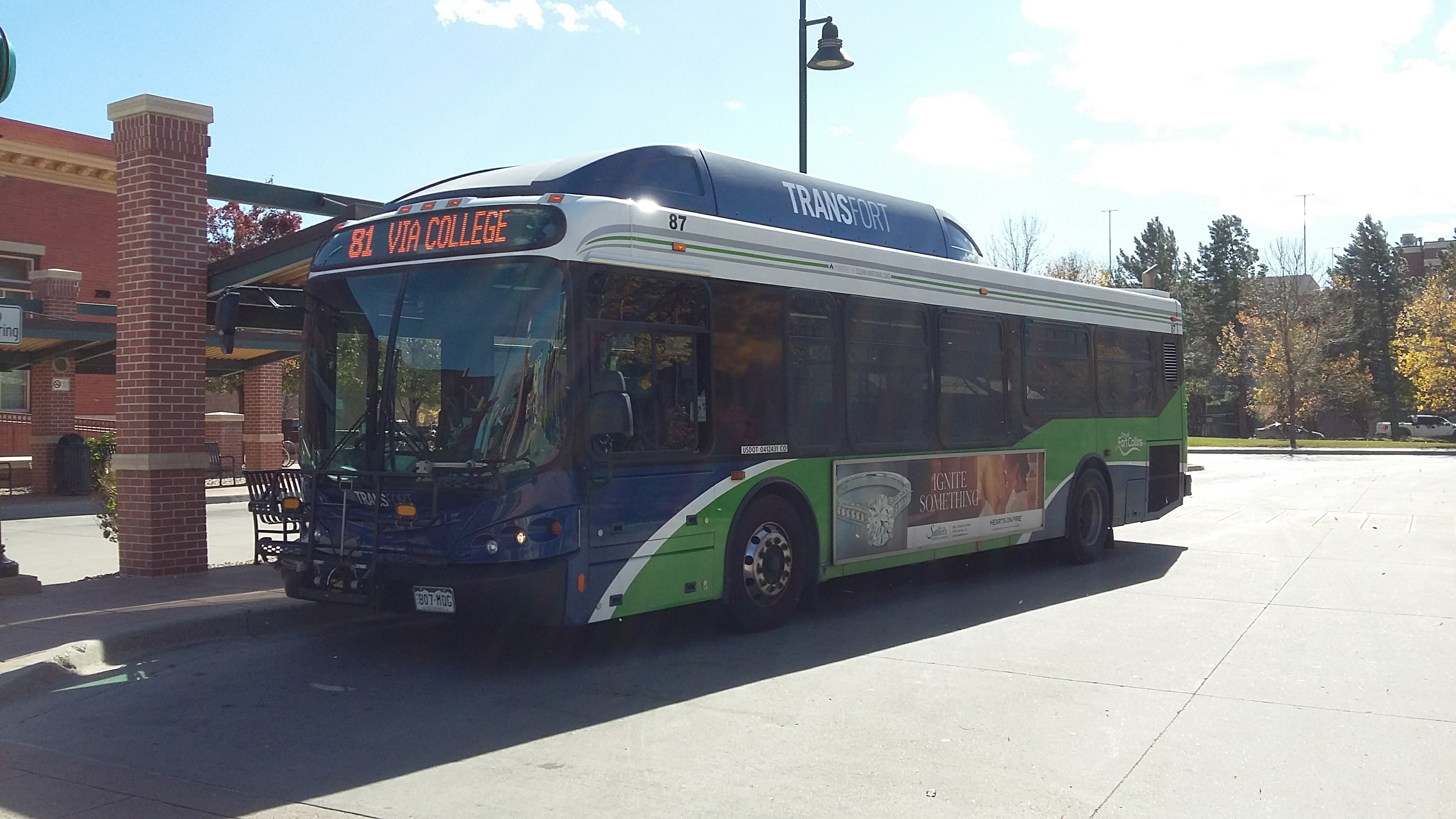
A Transfort bus

The MAX Bus Rapid Transit is a bus rapid transit that provides service on the Mason Corridor Transitway parallel to College Avenue from Downtown Fort Collins to a transit center just south of Harmony Road. The trip takes approximately 15 minutes from end to end with various stops between. The service began in May 2014. The Mason Corridor and the Mason Express are intended to be the center of future transit-oriented development.

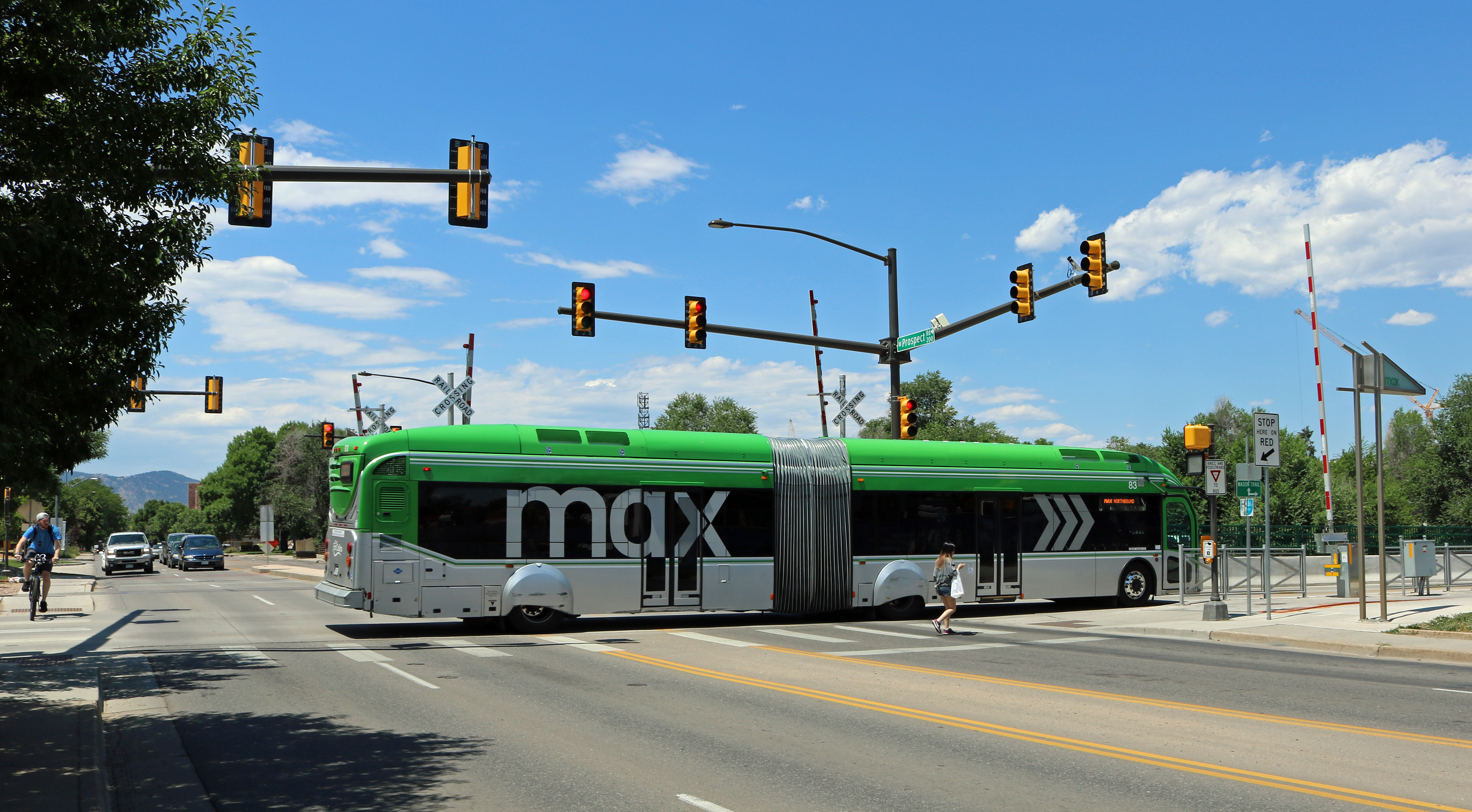
A Transfort MAX bus crossing West Prospect Road

Fort Collins is connected to Loveland, Berthoud, Longmont, and Boulder via the FLEX regional bus route. Greeley-Evans Transit operates a service called the Poudre Express connecting Fort Collins with Windsor and Greeley.

Bustang provides additional intercity transportation for the city. Fort Collins is the northernmost stop on the North Line, which connects southward to Denver. Planning for restoration of regional passenger rail recommenced in earnest in 2017. Fort Collins would be an intermediate stop for the proposed north–south Front Range Passenger Rail corridor between Pueblo and Cheyenne, Wyoming, though it would be the northern terminus of most trips.

==== Railroads ====
Freight service is provided by Union Pacific and BNSF.

Currently there is no intercity passenger service; the last remaining services connecting the Front Range cities ceased with the formation of Amtrak in 1971. Front Range Passenger Rail is a current proposal to link the cities from Pueblo in the south, north to Fort Collins and possibly to Cheyenne, Wyoming.

The Fort Collins Municipal Railway was a streetcar system from 1919 to 1951, and from 1984 has been partially reinstated as a seasonal Heritage Streetcar service, under the same name.

==== Cycling ====
Bicycling is a popular and viable means of transportation in Fort Collins. There are more than 280 miles (450 km) of designated bikeways in Fort Collins, including on-street designated bike lanes, and the Spring Creek and Poudre River Trails, both paved. There is also a dirt trail, the 5.8-mile (9.3 km) Foothills Trail, parallel to Horsetooth Reservoir from Dixon Reservoir north to Campeau Open Space and Michaud Lane.

The Fort Collins Bicycle Library lends bicycles to visitors, students, and residents looking to explore the city of Fort Collins. There are self-guided tours from the "Bike the Sites" collection, including a Brewery Tour, Environmental Learning Tour, and the Historic Tour. The Bike Library is centrally located in the heart of downtown Fort Collins in Old Town Square. The City of Fort Collins also encourages use of alternative transportation, like cycling and using public transit, through FC Moves.

In 2009, the Fort Collins-Loveland metropolitan statistical area (MSA) ranked as the third highest in the United States for percentage of commuters who biked to work (5.6 percent).

In 2013, the League of American Bicyclists designated Fort Collins a Platinum-level Bicycle Friendly Community – one of four in the United States. In 2018, the PeopleForBikes foundation named Fort Collins the no. 1 city in the United States for cycling.

==== Electric scooters ====
In early 2019, the City of Fort Collins and Colorado State University (CSU) were preparing regulations for the eventual arrival of electric scooters, in order to avoid the problems other cities have had with these. After a City Council session on Feb 19, the City Government approved scooter regulations, such as specific areas in which scooters must be parked and the observation of dismount zones. in October 2019, The City of Fort Collins and CSU announced a 12-month e-scooter share pilot program partnering with Bird company.

=== Facilities ===
- NIST time signal transmitters WWV and WWVB are near the city
- Poudre Valley Hospital has helped make Fort Collins into a regional health care center.
- The National Center for Genetic Resources Preservation (NCGRP) (Human Genome Project)
- The city is the headquarters of Roosevelt National Forest

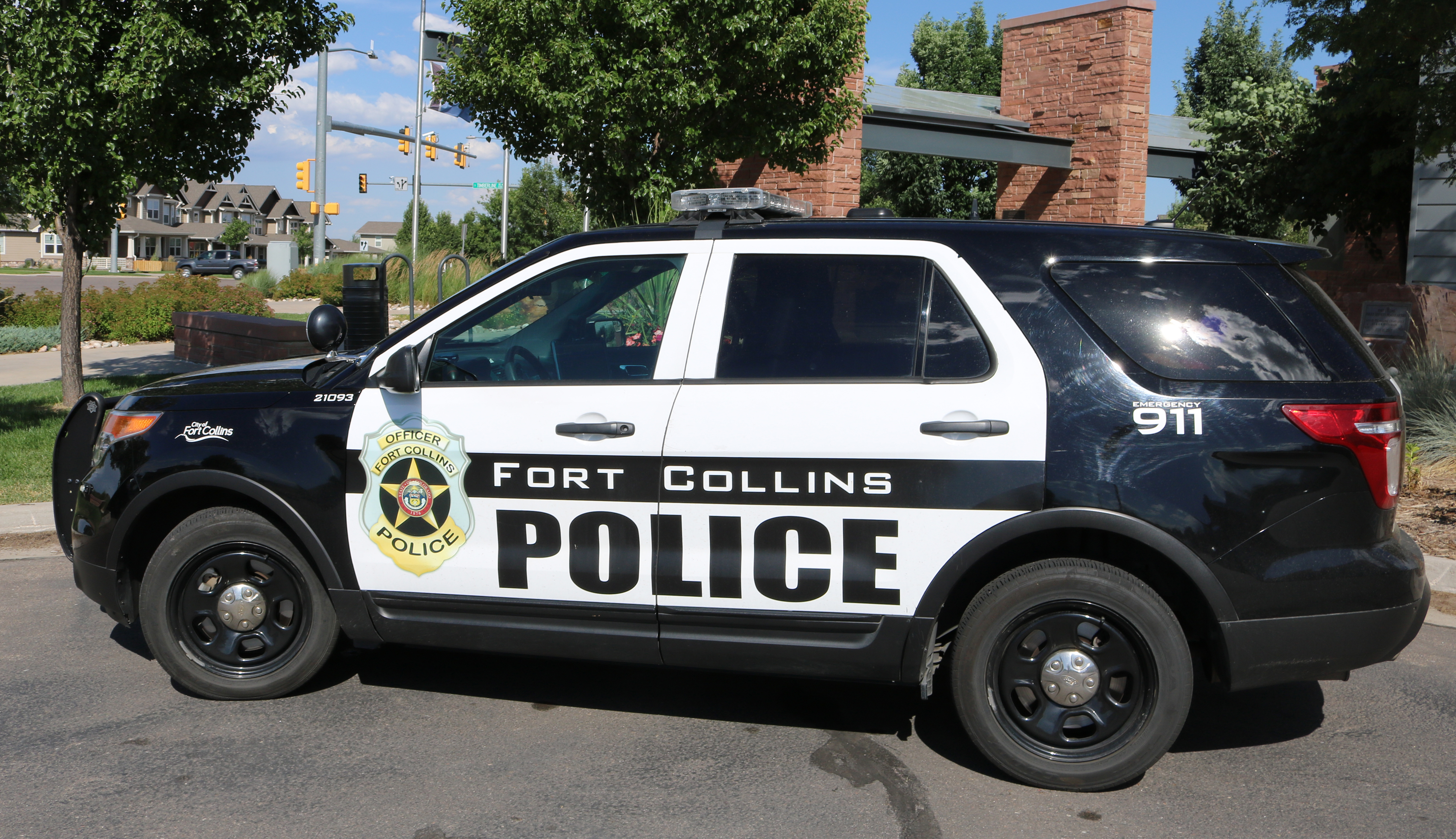
One version of a Fort Collins Police Services patrol car

- Atmospheric Chemistry and Aerosol Laboratory
- Centers for Disease Control and Prevention: Division of Vector-Borne Diseases
- USDA Seed Lab Storage
- Headquarters for SCUBA Schools International (SSI)
- National Wildlife Research Center
- USDA Animal and Plant Health Inspection Service Western Regional Headquarters
- Community Foundation of Northern Colorado

=== Police ===
The Fort Collins Police Services is headed by Chief Jeffrey Swoboda. As of 2018 it had 214 sworn individuals and 115 civilian personnel.

== Notable people ==
- Isaac Adamson, writer
- Wayne Allard, former U.S. senator from Colorado
- Scott Anderson, racing driver
- James B. Arthur, pioneer, entrepreneur, mayor, councilman, Colorado state senator
- John Ashton, actor
- Carol Berg, fantasy author
- Biota, music ensemble
- Mamie Birdwhistle, leader in local African-American community (1920–1943)
- Jason Blakely, political philosopher
- Frank Caeti, repertory cast member on sketch comedy series MADtv
- Allen Bert Christman, cartoonist and American Volunteer Group pilot killed in Rangoon, Burma, during World War II
- Colin Clark, soccer player who represented the United States national team
- Georgianna Coff, formerly enslaved domestic worker
- Jon Cooper, center for NFL's Minnesota Vikings
- Olivia Cummins, professional cyclist
- Joy Davidson, opera singer
- Janay DeLoach, professional track and field athlete and Olympian
- Rick Dennison, NFL linebacker
- Jeff Donaldson, NFL defensive back
- Becca Fitzpatrick, author
- Lamar Gant, powerlifter
- Harper Goff, artist, musician, and actor
- Marco Gonzales, Major League Baseball pitcher for the Seattle Mariners
- Temple Grandin, author, professor, subject of film Temple Grandin
- Chad Haga, professional cyclist
- JD Hammer (born 1994), Major League Baseball pitcher
- Jon Heder, actor, Napoleon Dynamite
- Ed Herman, mixed martial artist fighting for the UFC
- Katie Herzig, folk musician
- Immortal Dominion, heavy metal band known for soundtrack to Teeth
- Korey Jones, CFL player
- Darwood Kaye, actor who portrayed Waldo in the Our Gang short subjects series from 1937 to 1940
- Makenna Kelly, social media influencer, model, and actress
- Jake Lloyd, actor, young Anakin Skywalker in 1999's Star Wars: Episode I – The Phantom Menace
- Sonny Lubick, former head football coach at Colorado State University
- Gavin Mannion, professional cyclist
- Ross Marquand, actor best known for portraying Aaron in The Walking Dead
- David Mattingly, science fiction illustrator
- Hattie McDaniel, first African-American to win an Academy Award (Best Supporting Actress 1939)
- Darnell McDonald, former Major League Baseball player
- Donzell McDonald, former Major League Baseball player
- Bruce Sherman McEwen, neuroendocrinologist
- Mark D. Miller, photographer
- Edward S. Montgomery, journalist
- Pete Monty, NFL linebacker
- John Mortvedt, soil scientist and professor emeritus at Colorado State University
- Blake Neubert, artist
- Carl B. Olsen, U.S. Coast Guard rear admiral
- Reid Roberts, soccer player
- Bret Saberhagen, former Major League Baseball pitcher
- Holmes Rolston III, 2003 Templeton Prize winner
- Rachael Rudel, distance runner
- Steve Simske, engineer, inventor, scientist
- Derek Vincent Smith, electronic music artist who performs under name "Pretty Lights"
- Bill Stevenson, musician (Descendents), record producer, and owner of The Blasting Room Studios
- Travis Lane Stork, television personality, emergency physician, and author
- Pat Stryker, billionaire heiress
- Thomas Sutherland, Colorado State professor and former Beirut hostage
- Ryan Sutter, bachelor chosen as a groom by Trista Rehn in 2003's The Bachelorette
- Shane Swartz, boxer
- Derek Theler, actor in ABC family show Baby Daddy
- Haeley Vaughn, top 25 finalist of American Idol
- Byron Raymond White, Associate Justice of the Supreme Court
- Jason Wingate, composer
- Ben Woolf, actor
- Stelth Ulvang, musician, touring member of The Lumineers
- Audi Y Zentimiento, musician

== In popular culture ==
Along with Marceline, Missouri, Fort Collins is known as one of the towns that inspired the design of Main Street, U.S.A. inside the main entrance of many theme parks run by The Walt Disney Company around the world.

Fort Collins was the setting of the infamous balloon boy hoax of October 15, 2009.

== See also ==
- Fort Collins, CO Metropolitan Statistical Area
- Front Range Urban Corridor
- List of municipalities in Colorado
- List of populated places in Colorado
- List of post offices in Colorado
- Colorado State University
- Fort Collins Museum of Discovery
- The Gardens on Spring Creek
- Horsetooth Reservoir
- Roosevelt National Forest
