= Arthur's Rock =

Mountain near Fort Collins in Colorado

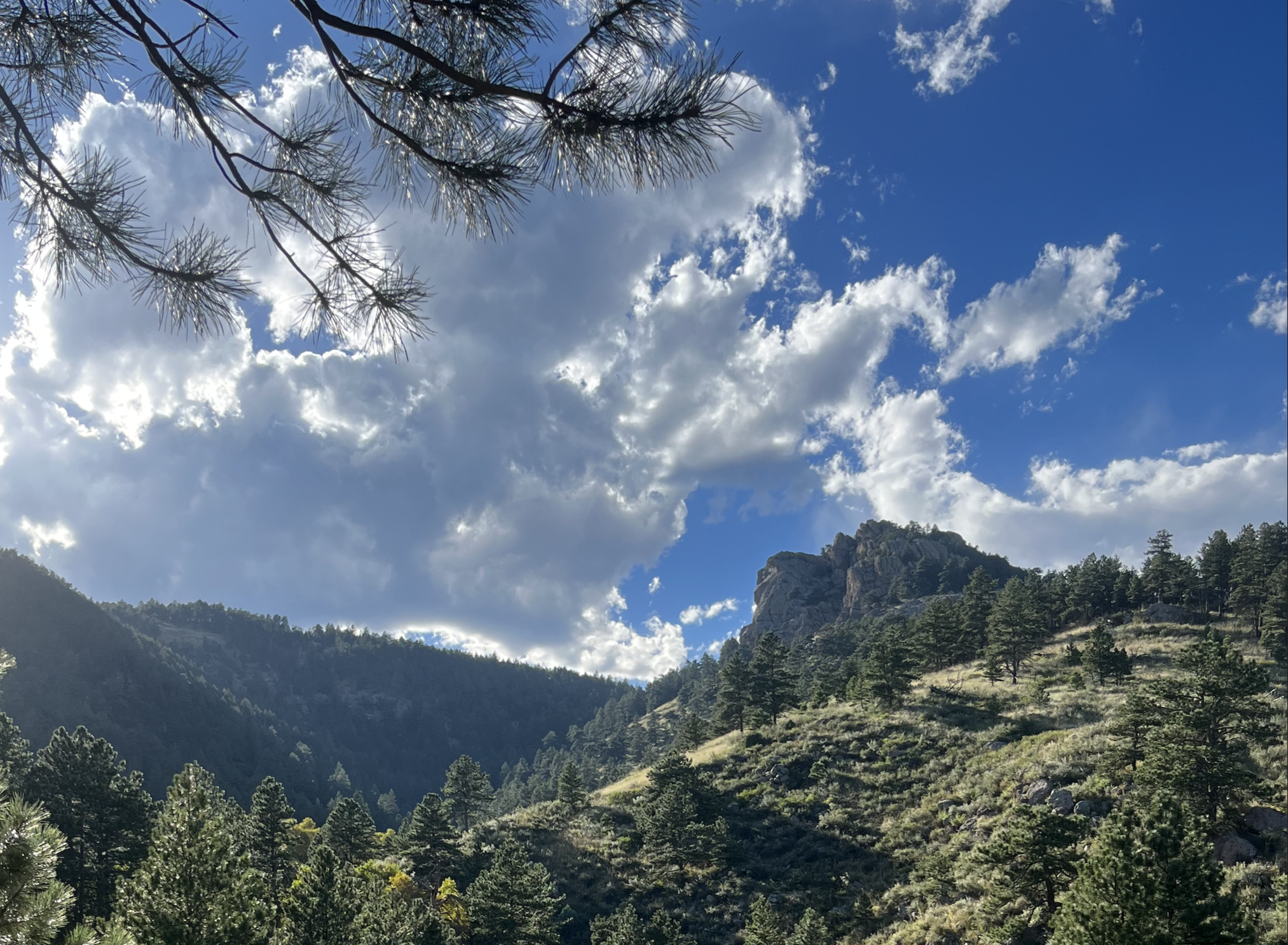
- Arthur's Rock rises steeply from the Great Plains in Lory State Park outside of Fort Collins, Colorado. The rock that composes it is over 1.7 billion years old (August 31st, 2023).

Highest point
- Elevation: 6,780 ft (2,070 m)
- Coordinates: 40.56828°N 105.18813°W

Geography
- Location within Colorado
- Location: Colorado, United States

Arthur's Rock is a 6,780 foot (2,066.5 meter) pillar in the foothills of the Colorado Front Range, near Fort Collins, Colorado.

== Etymology ==
The name "Arthur's Rock" comes from Arthur Howard, who owned the rock and its surroundings before the establishment of Lory State Park.

== Geography ==
Arthur's Rock is located directly outside of downtown Fort Collins, Colorado and is easily visible from much of the town and the campus of Colorado State University.

It is located within Lory State Park, a 2,574 acre wilderness park comprising the western side of Horsetooth Reservoir. A number of single track hiking and biking trails provide access to the summit and surroundings of Arthur's Rock. The trail to the top of the rock is among the most popular in the park.

The area receives a moderate amount of snowfall between the months of October and May.

== Geology ==
Similar to nearby Horsetooth Mountain, Arthur's Rock is composed of 1.7 billion year-old pegmatite, a type of intrusive igneous rock.

The rock that now forms the summit was originally a subterranean pluton, a part of the wider Log Cabin Batholith that covers much of the area currently. Over the millennia, layers of sedimentary rock have been eroded away, leaving the hard pegmatite exposed. This rock is exceptionally old.

== Ecology ==
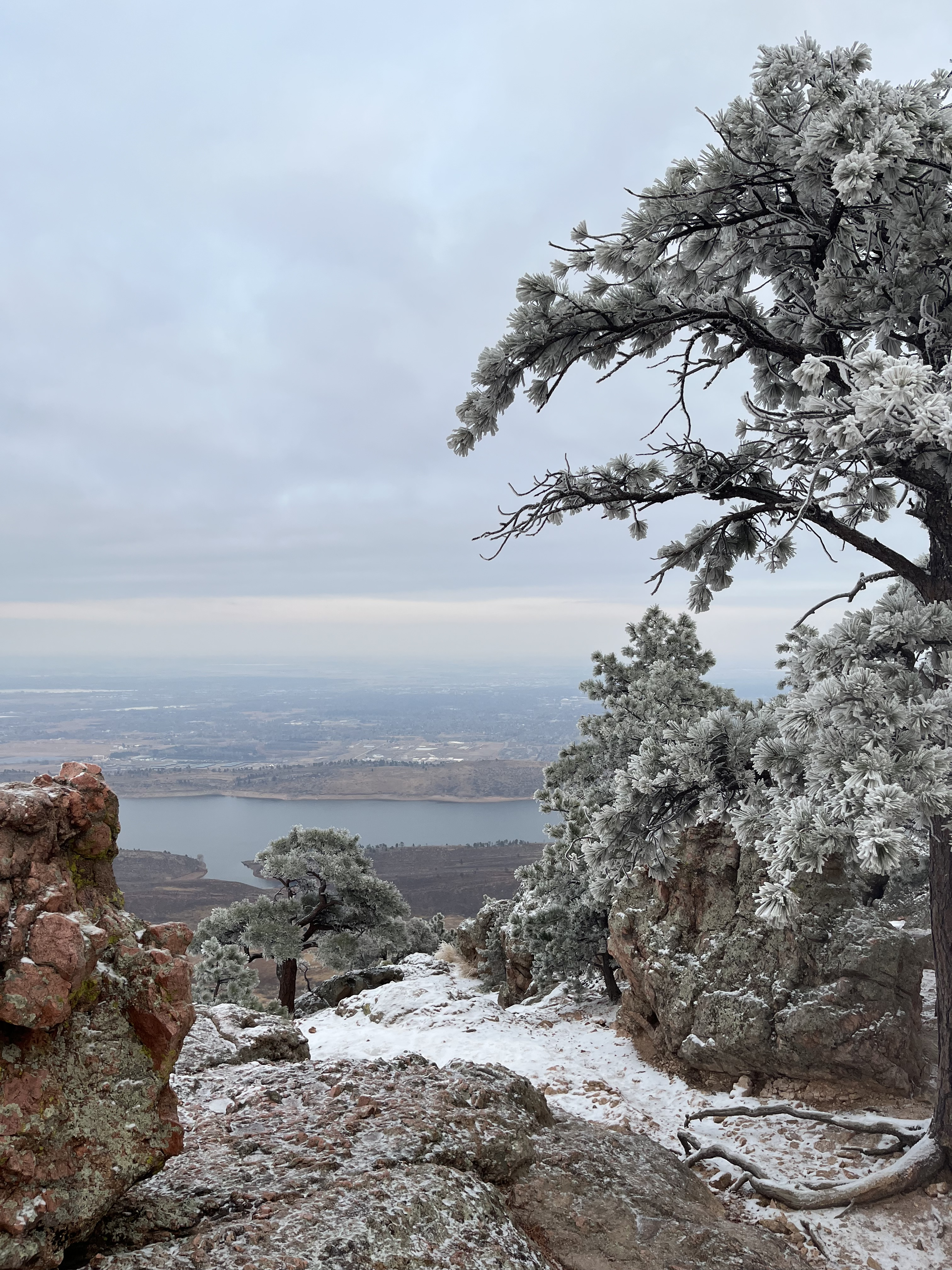
A winter view east from the summit of Arthur's Rock. Horsetooth Reservoir is visible in the center (December 13th, 2023).

Arthur's Rock exists at the intersection between the shortgrass prairie of the Great Plains and the Rocky Mountain ponderosa pine forest of the Front Range Foothills. Higher elevations on the mountain show species characteristic of montane ecosystems like blue spruce.

Lower elevations in the area of the mountain are host to prairies composed of Blue Grama (Bouteloua gracilis), Buffalo Grass (Bouteloua dactyloides) and Western Wheatgrass (Pascopyrum smithii). Rabbitbrush, sagebrush and prickly pear (Opuntia sp.) are common among grasses.

A number of wildflowers occur on and around Arthur's Rock like yarrow (Achillea millefolium), prairie sunflower (Helianthus petiolaris), common sunflower (Helianthus annuus), prairie bluebell (Mertensia lanceolata) and Rocky Mountain bee plant (Cleomella serrulata).

== See also ==
- Horsetooth Mountain
- Horsetooth Reservoir
- Lory State Park
- Redstone Creek
- Colorado State University
