= Mount McConnel =

Mountain in the state of Colorado

- Location within Colorado

Highest point
- Elevation: 8,012 ft (2,442 m)
- Prominence: 508 ft (155 m)
- Isolation: 1.83 mi (2.95 km)
- Coordinates: 40°40′20″N 105°27′52″W

Geography
- Location: Larimer County, Colorado, U.S.
- Parent range: Mummy Range
- Topo map(s): USGS 7.5' topographic map Big Narrows, Colorado

Climbing
- Easiest route: hike

Mount McConnel is a mountain summit in the Mummy Range of the Rocky Mountains of North America. The 8,012-foot (2,442 m) peak is located in the Cache La Poudre Wilderness of Roosevelt National Forest, 22.7 miles (36.5 km) west-northwest (bearing 292°) of the City of Fort Collins in Larimer County, Colorado, United States. The summit can be reached via the Mount McConnel National Recreation Trail.

== See also ==
- List of Colorado mountain ranges
- List of Colorado mountain summits
  - List of Colorado fourteeners
  - List of Colorado 4000 meter prominent summits
  - List of the most prominent summits of Colorado
- List of Colorado county high points
