= Blue Sky Marathon =

Series of races held in Colorado

- Date: September
- Location: Fort Collins, Colorado, United States
- Event type: Trail
- Distance: half-marathon, marathon, 50K
- Established: 2008
- Website: Race homepage

The Blue Sky Marathon is a series of trail races held outside of Fort Collins, Colorado. The current lineup of races includes a half-marathon, a marathon, and a 50K.

All races start in Horsetooth Mountain Open Space in Larimer County. The majority of the race is on singletrack trails, although individual sections range from gravel paths to technical rocky terrain. The marathon starts and finishes at the Blue Sky Trail trailhead. The course goes through the Horsetooth Mountain Park and Devil's Backbone Open Space. The cut off time for the marathon is 9 hours.

== Past winners ==
=== Marathon ===
- Male: Johannes Rudolph 3:23:46.3 2008
- Female: Lindsey Habermann 4:30:09.2 2008

=== Half marathon ===
- Male: Jonathan Vigh 1:31:30.2 2008
- Female: Susan Nuzum 1:43:19.3 2008
