= Greyrock Mountain =

Mountain in Colorado, United States

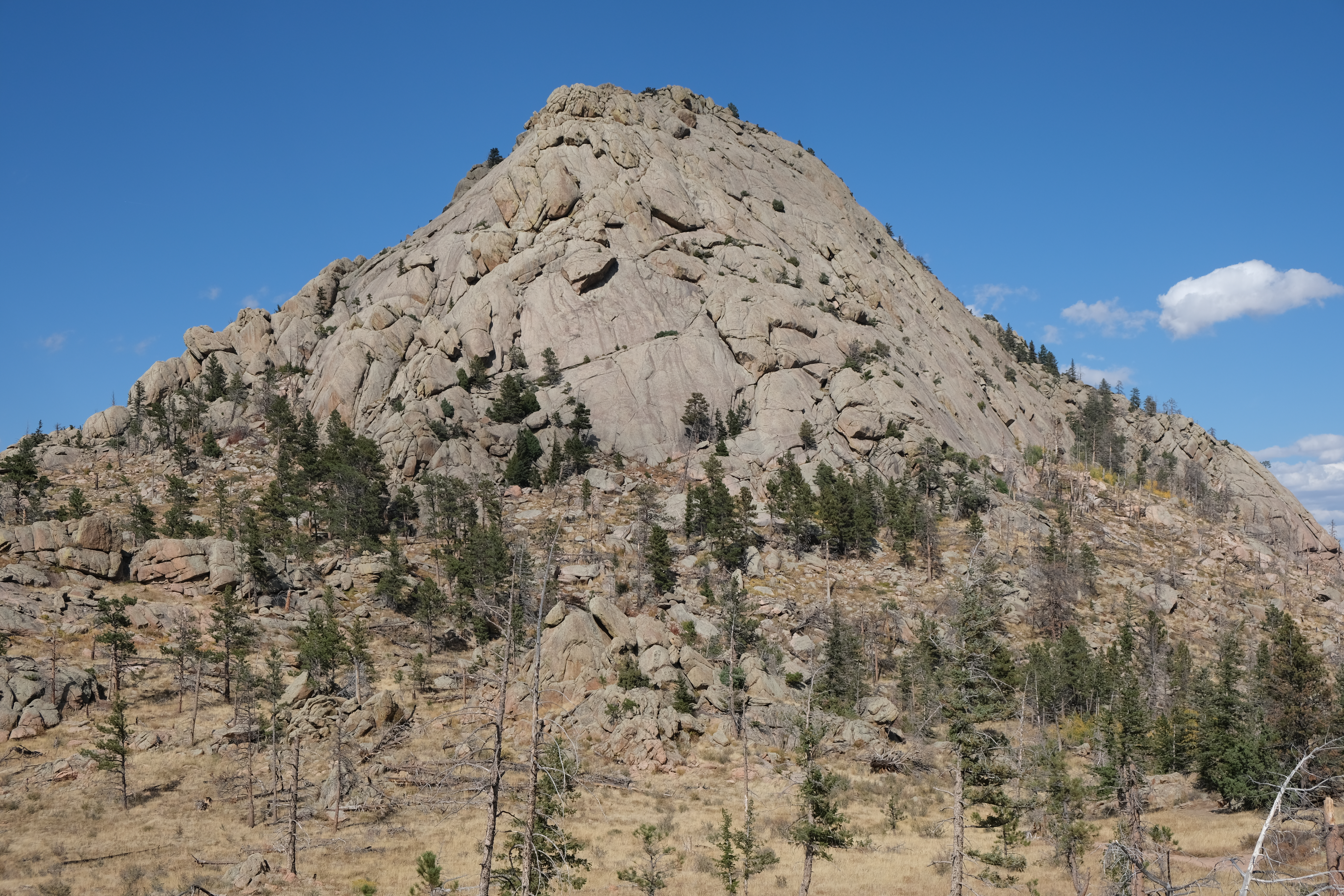
- Greyrock Mountain

Highest point
- Elevation: 7,616 ft (2,321 m)
- Prominence: 753 ft (230 m)
- Isolation: 0.92 mi (1.48 km)
- Coordinates: 40°42′56″N 105°17′33″W

Geography
- Location within Colorado
- Location: Larimer County, Colorado, U.S.
- Parent range: Laramie Mountains
- Topo map(s): USGS 7.5' topographic map Poudre Park, Colorado

Climbing
- Easiest route: hike, scramble

Greyrock Mountain is a mountain summit in the Laramie Mountains range of the Rocky Mountains of North America. The 7,616-foot (2,321 m) peak is located in Roosevelt National Forest, 1.2 miles (1.9 km) north-northeast (bearing 18°) of the community Poudre Park in Larimer County, Colorado, United States.

== Hiking ==
The summit of Greyrock Mountain can be reached via the popular Greyrock Mountain National Recreation Trail.

== See also ==
- List of Colorado mountain ranges
- List of Colorado mountain summits
  - List of Colorado fourteeners
  - List of Colorado 4000 meter prominent summits
  - List of the most prominent summits of Colorado
- List of Colorado county high points
