= Lory State Park =

State park in Colorado, United States

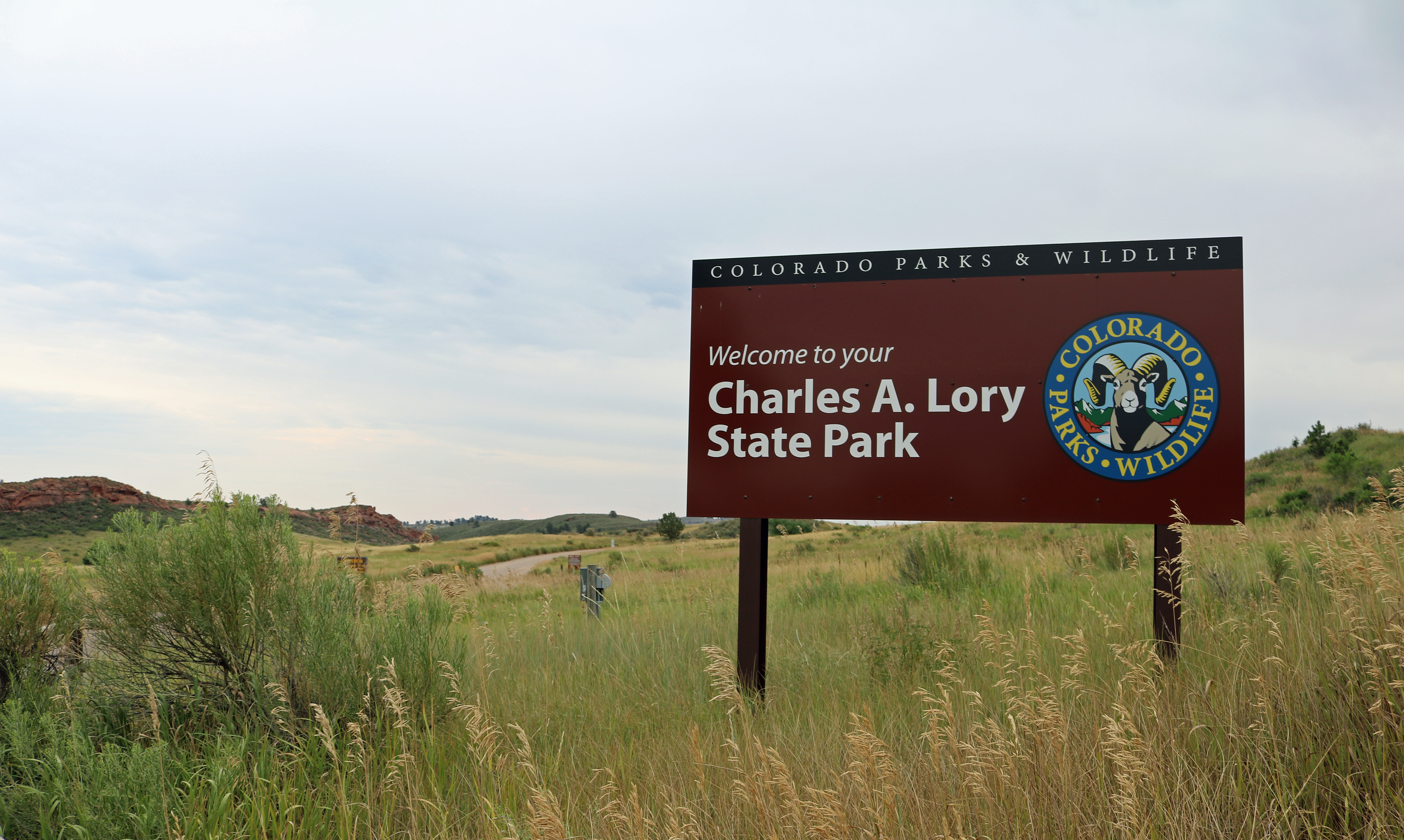
- The park's entrance.

- Location within Colorado
- Location: Larimer County, Colorado, U.S.
- Nearest city: Fort Collins
- Coordinates: 40°35′25″N 105°11′03″W
- Area: 2,492 acres (10.08 km^{2})
- Established: 1975
- Visitors: 265,807 (in 2021)
- Governing body: Colorado Parks and Wildlife

Lory State Park, is a state park located west of the city of Fort Collins, Colorado and is west of Horsetooth Reservoir and north of Horsetooth Mountain Park. Some of the park's more popular attractions include mountain biking, hiking, horseback riding and rock climbing. The park also contains its own bike park, which features dirt jumping, a pump track, and a skills area.

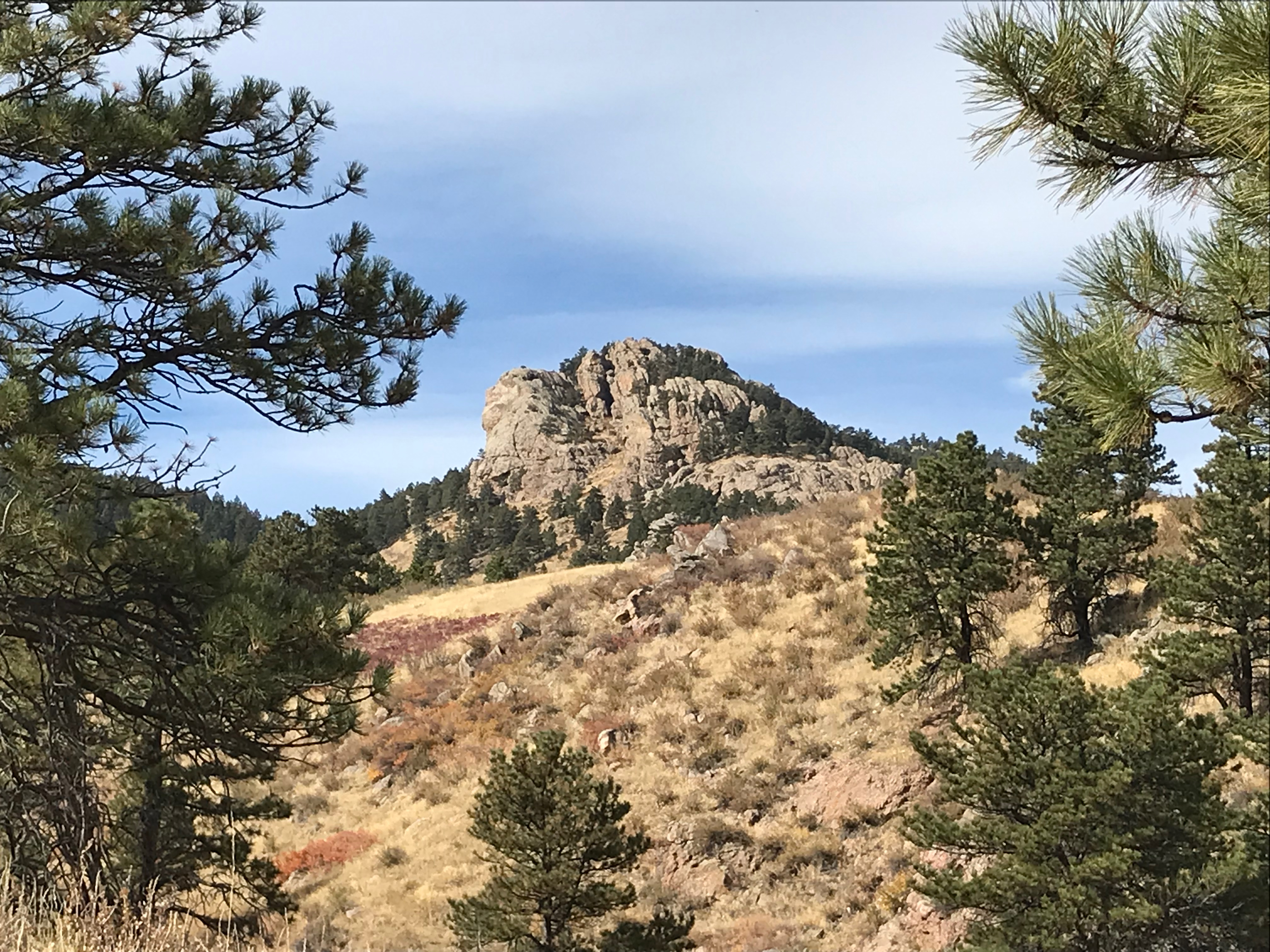
Arthur's Rock in Lory State Park. A popular hiking trail leads to the 6782' summit.

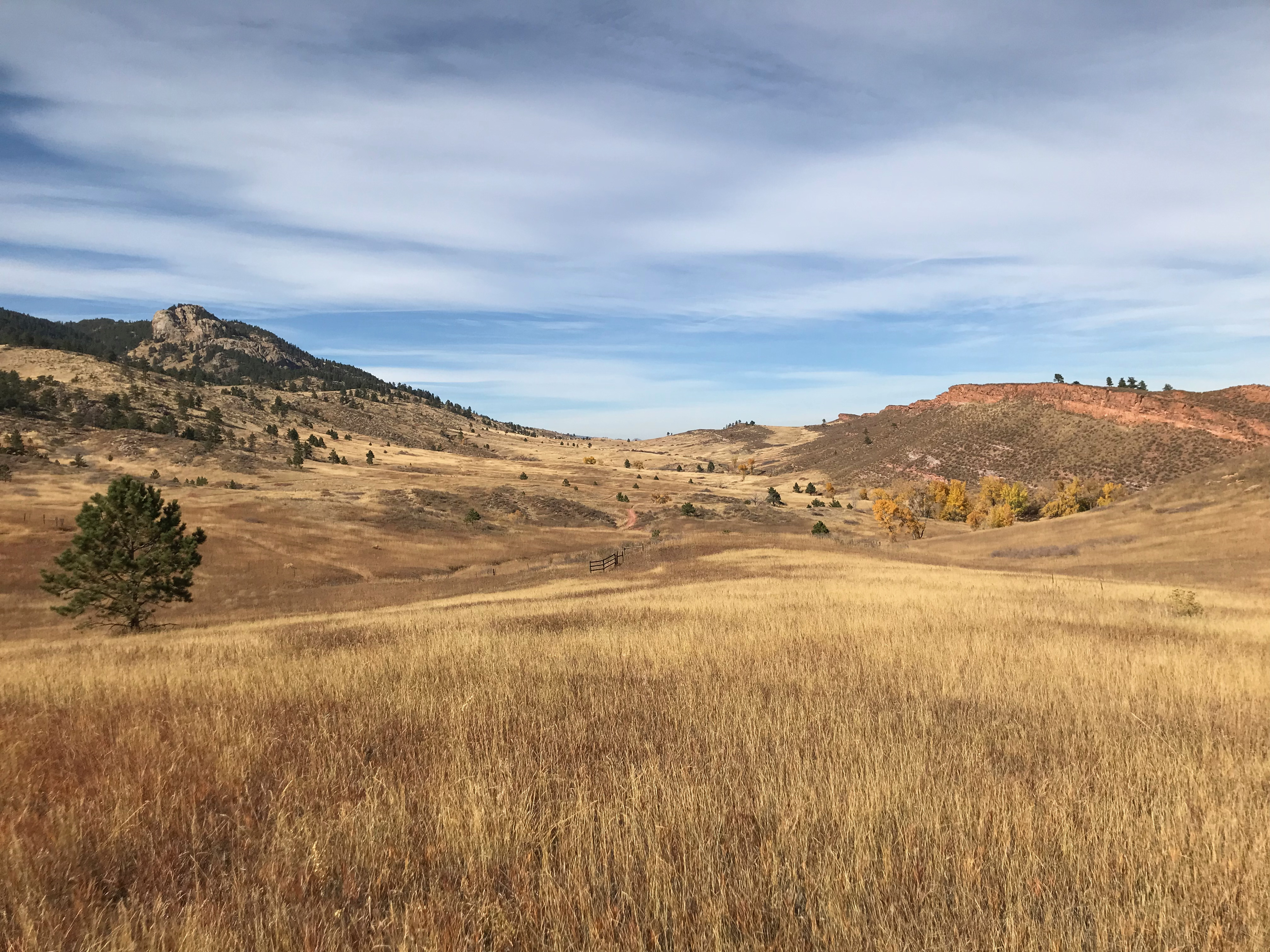
Arthur's Rock and the red sandstone escarpment of the Ingleside Ridge frame this view of the southeast corner of Lory State Park.

== See also ==
- Horsetooth Reservoir
- Horsetooth Mountain
