= Manhattan, Colorado =

Ghost town located north of Rustic in Larimer County, Colorado, United States

Coordinates: 40°43′56″N 105°36′00″W

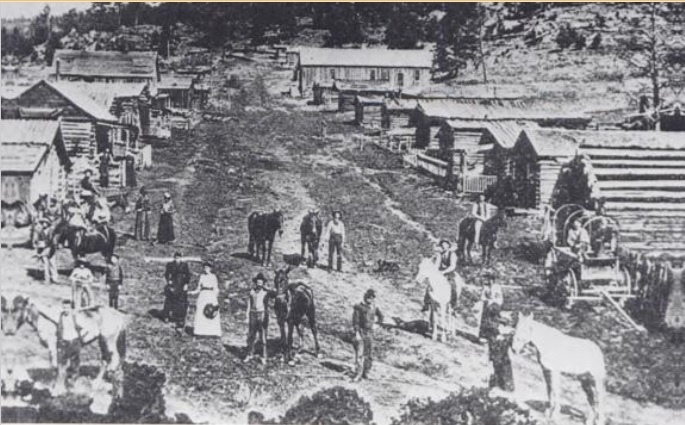
Manhattan gold mining town, 1888

Manhattan is a ghost town located 4 miles (6.4 km) north of Rustic in Larimer County, Colorado, United States at an elevation of 8,474 feet (2,583 m). It became a mining town after discovery of gold in the area in September 1886. The area was difficult to mine and produced small quantities of gold, and the population dropped off by the turn of the century. The land was acquired by the United States Forest Service and by 1933, the remaining structures were dismantled because they were considered a fire hazard, but a cemetery remains.

== History ==
The town was founded as a gold mining camp, after a "rich strike" was discovered west of Fort Collins in September 1886 between the Seven Mile and Elk Horn creeks. This resulted in a rush of miners to the area along Manhattan Creek. The town was platted in 1887 and a post office opened in March of that year. Today only a few boards remain of the town that had the Ace of Cubs saloon, a hotel, a butcher, livery stable, blacksmith, and houses. At first, people lived in tents and by the end of October 1887 there were 100 miners in town and 125 claims had been made. A school was opened the previous month that served Manhattan, Rustic, Elk Horn and Seven-Mile. There was little gold found and it was expensive to get to deposits deep in the earth. There were about 50 people in Manhattan in 1888. A discovery in the fall of 1890 led to a boom and building construction. Two people died in a mine explosion at the Black Hawk mine on November 13, 1892. There were about 300 people in Manhattan in 1898, but that had dropped to 50 in 1899. The post office closed at the end of 1900. In 1904, the school closed. A school was established in Elk Horn that in 1970 became part of the Fort Collins schools.

There were about 300 men who mined the Laugh-a-lot, Little Tipsy, and Katy's Pet mines, but the town never realized the boom predicted by The Denver Post in 1897. A radio soap opera, Our Gal Sunday, and the book A Lady from Colorado, later adapted into an opera by Robert Ward, were based upon the life of Irish immigrant, Katie Lawder, who was orphaned at the age of 12 and lived in Colorado beginning at age 18. In 1888, she married Cecil Ernest Moon, an Englishman and Oxford graduate who later attained a title and a fortune. Katie took her cowgirl clothing and western frontier ways with her on trips with her husband to England. Ultimately she fell out of favor with Cecil and his family and the couple was divorced. She then lived entirely in Colorado and wished to continue to be called Lady Cecil Moon. She bought a ranch by 1901 for US$2,500 (equivalent to $96,750 in 2025).

The town was then owned by the United States Forest Service and became a Civilian Conservation Corps (CCC) site in the 1930s. Some of the buildings from the town were moved, those that remained were burned by the Forest Service in the 1930s. The Manhattan Cemetery remains on Country Road 68C/162.

== Modern day ==
Nothing remains from the town except for a few small flat spots left from the foundations of cabins, normally hidden by grasses that grow on the townsite. The mining district is still active as indicated by 57 unpatented lode claims and 16 unpatented placer claims that are currently active as of December 31, 2021, in the area surrounding Manhattan, according to MyLandMatters.org which presents data published by the Bureau of Land Management. In late 2020, Manhattan and the surrounding mining district were burned by the Cameron Peak Fire.
