= Horsetooth Reservoir =

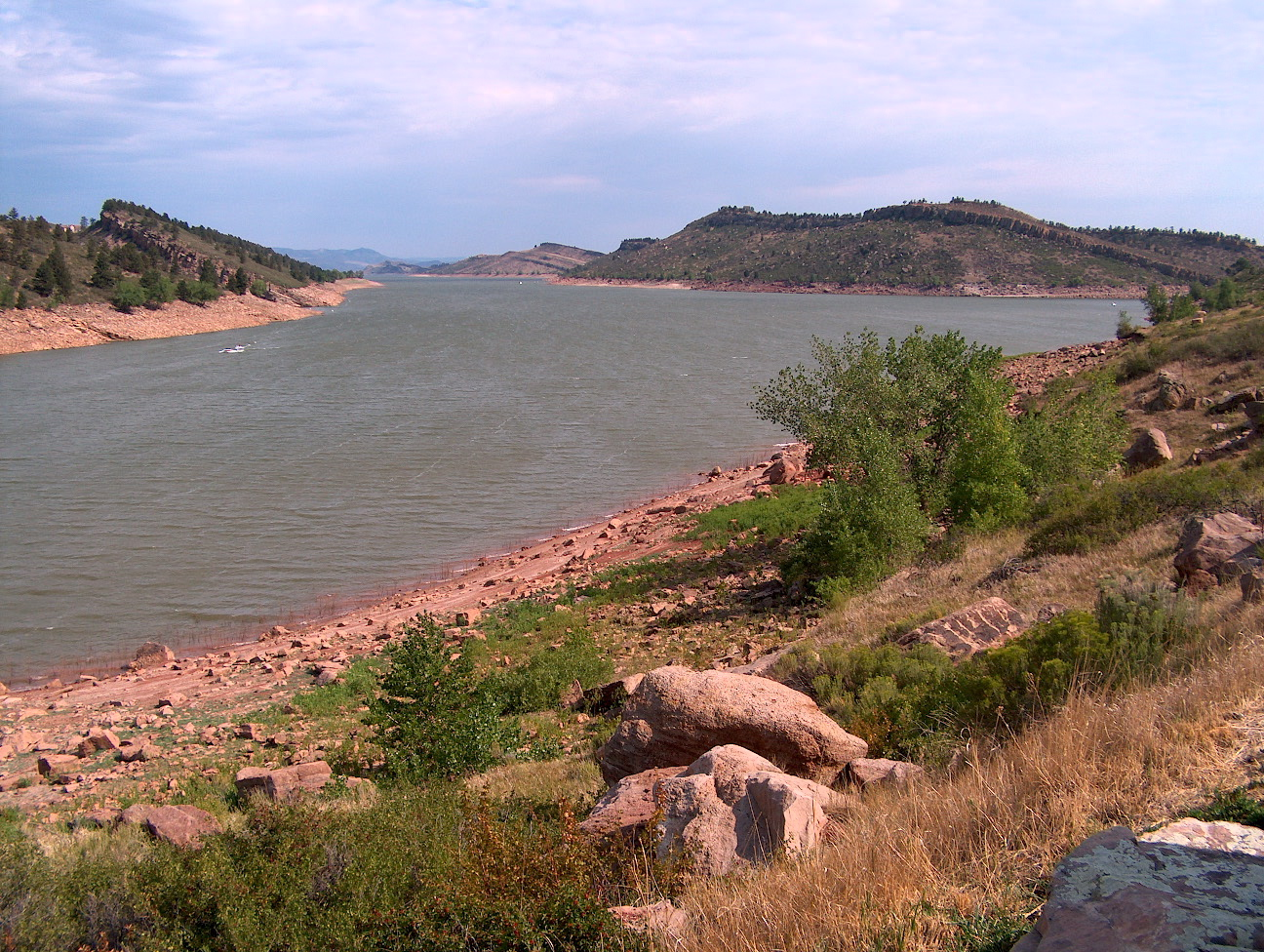

- Location within Colorado Location within the United States
- Location: Larimer County, Colorado
- Coordinates: 40°33′16″N 105°09′21″W
- Type: reservoir
- Basin countries: United States
- Max. depth: 200 ft (61 m)
- Water volume: 156,735 acre⋅ft (0.193330 km^{3})
- Surface elevation: 5,430 ft (1,660 m)

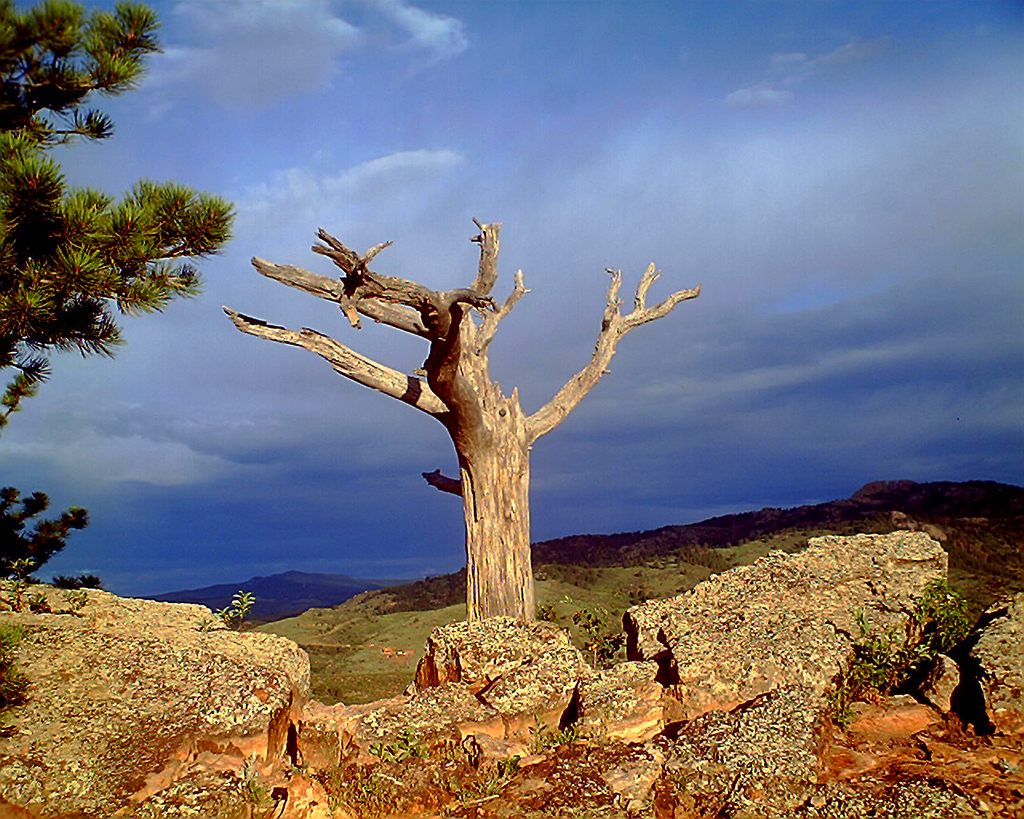
View near Horsetooth

Horsetooth Reservoir (often known locally as Horsetooth) is a large reservoir in southern Larimer County, Colorado, in the foothills just west of the city of Fort Collins, Colorado. The reservoir runs north-south for approximately 6.5 miles (10 km) and is approximately one-half mile (1 km) wide. Its shape and orientation are the result of the fact that the main body of the reservoir is contained between several homoclinal ridges. A ridge composed of Dakota sandstone runs along the east side where gaps in the ridge are plugged by dams. On the west (uphill) side there are two prominent ridges topped by erosion-resistant sandstones of the Lyons and Ingleside formations. Gaps in these ridges have created a handful of bays and coves the largest of which is Inlet Bay, home to a marina and campgrounds.

The reservoir was constructed in 1949 by the Bureau of Reclamation as part of its federal Colorado-Big Thompson Project or "C-BT". Water distribution is currently managed by Reclamation and operated by the Northern Colorado Water Conservancy District. Horsetooth and Carter Lake serve as the two principal reservoirs for water diverted eastward under the continental divide via the C-BT.

The reservoir is a supplementary source of municipal water for Fort Collins, Greeley and other communities in the region, as well as for irrigation in the lower South Platte River basin. The reservoir takes its name from Horsetooth Mountain, a summit in the foothills west of the southern end of the reservoir.

== History ==
The construction of the reservoir inundated some of the community of Stout. Prior to construction, the majority of the town moved to a location that today surrounds Horsetooth's South Bay, but a few building foundations, including that of the old school house, are now under water. The reservoir has a capacity of 156,735 acre-feet (193,330,000 m^{3}), a total shoreline of 25 miles (40 km). The reservoir is located roughly at 40°33′16″N 105°09′21″W. In recent history the reservoir has experienced relatively low water levels; however, in June 2014, it reached 98.6% of its capacity, the highest it had been in four years.

== Dams ==
Horsetooth Reservoir was created by the construction of four separate large earthen dams, all completed in 1949 and all modernized with a seismic retrofit in 2000-2004. The four dams, listed from north to south, are:

- Horsetooth Dam, which closes the northern end of the reservoir, with a height of 155 feet (47 m),
- Soldier Canyon Dam, 226 feet (69 m) high,
- Dixon Canyon Dam, 240 feet (73 m) high,
- Spring Canyon Dam, 220 feet (67 m) high.

Together the dams contain more than 10×10^{6} cubic yards (7.6×10^{6} m^{3}) of earthfill.

== Recreation and conservation ==
The reservoir is a popular recreation destination for the region. According to a recent study conducted by the Bureau of Reclamation and the recreation manager at Horsetooth, Larimer County Parks and Open Lands, approximately 570,000 visitors come to Horsetooth every year. Larimer County has provided recreation management at Horsetooth, which is surrounded by 1,900 acres of public lands, and three other C-BT reservoirs since they opened in the early 1950s.

Recreational boating is popular during summer months and swimming is allowed at the designated Swim Beach maintained by LCPOL as well as in some of the coves. Kayaking and canoeing is also popular. Fishing is also highly popular from boats or from shore, but is no longer allowed from the dams due to security concerns. Since the late 1960s, the sport of bouldering has become an established climbing pastime at the reservoir as the hard Dakota sandstone provides many challenging problems for both American and foreign athletes. However cliff diving is prohibited in all areas of the reservoir due to safety concerns. Park rangers patrol the reservoir for violators to keep everyone enjoying the reservoirs safely. Road cycling around Horsetooth has also become popular as has hiking and mountain biking, particularly along the Foothills Trail that traverses the reservoir's eastern edge. The City of Fort Collins maintains several open spaces directly below the reservoir and the state-owned Lory State Park is along the reservoir's northwestern shore.

Other ridge lines surrounding the reservoir have become the site of residential development in recent decades, with structures ranging from get-away-cabins to luxury homes.

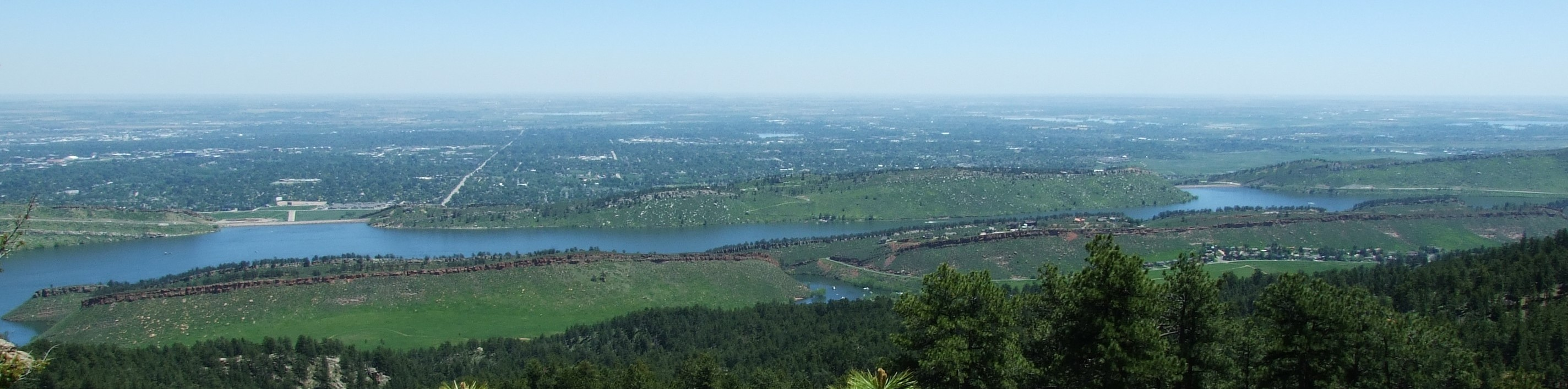
View to the east across midsection of Horsetooth Reservoir towards Fort Collins. Sandstone escarpments of the ridges that border the reservoir are visible. Also shown are the (l to r) Dixon Canyon and Spring Canyon dams, as well as glimpses of Quarry and Dixon Coves in the foreground.

== Gallery ==
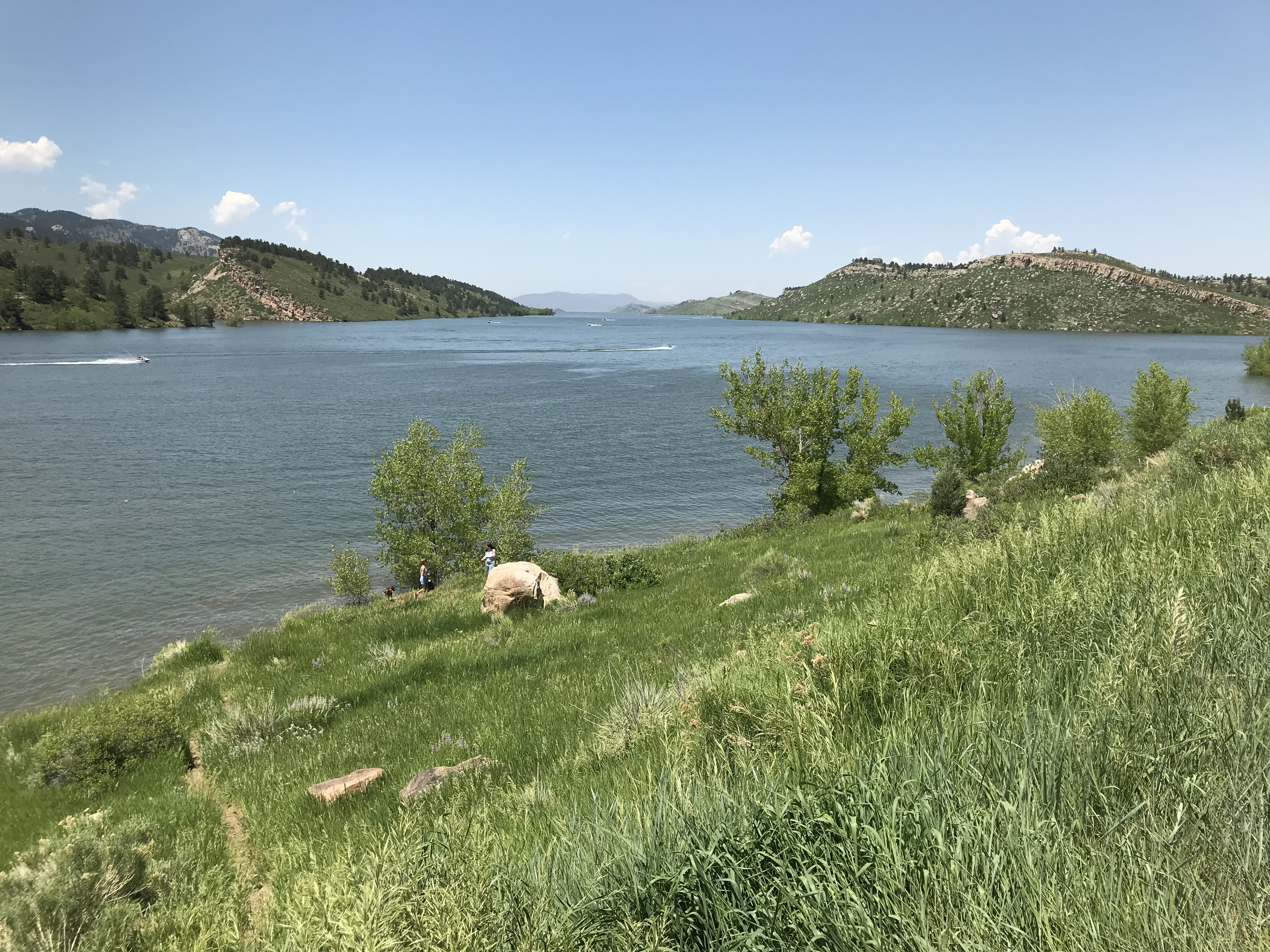
Horsetooth Reservoir at 98.8% full in June 2021.

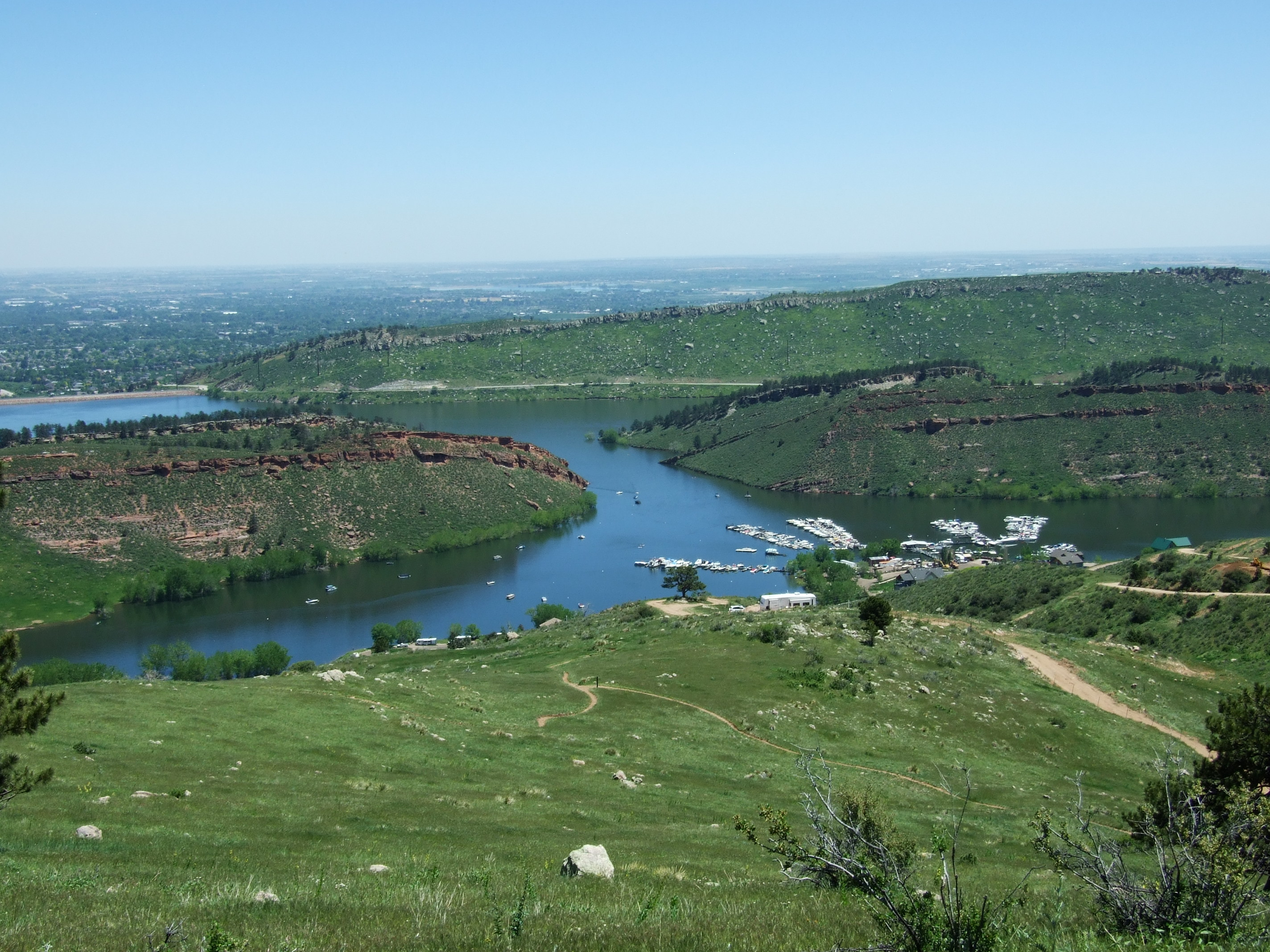
Inlet Bay at Horsetooth Reservoir

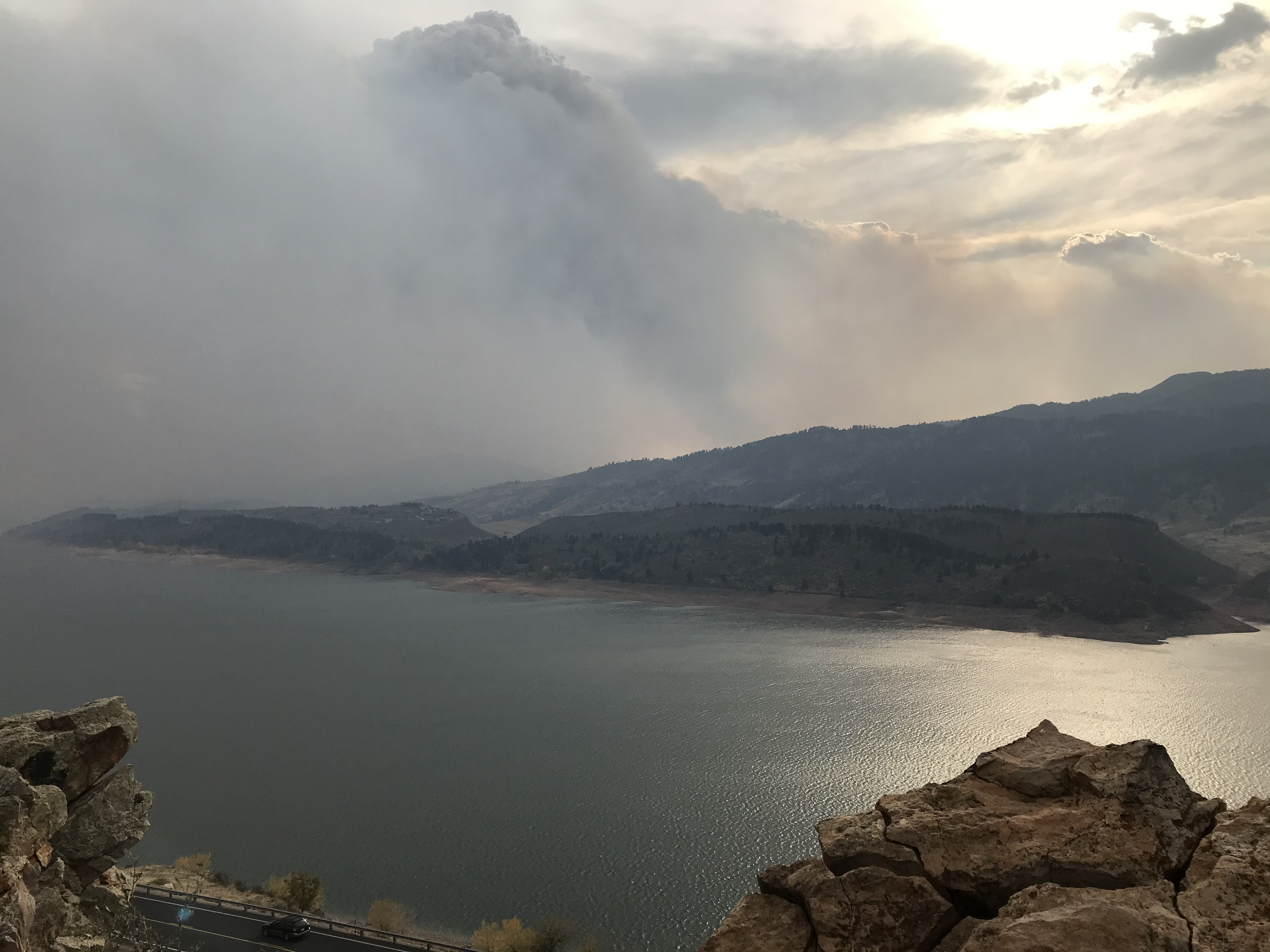
The reservoir shrouded in smoke from the approaching Cameron Peak wildfire in October 2020.

== See also ==
- Fort Collins
- Horsetooth Mountain
- Larimer County
- List of largest reservoirs of Colorado
- Lory State Park
