= Old Roach, Colorado =

Ghost town in Colorado, U.S.

Coordinates: 40°55′28″N 106°07′02″W

Old Roach is a ghost town in northwestern Larimer County, Colorado, United States. Once a company logging town, occupied roughly between 1923 and 1938, it lies in northern Colorado near the Wyoming border.

Old Roach was built by the Otto Lumber Company for the purpose of railroad logging, or tie hacking. Railroad ties were needed to build and maintain the growing railroad network in the American west, and tie hacks were the loggers who cut the timber and shaped it into railroad ties. Old Roach was an extensive company town which had homes as well as a post office, a store, and a school. It was inhabited from the early 1920s to the 1930s when it was dismantled from the National Forest lands where it was located. All that remains today in this ghost town are a few foundations, and the remains of a wooden flume and splash dam located along nearby Stuck Creek. The splash dam and flume were used to regulate water flows needed to float the new railroad ties down to the Big Laramie River during the annual spring tie drive. The ties were collected in Laramie, Wyoming where the Union Pacific Railroad was located.

Old Roach is located within the Roosevelt National Forest. Archaeological explorations of Old Roach were conducted by the U.S. Forest Service through the Passport in Time (PIT) program. The town site was examined and surveyed by Forest Service archaeologists and PIT volunteers in the summer of 2006. The splash dam and Stuck Creek flume were also surveyed and artifacts noted. In 2007, archaeologists expanded the survey to include the search for the remains of Forrester Camp, a satellite logging camp operated by the Otto Lumber Company. This camp was found located about five miles southeast of Old Roach. The 2008 field survey resulted in the discovery of another satellite logging camp known as "Camp 3", located approximately three miles west of Old Roach. Another satellite camp known as East Beaver Creek was located and recorded during the 2009 field survey. East Beaver Camp is about five miles northwest of Old Roach. Several other satellite camps of the Otto Lumber company remain in the forest and hope to be located and recorded in future years.

The history of tie hacking in northern Colorado and southern Wyoming is described in Logging the Rockies: The Langendorf-Olson Story by Patricia Langendorf, Spruce Gulch Press (1992), ISBN 0-9625714-9-0.

== Climate ==
Roach is a SNOTEL weather station located near Old Roach at an elevation of 9,700 feet or 2,957 meters. Roach has a subalpine climate (Köppen Dfc), bordering on an alpine climate (ETH), with only two months averaging over 50 °F or 10 °C.

Climate data for Roach, Colorado (elevation 9,700 feet or 2,957 meters), 1991–2020 normals:
Month	Jan	Feb	Mar	Apr	May	Jun	Jul	Aug	Sep	Oct	Nov	Dec	Year
Mean daily maximum °F (°C)	27.4 (−2.6)	29.6 (−1.3)	37.7 (3.2)	44.0 (6.7)	53.2 (11.8)	64.0 (17.8)	70.9 (21.6)	68.5 (20.3)	60.5 (15.8)	47.3 (8.5)	34.9 (1.6)	26.5 (−3.1)	47.0 (8.4)
Daily mean °F (°C)	18.8 (−7.3)	19.9 (−6.7)	26.6 (−3.0)	32.2 (0.1)	40.6 (4.8)	49.2 (9.6)	55.9 (13.3)	54.1 (12.3)	47.1 (8.4)	36.6 (2.6)	26.3 (−3.2)	18.3 (−7.6)	35.5 (1.9)
Mean daily minimum °F (°C)	10.1 (−12.2)	10.0 (−12.2)	15.3 (−9.3)	20.4 (−6.4)	27.9 (−2.3)	34.4 (1.3)	40.9 (4.9)	39.7 (4.3)	33.5 (0.8)	25.8 (−3.4)	17.6 (−8.0)	10.1 (−12.2)	23.8 (−4.6)
Average precipitation inches (mm)	3.07 (78)	2.98 (76)	3.22 (82)	4.24 (108)	3.44 (87)	2.06 (52)	1.64 (42)	1.41 (36)	2.11 (54)	2.57 (65)	2.86 (73)	3.14 (80)	32.74 (833)
Source 1: XMACIS2
Source 2: NOAA (Precipitation)

There is another weather station at Hohnholz Ranch, roughly 6.8 miles or 10.9 kilometers east of Old Roach. Hohnholz Ranch has a subalpine climate (Köppen Dfc), bordering on a humid continental climate (Dfb).

Climate data for Hohnholz Ranch, Colorado (elevation 7,797 feet or 2,377 meters), 1991–2020 normals, 1985-2020 extremes:
Month	Jan	Feb	Mar	Apr	May	Jun	Jul	Aug	Sep	Oct	Nov	Dec	Year
Record high °F (°C)	60 (16)	58 (14)	70 (21)	76 (24)	84 (29)	93 (34)	92 (33)	90 (32)	87 (31)	77 (25)	68 (20)	59 (15)	93 (34)
Mean maximum °F (°C)	50.3 (10.2)	51.2 (10.7)	60.1 (15.6)	69.3 (20.7)	77.3 (25.2)	84.0 (28.9)	88.4 (31.3)	85.9 (29.9)	82.0 (27.8)	73.3 (22.9)	60.8 (16.0)	51.1 (10.6)	88.8 (31.6)
Mean daily maximum °F (°C)	34.6 (1.4)	36.4 (2.4)	44.2 (6.8)	51.7 (10.9)	61.7 (16.5)	73.5 (23.1)	80.2 (26.8)	78.0 (25.6)	70.6 (21.4)	57.3 (14.1)	43.7 (6.5)	34.2 (1.2)	55.5 (13.1)
Daily mean °F (°C)	20.9 (−6.2)	22.0 (−5.6)	30.2 (−1.0)	36.3 (2.4)	45.3 (7.4)	54.8 (12.7)	61.0 (16.1)	58.5 (14.7)	50.8 (10.4)	40.0 (4.4)	29.3 (−1.5)	20.5 (−6.4)	39.1 (4.0)
Mean daily minimum °F (°C)	7.3 (−13.7)	7.7 (−13.5)	16.1 (−8.8)	21.0 (−6.1)	28.8 (−1.8)	36.2 (2.3)	41.8 (5.4)	39.1 (3.9)	31.0 (−0.6)	22.7 (−5.2)	14.8 (−9.6)	6.8 (−14.0)	22.8 (−5.1)
Mean minimum °F (°C)	−21.4 (−29.7)	−19.6 (−28.7)	−8.1 (−22.3)	4.9 (−15.1)	13.6 (−10.2)	26.8 (−2.9)	33.1 (0.6)	30.6 (−0.8)	19.6 (−6.9)	5.2 (−14.9)	−7.5 (−21.9)	−21.1 (−29.5)	−28.8 (−33.8)
Record low °F (°C)	−48 (−44)	−42 (−41)	−31 (−35)	−13 (−25)	−8 (−22)	19 (−7)	26 (−3)	22 (−6)	10 (−12)	−14 (−26)	−29 (−34)	−41 (−41)	−48 (−44)
Average precipitation inches (mm)	0.64 (16)	0.74 (19)	1.05 (27)	1.61 (41)	1.74 (44)	1.56 (40)	1.40 (36)	1.41 (36)	1.36 (35)	1.12 (28)	0.90 (23)	0.74 (19)	14.27 (364)
Average snowfall inches (cm)	10.40 (26.4)	11.20 (28.4)	15.00 (38.1)	16.80 (42.7)	7.90 (20.1)	0.80 (2.0)	0.00 (0.00)	0.00 (0.00)	1.70 (4.3)	10.00 (25.4)	12.50 (31.8)	11.30 (28.7)	97.6 (247.9)
Average precipitation days (≥ 0.01 in)	7.7	8.7	8.6	11.0	10.2	8.5	10.0	10.7	8.5	6.8	8.2	8.3	107.2
Average snowy days (≥ 0.1 in)	8.0	8.7	8.2	9.6	2.8	0.4	0.0	0.0	0.8	3.3	7.2	8.6	57.6
Source 1: NOAA
Source 2: XMACIS (records & monthly max/mins)
