= Greyrock Mountain National Recreation Trail =

Hiking trail in Colorado, United States

Coordinates: 40°41′43″N 105°17′7″W

Greyrock Mountain Trail
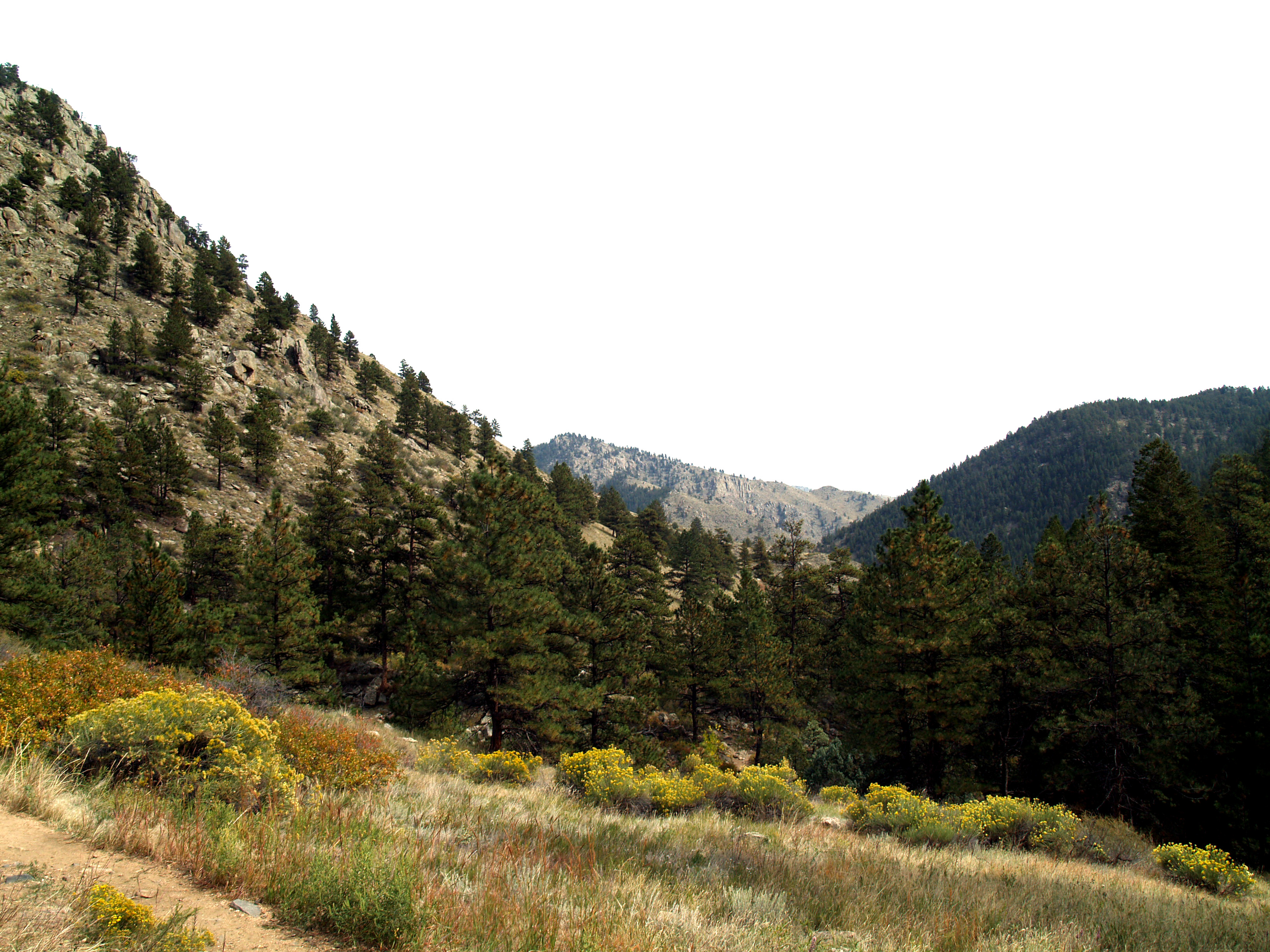
- Greyrock Mountain Trail
- Length: 3.1 miles (5.0 km)
- Location: Roosevelt National Forest, Colorado, United States
- Designation: National Recreation Trail
- Use: Hiking
- Elevation change: 2,039 feet (621 m)
- Highest point: Greyrock Mountain summit 7,613 feet (2,320 m)
- Lowest point: Trailhead on Cache La Poudre river 5,574 feet (1,699 m)
- Difficulty: Moderate

Greyrock Mountain National Recreation Trail is a hiking trail in Roosevelt National Forest west of Laporte, Colorado. The trail was constructed by the Civilian Conservation Corps in the 1930s and designated as a National Recreation Trail in 1979.

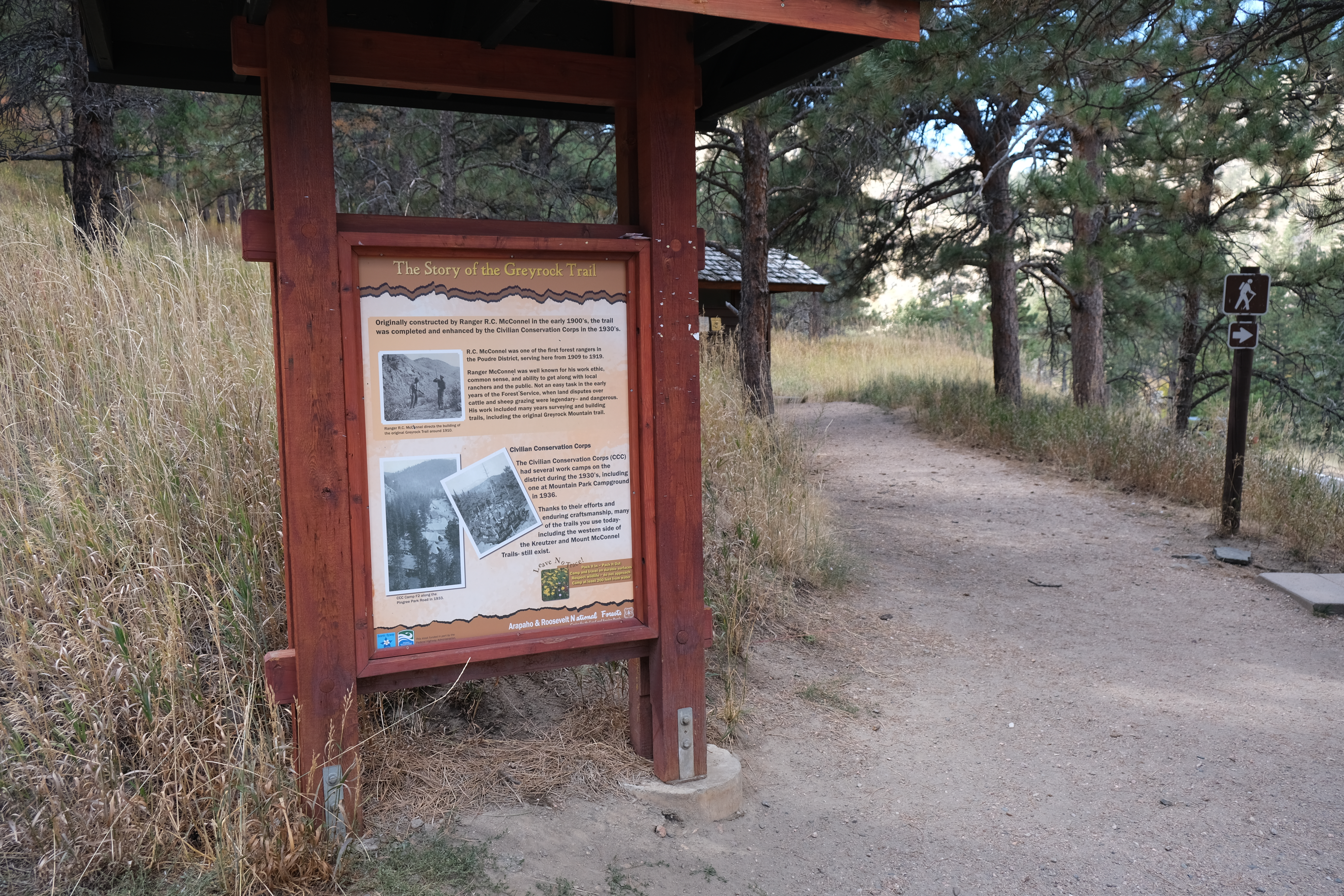
Sign at the trailhead informs hikers of the trail's history

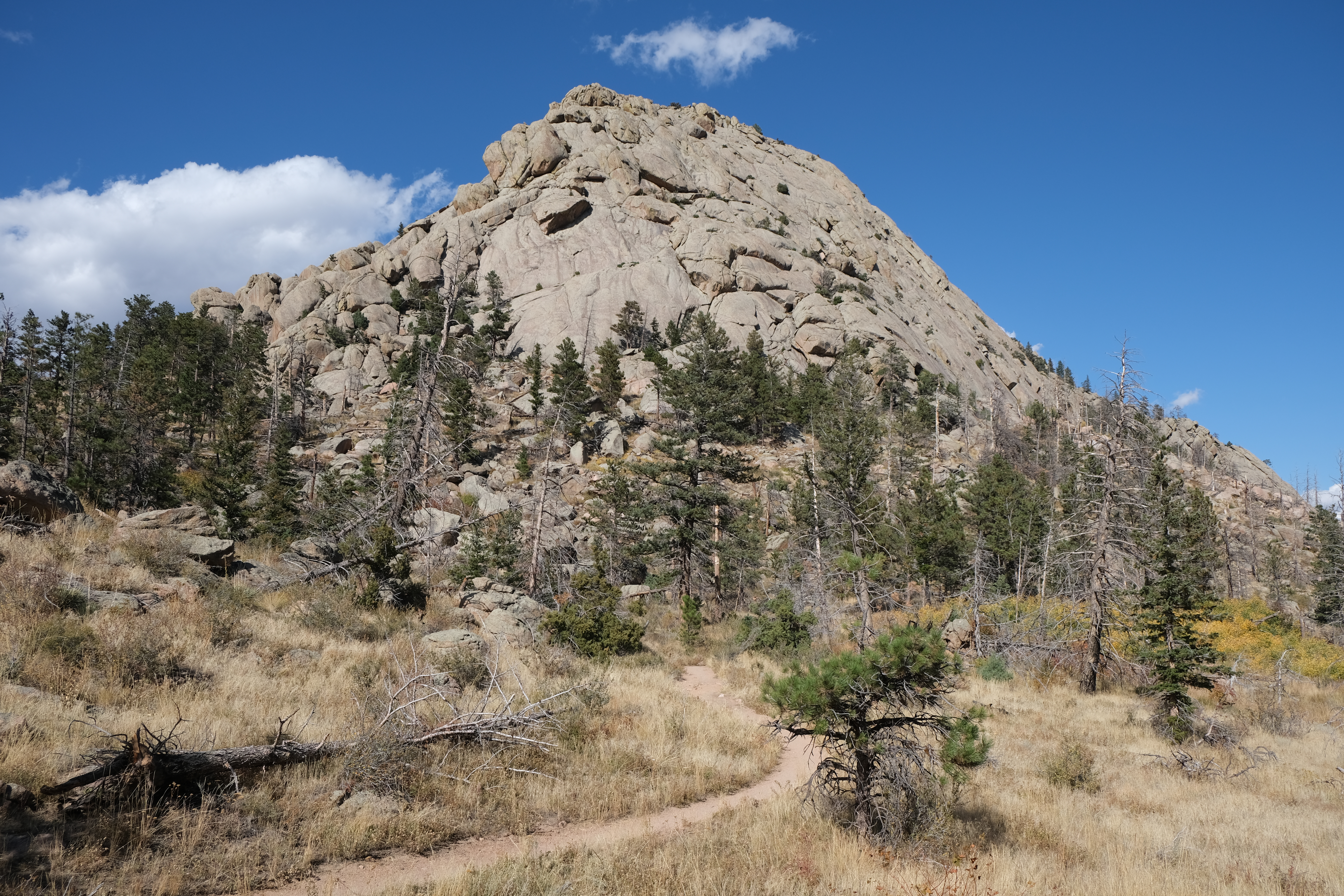
The National Recreation Trail approaching Greyrock Mountain
