= Round Mountain National Recreation Trail =

Hiking trail in Colorado, United States

Coordinates: 40°25′12.7″N 105°17′6.9″W

- Length: 4.7 miles (7.6 km)
- Location: 1211 US Highway 34 Loveland, Colorado 80538
- Designation: National Recreation Trail
- Use: Hiking
- Elevation change: 2,679 feet (817 m)
- Highest point: Sheep Mountain - Summit Adventure Trail, 8,456 feet (2,577 m)
- Lowest point: Trailhead, 5,777 feet (1,761 m)
- Difficulty: Moderate to Strenuous
- Website: http://www.cityofloveland.org/index.aspx?page=1102

Round Mountain National Recreation Trail is a hiking trail in Roosevelt National Forest west of Loveland, Colorado. The trail was designated a National Recreation Trail in 1981.
