= Mount McConnel National Recreation Trail =

Hiking trail in Colorado, United States

Coordinates: 40°40′58″N 105°27′50″W

Mount McConnel Trail
- Length: 2.3 miles (3.7 km)
- Established: 1936
- Designation: National Recreation Trail
- Use: Hiking
- Elevation change: 2,010 ft (610 m)
- Highest point: Mount McConnel summit, 7,980 feet (2,430 m)
- Lowest point: Trailhead, 6,646 feet (2,026 m)
- Difficulty: Moderate

Mount McConnel National Recreation Trail is a hiking trail in the Cache La Poudre Wilderness of Roosevelt National Forest west of Fort Collins, Colorado. The trail leading from Fort Collins Mountain Park to the summit of Mount McConnel was constructed by the Civilian Conservation Corps in 1936. Designation as a National Recreation Trail was in 1981.
