= Larimer County, Colorado =

County in Colorado, United States

- County
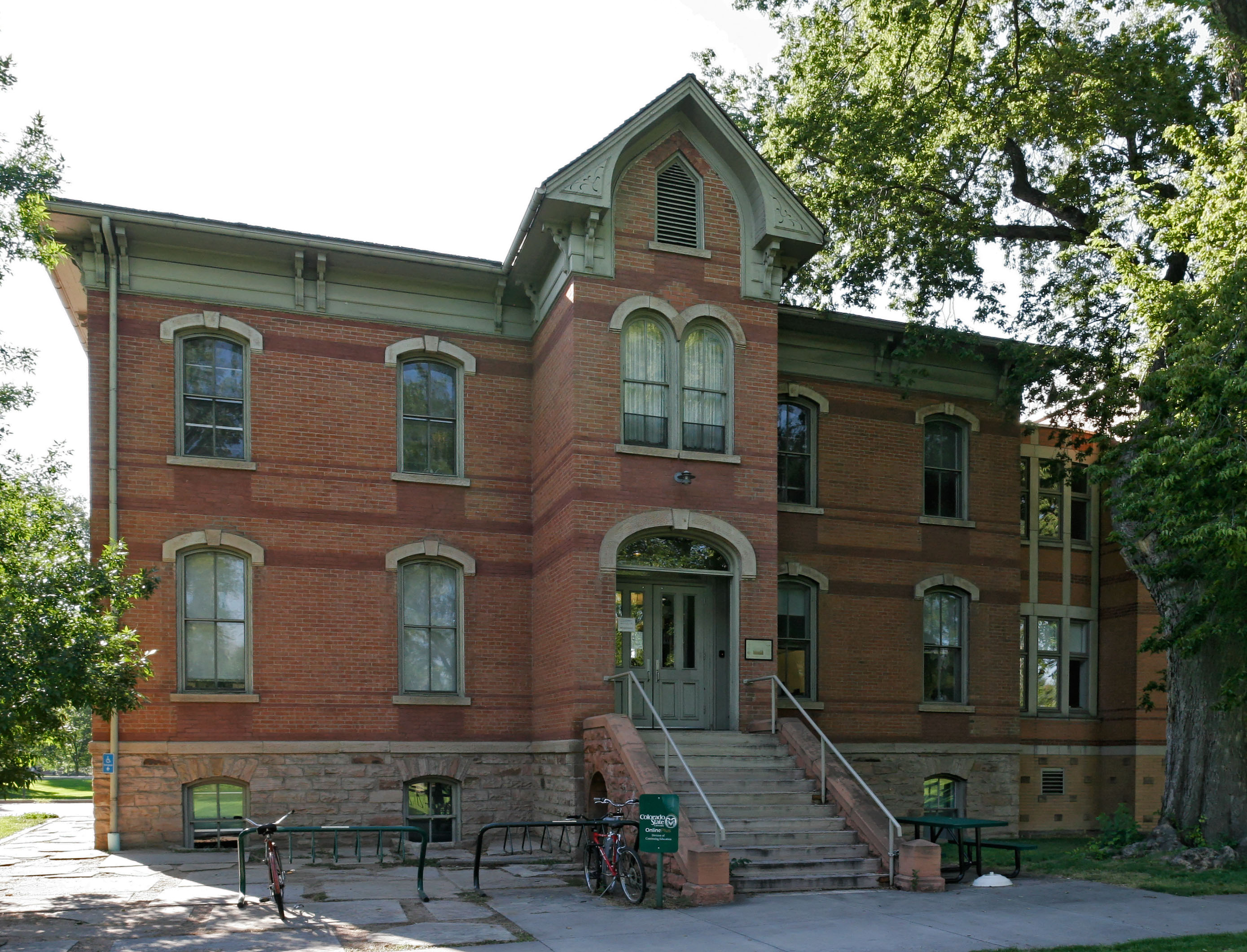
- Colorado State University Historic Spruce Hall

- Location within the U.S. state of Colorado
- Coordinates: 40.65°N 105.46°W
- Country: United States
- State: Colorado
- Founded: November 1, 1861
- Named for: William Larimer, Jr.
- Seat: Fort Collins
- Largest city: Fort Collins

Area
  - Total: 2,634 sq mi (6,820 km^{2})
  - Land: 2,596 sq mi (6,720 km^{2})
  - Water: 38 sq mi (98 km^{2}) 1.4%

Population (2020)
  - Total: 359,066
  - Estimate (2025): 377,292▲
  - Density: 138.3/sq mi (53.40/km^{2})
- Time zone: UTC−7 (Mountain)
  - Summer (DST): UTC−6 (MDT)
- Congressional districts: 2nd, 4th, 8th
- Website: www.larimer.gov

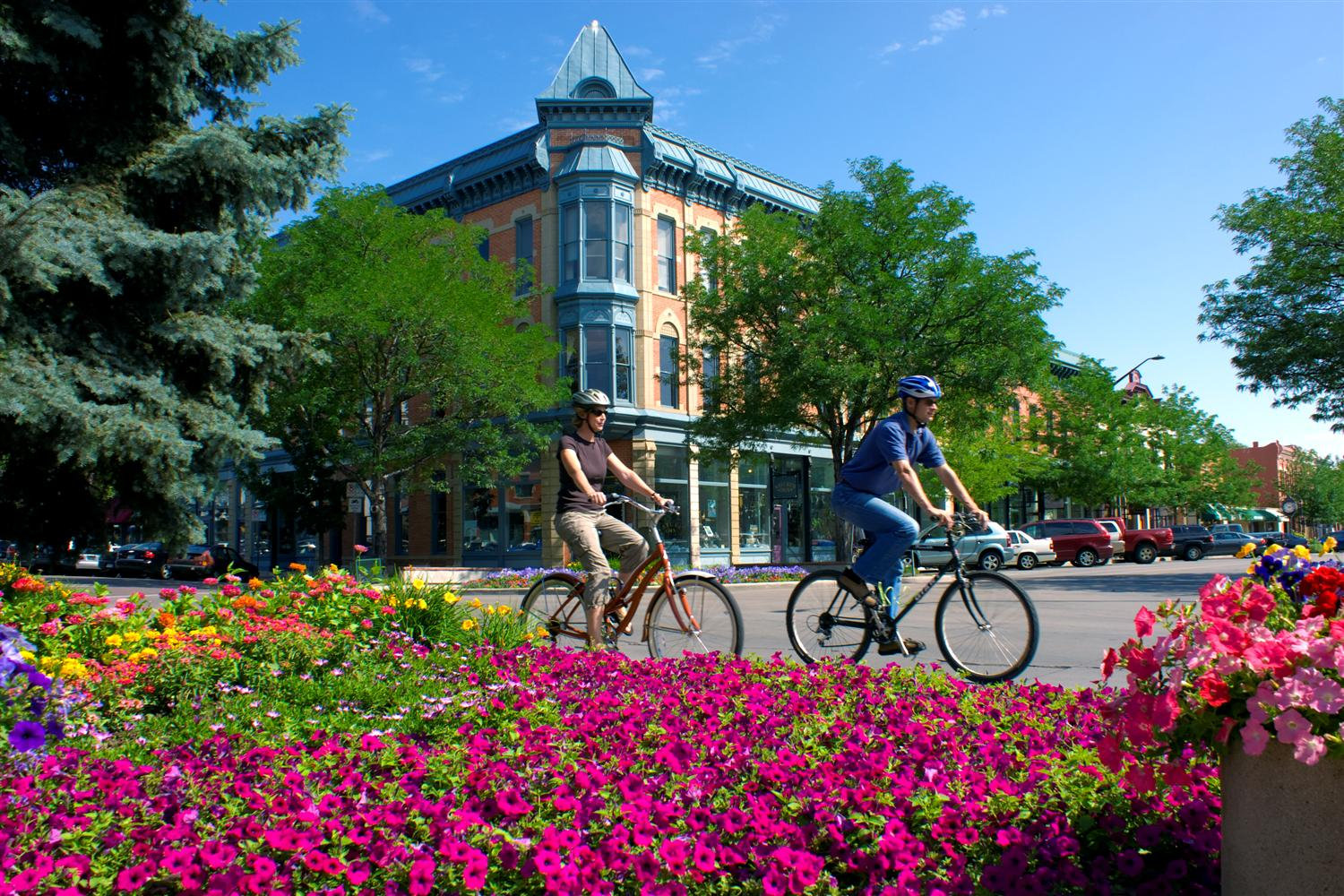
Downtown "Old Town" Fort Collins

Larimer County is a county located in the U.S. state of Colorado. As of the 2020 census, the population was 359,066. The county seat and most populous city is Fort Collins. The county was named for William Larimer, Jr., the founder of Denver. Larimer County comprises the Fort Collins–Loveland metropolitan area, a United States Office of Management and Budget (OMB) defined Metropolitan Statistical Area (MSA). The Fort Collins–Loveland MSA is the 150th most populous MSA in the United States. The county is located at the northern end of the Front Range, at the edge of the Colorado Eastern Plains along the border with Wyoming.

== History ==
Larimer County was created in 1861, and was named after General William Larimer.

Unlike that of much of Colorado, which was founded on the mining of gold and silver, the settlement of Larimer County was based almost entirely on agriculture, an industry that few thought possible in the region during the initial days of the Colorado Gold Rush. The mining boom almost entirely passed the county by. It would take the introduction of irrigation to the region in the 1860s to bring the first widespread settlement to the area.

=== Early history ===
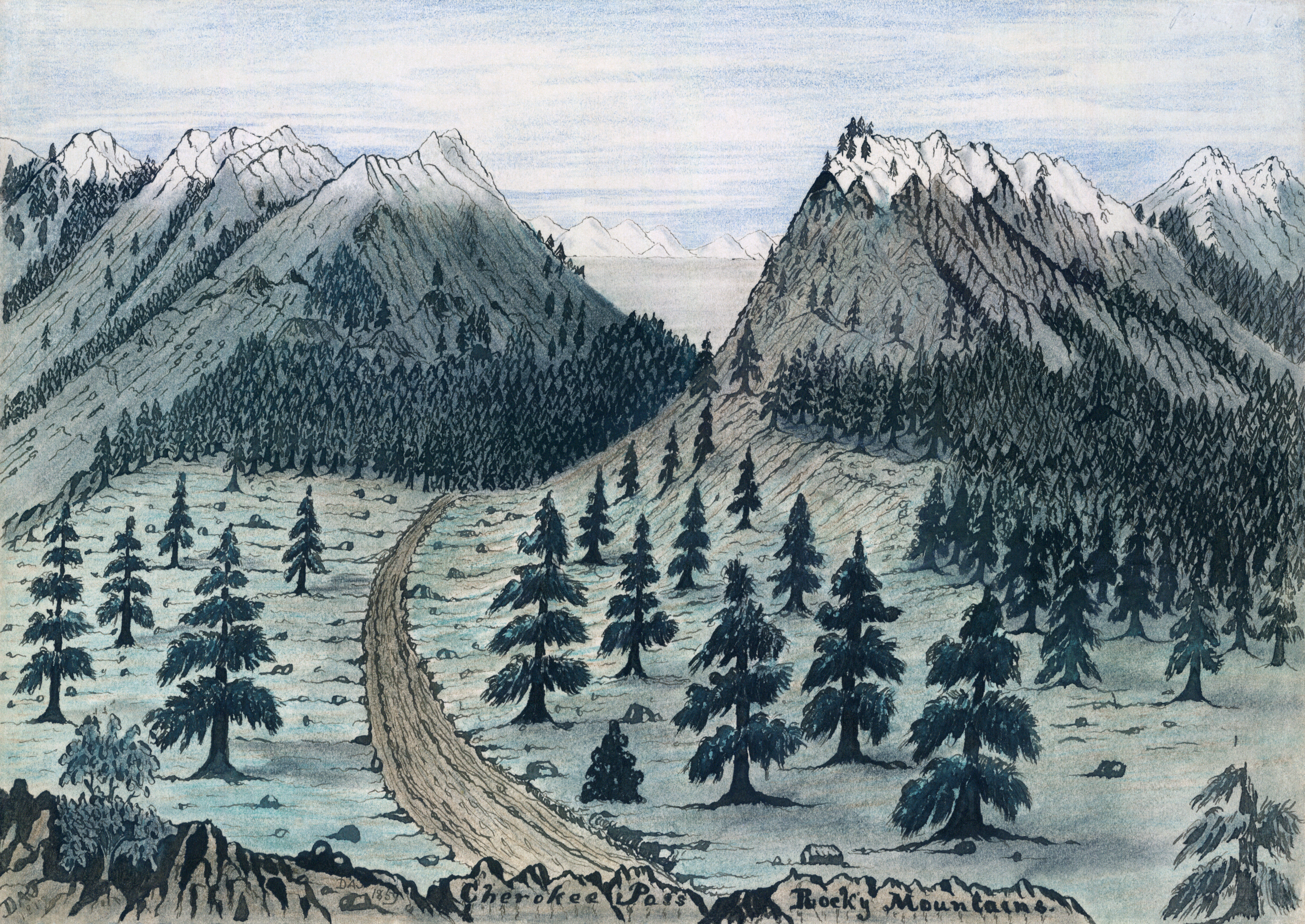
Wagon trail pass near Fort Collins, Colorado, from a June 7, 1859, sketch

At the time of the arrival of Europeans in the early 19th century, the present-day county was occupied by Native Americans, with the Utes occupying the mountainous areas and the Cheyenne and Arapaho living on the piedmont areas along the base of the foothills. French fur trappers infiltrated the area in the early decades of the 19th century, soon after the area became part of the United States with the Louisiana Purchase and was organized as part of the Missouri Territory. In 1828 William H. Ashley ascended the Cache la Poudre River on his way to the Green River in present-day Utah. The river itself received its name in the middle 1830s from an obscure incident in which French-speaking trappers hid gunpowder along its banks, somewhere near present-day Laporte or Bellvue. In 1848 a group of Cherokee crossed through the county following the North Fork of the Poudre to the Laramie Plains on their way to California along a route that became known as the Cherokee Trail.

The area of county was officially opened to white settlement following negotiations with the Cheyenne and Arapaho in the 1858 Treaty of Fort Laramie, by which time the area was part of the Nebraska Territory. The first U.S. settlers arrived that same year in a party led by Antoine Janis from Fort Laramie. Janis, who had visited the area near Bellvue in 1844 and proclaimed it "the most beautiful place on earth", returned to file his official claim and helped found the first U.S. settlement in present-day Colorado, called Colona, just west of Laporte. Nearly simultaneously, Mariano Medina established Fort Namaqua along the Big Thompson River just west of present-day Loveland. The first irrigation canals were established along the Poudre in the 1860s.

In 1862, the settlement established by Janis became a stagecoach stop along the Overland Stage Route which was established because of threats of attacks from Native Americans on the northern trails in Wyoming. In 1861, Laporte was designated as the first county seat after the organization of the Colorado Territory. In 1862, the United States Army established an outpost near Laporte that was designated as Camp Collins. A devastating flood in June 1864 wiped out the outpost, forcing the Army to seek a better location. At the urging of Joseph Mason, who had settled along the Poudre in 1860, the Army relocated its post downstream adjacent to Mason's land along the Overland stage route. The site of the new post became the nucleus of the town of Fort Collins, incorporated in 1873 after the withdrawal of the Army. By that time, Mason and others had convinced the Colorado Territorial Legislature to designate the new town as the county seat. In 1870, the legislature designated Fort Collins as the location of the state agricultural college (later Colorado State University), although the institution would exist only on paper for another 9 years while local residents sought money to construct the first campus buildings. In 1873, Robert A. Cameron and other members of the Greeley Colony established the Fort Collins Agricultural Colony, which greatly expanded the grid plan and population of Fort Collins.

=== Railroads ===
One of the primary goals of the early citizens of the county was the courting of railroads. County residents were disappointed when the Denver Pacific Railroad bypassed the county in 1870 in favor of Greeley. The first railroad finally arrived in the county in 1877 when the Colorado Central Railroad extended a line north from Golden via Longmont to Cheyenne. The town council of Fort Collins designated right-of-way through the center of town (and through the campus of the unbuilt college) for the line, creating a contentious issue to this day.

Along the new railroad sprung up the new platted towns of Loveland and Berthoud, named respectively after the president and chief surveyor of the Colorado Central. Likewise, Wellington (founded in 1903) was named for a railroad employee. The Greeley, Salt Lake, and Pacific Railroad arrived three years later as a subsidiary of the Union Pacific Railroad, with the intention of creating a transcontinental line over Cameron Pass. Although the line was never extended over the mountains, it opened up the quarrying of stone for the railroad at Stout, furnishing another industry for the region. The brief attempt at the mining of gold in the region centered at the now ghost town of Manhattan in the Poudre Canyon.

=== Agriculture ===
The early growth of agriculture, which depended highly on direct river irrigation, experienced a second boom in 1902 with the introduction of the cultivation of sugar beets, accompanied by the construction of the large processing plant of the Great Western Sugar Co. in Loveland. In the following decade, the sugar beet industry brought large numbers of German emigrants from the Russian Empire to the county. The neighborhoods of Fort Collins northeast of the Poudre were constructed largely to house these new families.

A significant increase in the agricultural productivity of the region came in the 1930s with the construction of the Colorado Big Thompson Project following the Great Depression, sort of a third boom for the agricultural industry around Fort Collins. This project collected and captured Western Slope water, and carried it over to the Front Range Colorado counties of Boulder, Larimer, and Weld, along with extensive water storage and distribution system, which significantly extended the irrigable growing season and brought substantial additional land under irrigation for the first time.

== Geography ==
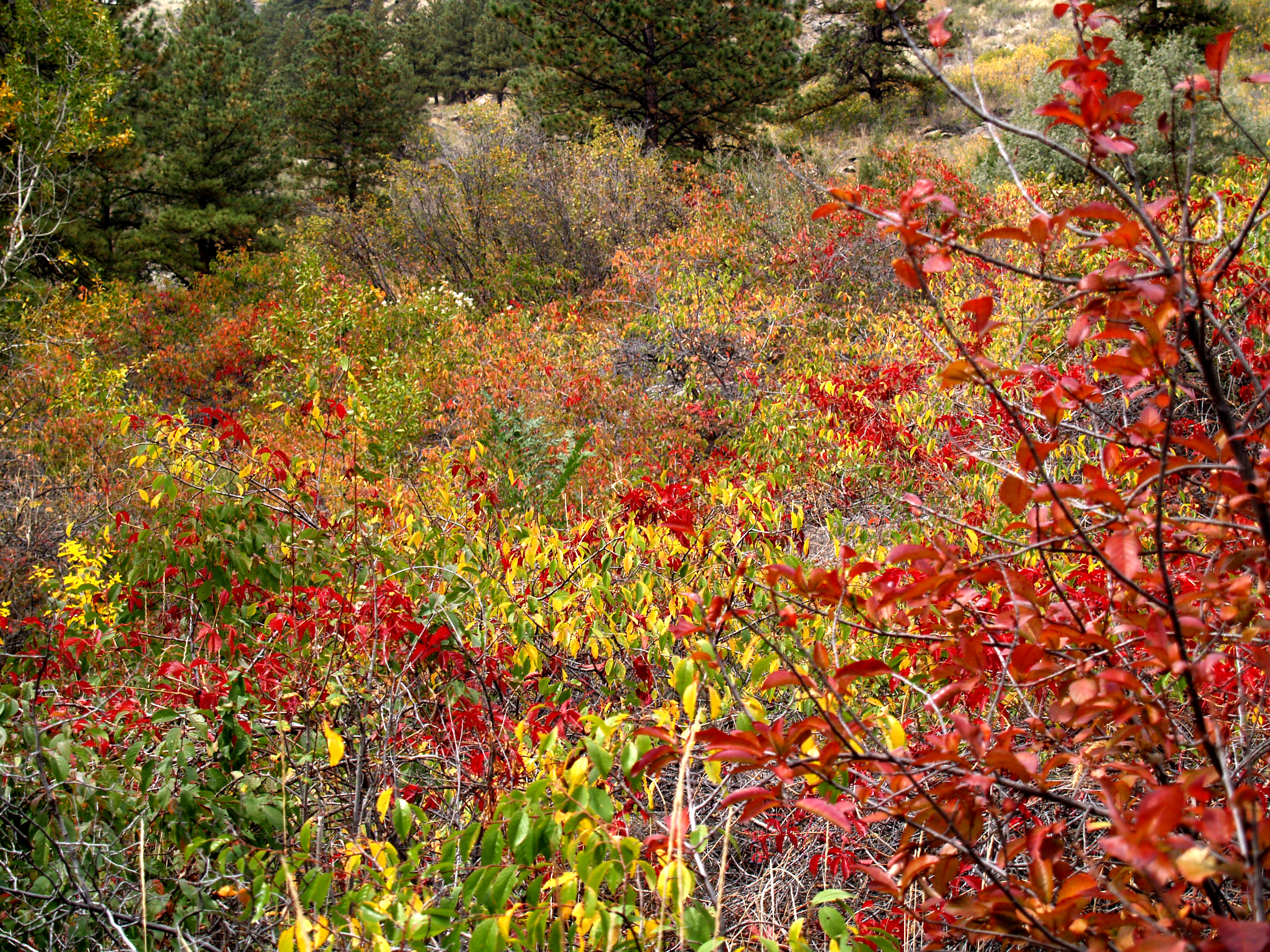
Fall colors, Poudre Canyon

According to the U.S. Census Bureau, the county has a total area of 2,634 square miles (6,820 km^{2}), of which 2,596 square miles (6,720 km^{2}) is land and 38 square miles (98 km^{2}) (1.4%) is water.

=== Adjacent counties ===
- Laramie County, Wyoming—northeast
- Weld County—east
- Boulder County—south
- Grand County—southwest
- Jackson County—west
- Albany County, Wyoming—northwest

=== Major highways ===
- Interstate 25
- U.S. Highway 34
- U.S. Highway 36
- U.S. Highway 87
- U.S. Highway 287
- State Highway 1
- State Highway 7
- State Highway 14
- State Highway 56
- State Highway 60
- State Highway 66
- State Highway 392
- State Highway 402

=== National protected areas ===
- Cache La Poudre Wilderness
- Comanche Peak Wilderness
- Neota Wilderness
- Rawah Wilderness
- Rocky Mountain National Park
- Roosevelt National Forest

=== State protected areas ===
- Boyd Lake State Park
- Lory State Park

== Demographics ==
Historical population
Census	Pop.	Note	%±
1870	838		—
1880	4,892		483.8%
1890	9,712		98.5%
1900	12,168		25.3%
1910	25,270		107.7%
1920	27,872		10.3%
1930	33,137		18.9%
1940	35,539		7.2%
1950	43,554		22.6%
1960	53,343		22.5%
1970	89,900		68.5%
1980	149,184		65.9%
1990	186,136		24.8%
2000	251,494		35.1%
2010	299,630		19.1%
2020	359,066		19.8%
2025 (est.)	377,292	▲	5.1%
U.S. Decennial Census; 1790–1960 1900–1990; 1990–2000 2010–2020

=== 2020 census ===
As of the 2020 census, the county had a population of 359,066. Of the residents, 19.4% were under the age of 18 and 17.0% were 65 years of age or older; the median age was 37.4 years. For every 100 females there were 98.1 males, and for every 100 females age 18 and over there were 96.5 males. 89.8% of residents lived in urban areas and 10.2% lived in rural areas.

Larimer County, Colorado – Racial and ethnic composition Note: the US Census treats Hispanic/Latino as an ethnic category. This table excludes Latinos from the racial categories and assigns them to a separate category. Hispanics/Latinos may be of any race.
Race / Ethnicity (NH = Non-Hispanic)	Pop 2000	Pop 2010	Pop 2020	% 2000	% 2010	% 2020
White alone (NH)	220,159	253,047	282,581	87.54%	84.45%	78.70%
Black or African American alone (NH)	1,511	2,259	3,448	0.60%	0.75%	0.96%
Native American or Alaska Native alone (NH)	1,171	1,277	1,495	0.47%	0.43%	0.42%
Asian alone (NH)	3,840	5,675	8,365	1.53%	1.89%	2.33%
Pacific Islander alone (NH)	152	192	265	0.06%	0.06%	0.07%
Other race alone (NH)	234	347	1,819	0.09%	0.12%	0.51%
Mixed race or Multiracial (NH)	3,616	5,205	16,431	1.44%	1.74%	4.58%
Hispanic or Latino (any race)	20,811	31,628	44,662	8.27%	10.56%	12.44%
Total	251,494	299,630	359,066	100.00%	100.00%	100.00%

The racial makeup of the county was 82.4% White, 1.1% Black or African American, 0.8% American Indian and Alaska Native, 2.4% Asian, 0.1% Native Hawaiian and Pacific Islander, 3.8% from some other race, and 9.4% from two or more races. Hispanic or Latino residents of any race comprised 12.4% of the population.

There were 144,360 households in the county, of which 26.0% had children under the age of 18 living with them and 24.6% had a female householder with no spouse or partner present. About 26.2% of all households were made up of individuals and 10.2% had someone living alone who was 65 years of age or older.

There were 158,769 housing units, of which 9.1% were vacant. Among occupied housing units, 63.8% were owner-occupied and 36.2% were renter-occupied. The homeowner vacancy rate was 1.2% and the rental vacancy rate was 6.8%.

== Communities ==
=== Cities ===
- Fort Collins
- Loveland

=== Towns ===
- Berthoud (partially in Larimer and partially in Weld county)
- Estes Park
- Johnstown (partially in Larimer and partially in Weld county)
- Timnath
- Wellington
- Windsor (partially in Larimer and partially in Weld County)

=== Census-designated places ===
- LaPorte
- Red Feather Lakes

=== Unincorporated communities ===
- Bellvue
- Buckeye
- Campion
- Cherokee Park
- Drake
- Glendevey
- Glen Haven
- Livermore
- Kinikinik
- Masonville
- Norfolk
- Pinewood Springs
- Pingree Park
- Poudre Park
- Rustic
- Spencer Heights
- Virginia Dale
- Waverly

=== Ghost towns ===
- Manhattan
- Old Roach

== Politics ==
United States presidential election results for Larimer County, Colorado
Year	Republican		Democratic		Third party(ies)	
Year	No.	%	No.	%	No.	%
1880	646	53.26%	388	31.99%	179	14.76%
1884	1,038	54.01%	644	33.51%	240	12.49%
1888	1,322	58.31%	769	33.92%	176	7.76%
1892	975	43.05%	0	0.00%	1,290	56.95%
1896	734	18.11%	3,195	78.83%	124	3.06%
1900	2,343	45.84%	2,456	48.05%	312	6.10%
1904	4,138	62.64%	2,070	31.34%	398	6.02%
1908	4,489	51.09%	3,629	41.30%	668	7.60%
1912	1,932	26.98%	2,597	36.27%	2,632	36.75%
1916	2,797	34.18%	4,868	59.49%	518	6.33%
1920	5,487	64.34%	2,708	31.75%	333	3.90%
1924	6,538	66.65%	1,970	20.08%	1,301	13.26%
1928	8,213	70.94%	3,203	27.66%	162	1.40%
1932	7,040	49.87%	6,494	46.00%	584	4.14%
1936	7,243	47.59%	7,521	49.41%	457	3.00%
1940	10,720	62.15%	6,402	37.12%	126	0.73%
1944	9,914	65.46%	5,172	34.15%	58	0.38%
1948	9,813	57.63%	7,062	41.47%	154	0.90%
1952	14,484	72.93%	5,266	26.52%	110	0.55%
1956	14,364	71.77%	5,612	28.04%	39	0.19%
1960	15,671	67.39%	7,550	32.47%	34	0.15%
1964	11,636	47.33%	12,776	51.97%	173	0.70%
1968	18,438	62.13%	9,152	30.84%	2,086	7.03%
1972	27,462	65.02%	13,731	32.51%	1,041	2.46%
1976	32,169	60.72%	19,005	35.87%	1,809	3.41%
1980	36,240	56.51%	17,072	26.62%	10,817	16.87%
1984	49,883	66.65%	23,896	31.93%	1,069	1.43%
1988	45,967	55.34%	35,703	42.98%	1,396	1.68%
1992	35,995	36.12%	38,232	38.36%	25,433	25.52%
1996	45,935	47.14%	40,965	42.04%	10,550	10.83%
2000	62,429	52.67%	46,055	38.85%	10,053	8.48%
2004	75,884	51.82%	68,266	46.62%	2,286	1.56%
2008	73,642	44.26%	89,823	53.99%	2,910	1.75%
2012	82,376	45.72%	92,747	51.47%	5,057	2.81%
2016	83,430	42.57%	93,113	47.51%	19,438	9.92%
2020	91,489	40.78%	126,120	56.22%	6,729	3.00%
2024	89,680	39.74%	129,376	57.33%	6,598	2.92%

United States Senate election results for Larimer County, Colorado2
Year	Republican		Democratic		Third party(ies)	
Year	No.	%	No.	%	No.	%
2020	94,585	43.80%	116,419	53.91%	4,929	2.28%

United States Senate election results for Larimer County, Colorado3
Year	Republican		Democratic		Third party(ies)	
Year	No.	%	No.	%	No.	%
2022	69,573	39.69%	100,466	57.32%	5,239	2.99%

Colorado Gubernatorial election results for Larimer County
Year	Republican		Democratic		Third party(ies)	
Year	No.	%	No.	%	No.	%
2022	66,749	37.86%	105,588	59.88%	3,991	2.26%

Larimer was long a Republican stronghold. Between 1920 and 2004, the only Democratic presidential candidate to win a majority of votes in the county was Lyndon Johnson in 1964. However, increasing urbanization, as well as the influence of Colorado State University, caused the Republican margins to decline steadily in the 1990s and early 2000s. In 2008, Barack Obama became the first Democrat to carry the county with the majority of the vote since 1964, and in so doing recorded the best performance by a Democrat since the days of Woodrow Wilson and William Jennings Bryan. In 2020, Joe Biden's margin of victory was even greater and in 2024, Larimer was one of the few counties nationwide to swing towards Kamala Harris.

The city of Fort Collins, which is heavily Democratic, dominates the county's population and thus solidifies its Democratic leaning, and other Democratic areas include Estes Park and some of the more rural, mountainous areas of the central part of the county. The city of Loveland leans Republican, as do the sparsely populated northern parts of the county.

Larimer County is a state-level bellwether county; as of the 2024 election, it has voted for the statewide winner in every election since 1948, when Harry Truman carried Colorado without it.

== Education ==
- Park R3 (Estes Park)
- Poudre School District (Fort Collins & surrounding area)
- Thompson School District (Berthoud & Loveland)

Fort Collins is home to Colorado State University.

== Recreation ==
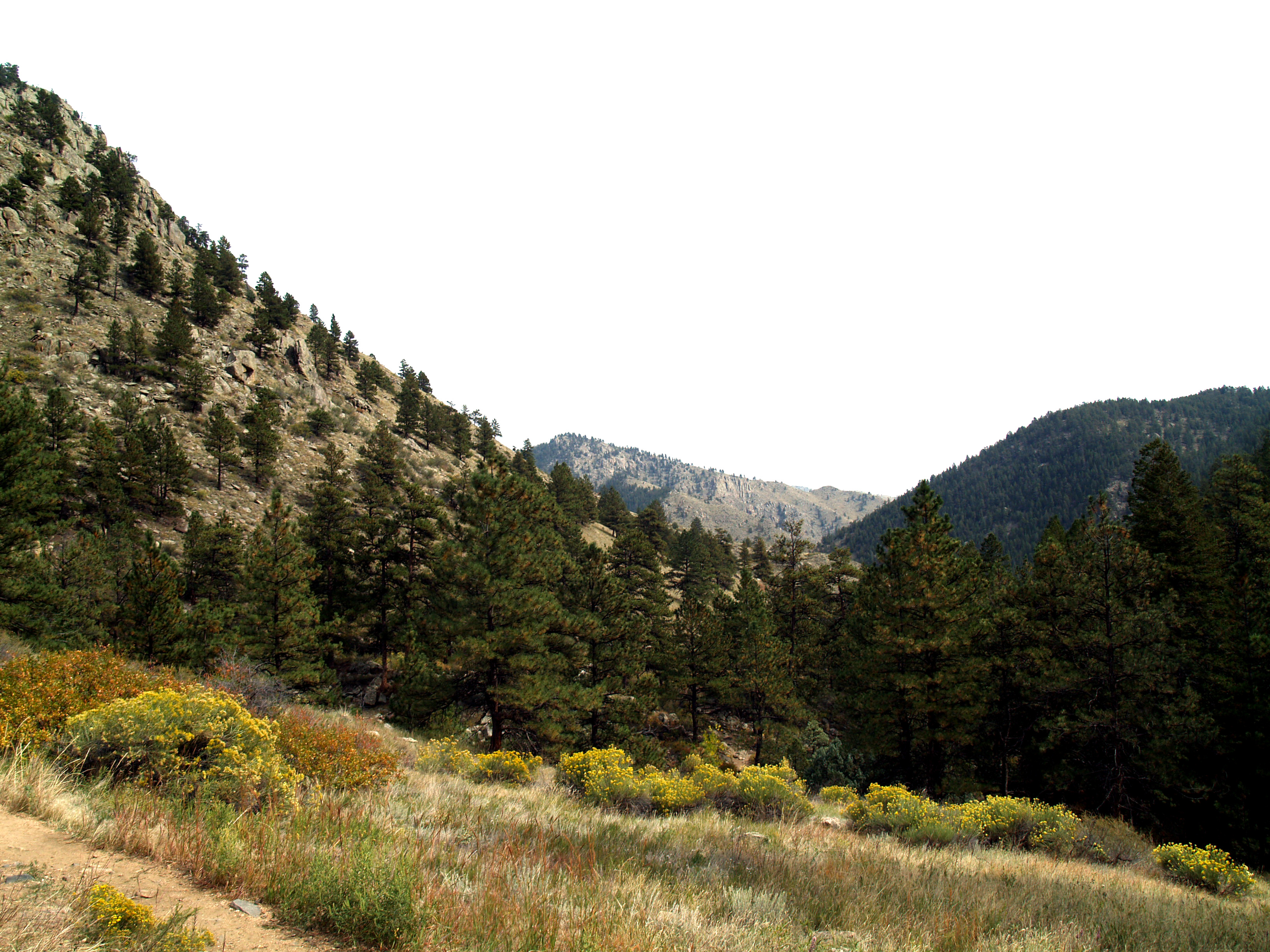
Greyrock Mountain trail

=== Prehistoric site ===
- Lindenmeier Site

=== National trails ===
- Continental Divide National Scenic Trail
- Greyrock Mountain National Recreation Trail
- Mount McConnel National Recreation Trail
- Round Mountain National Recreation Trail

=== Bicycle routes ===
- Cathy Fromme Prairie Natural Area
- Fossil Creek Trail
- Great Parks Bicycle Route
- Loveland's Recreation Trail
- Mason Trail
- Poudre River Trail
- Power Trail
- Spring Creek Trail

=== Scenic byways ===
- Big Thompson Canyon
- Poudre Canyon
- Front Range
- Horsetooth Mountain
- Medicine Bow Mountains

== See also ==
- Bibliography of Colorado
- Geography of Colorado
- History of Colorado
  - Heele County, Jefferson Territory
  - National Register of Historic Places listings in Larimer County, Colorado
- Index of Colorado-related articles
- List of Colorado-related lists
  - List of counties in Colorado
  - List of statistical areas in Colorado
- Outline of Colorado
  - Front Range Urban Corridor
