= Cache La Poudre Wilderness =

Protected area in Colorado, US

- IUCN category Ib (wilderness area)
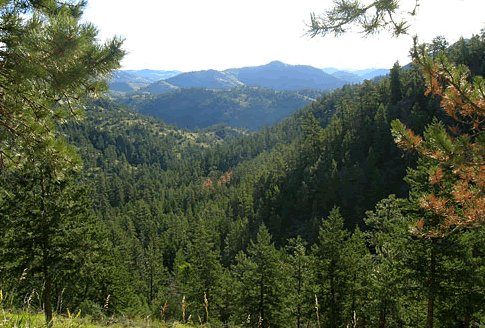

- Location within the United States
- Location: Larimer County, Colorado, USA
- Nearest city: Fort Collins, CO
- Coordinates: 40°40′00″N 105°27′00″W
- Area: 9,258 acres (37.47 km^{2})
- Established: 1980
- Governing body: U.S. Forest Service

The Cache la Poudre Wilderness is federally-protected area administered by the U.S. Forest Service, a division of the U.S. Department of Agriculture. It is located on the Canyon Lakes Ranger District on the Roosevelt National Forest in Colorado. This wilderness covers 9,258 acres (37.47 km^{2}) and is characterized by steep, rugged terrain along the Cache la Poudre River. Elevations in this area varies from 6,200 feet (1,900 m) to 8,600 feet (2,600 m). Only one trail, the Mount McConnel National Recreation Trail that is 3 miles (4.8 km) long, exists in this wilderness, and 9 miles (14 km) of the Little South Fork of the Cache La Poudre River flow through the wilderness.
