= Horsetooth Mountain =

Mountain in Colorado, United States

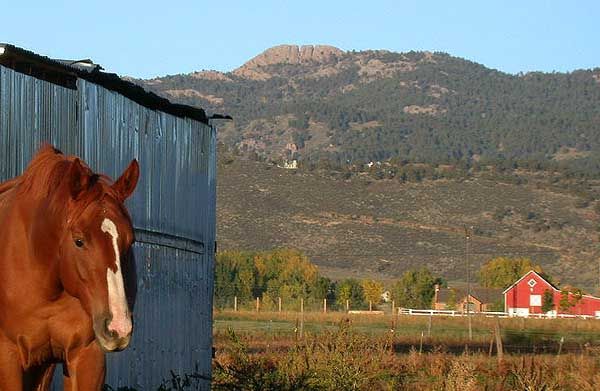
- Horsetooth from Fort Collins

Highest point
- Elevation: 7,259 ft (2,213 m)
- Prominence: 595 ft (181 m)
- Isolation: 3.46 mi (5.57 km)
- Coordinates: 40°32′22″N 105°11′48″W

Geography
- Location within Colorado
- Location: Larimer County, Colorado, U.S.
- Parent range: Front Range foothills
- Topo map(s): USGS 7.5' topographic map Horsetooth Reservoir, Colorado

Climbing
- Easiest route: Scramble

Horsetooth Mountain is a mountain summit in the foothills of the Front Range of the Rocky Mountains of North America. The 7,259-foot (2,213 m) peak is located in the Horsetooth Mountain Open Space, 7.0 miles (11.2 km) west (bearing 265°) of downtown Fort Collins in Larimer County, Colorado, United States.

== Mountain ==
The mountain is easily distinguishable by the large pegmatite rock formation on its summit known as Horsetooth Rock. The formation is a prominent landmark of the nearby city of Fort Collins and often used as a symbol of that city, appearing in the official city seal. The name comes from its distinctive appearance. Horsetooth Reservoir, which lies at the eastern base of the mountain, is named after it, as is Horsetooth Road, a primary east–west thoroughfare in Fort Collins that is located almost directly in line with the summit.

The site was previously private property owned by the Soderberg family. In 1982, it was purchased by the county as an "open space" tax acquisition. It is now a popular destination for hikers as well as mountain bikers, with trails leading to the summit. The summit offers hikers a clear view to the southwest of Longs Peak and Mount Meeker, two rugged mountains in Rocky Mountain National Park.

A daily entrance permit costs $10 per vehicle.

== Wildlife ==
Horsetooth Mountain Park not only hosts some spectacular scenery, it is home to a variety of large mammals such as mule deer, American black bears, mountain lions and coyotes.

== Gallery ==
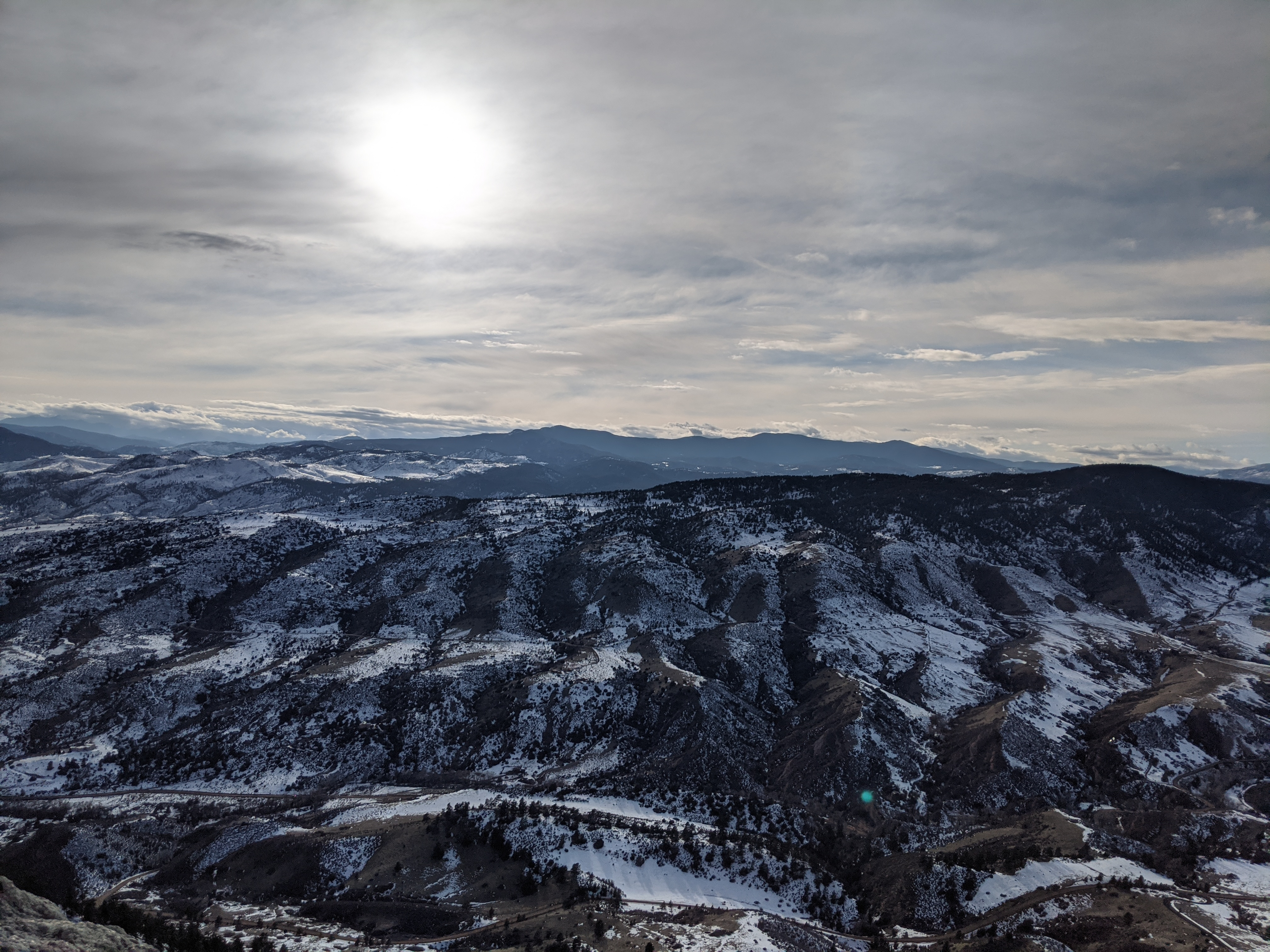
Top of Horsetooth Mountain facing West to the Rocky Mountains.

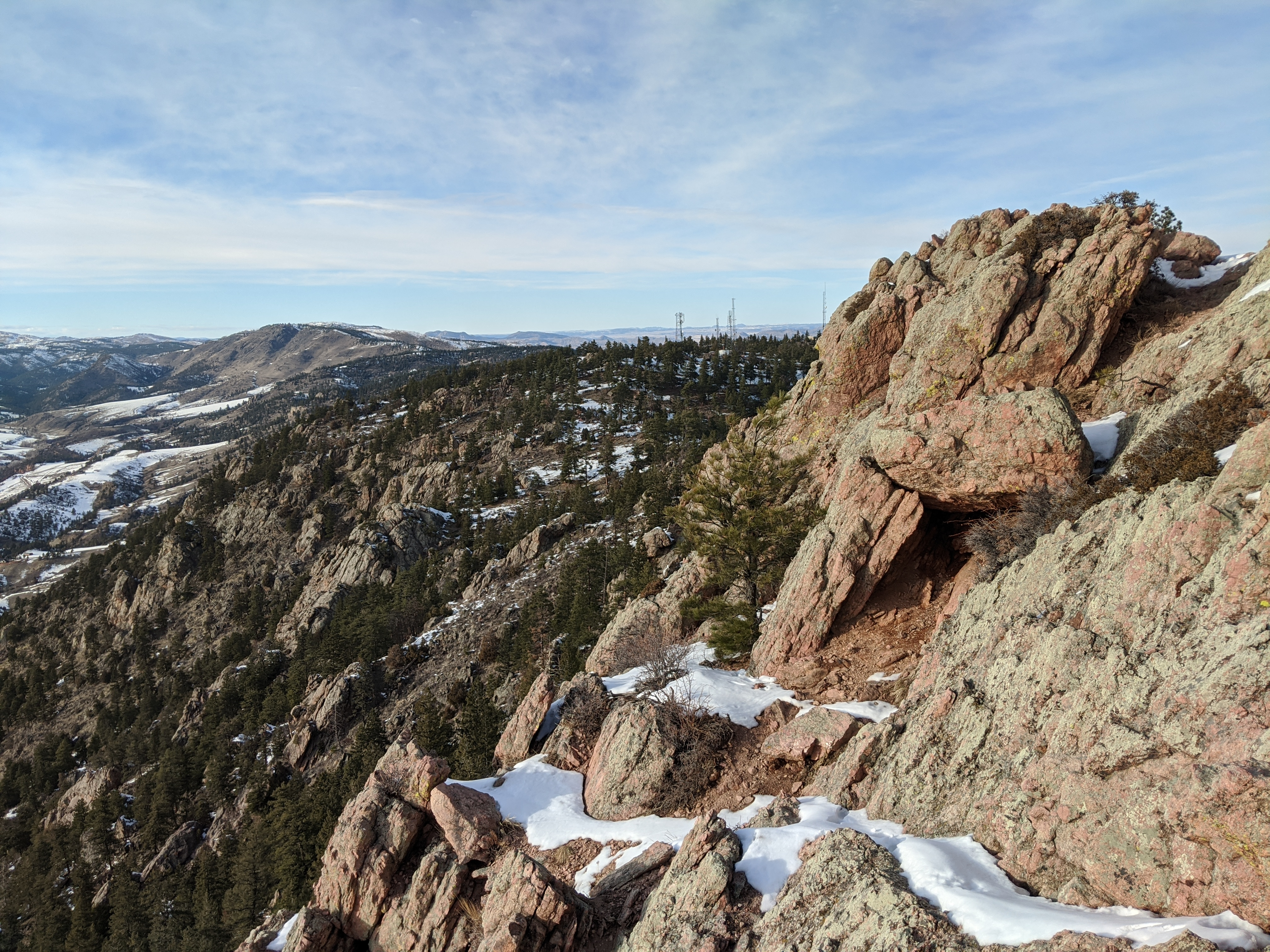
Cellphone towers visible from the top.

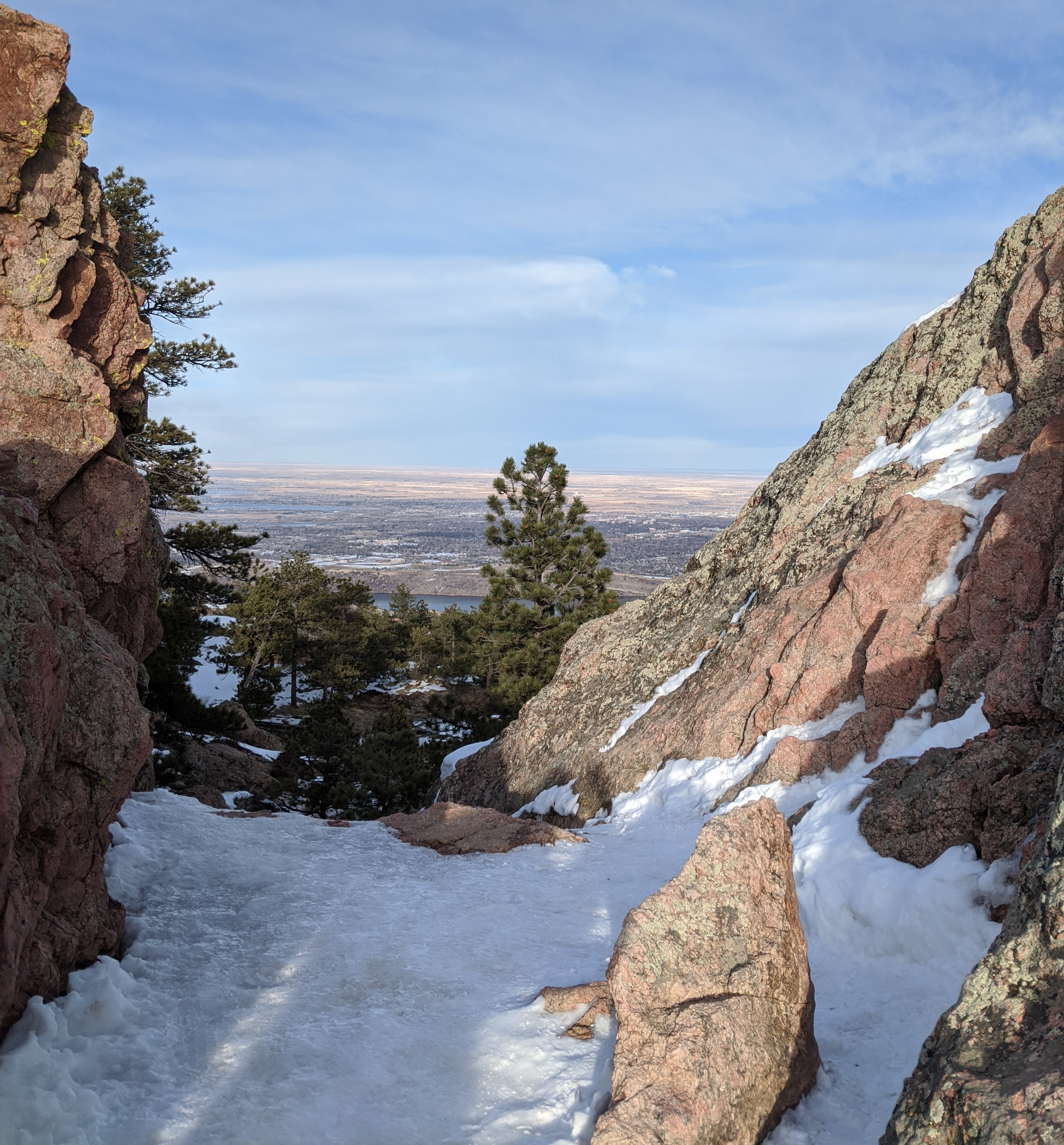
Fort Collins visible from the top.

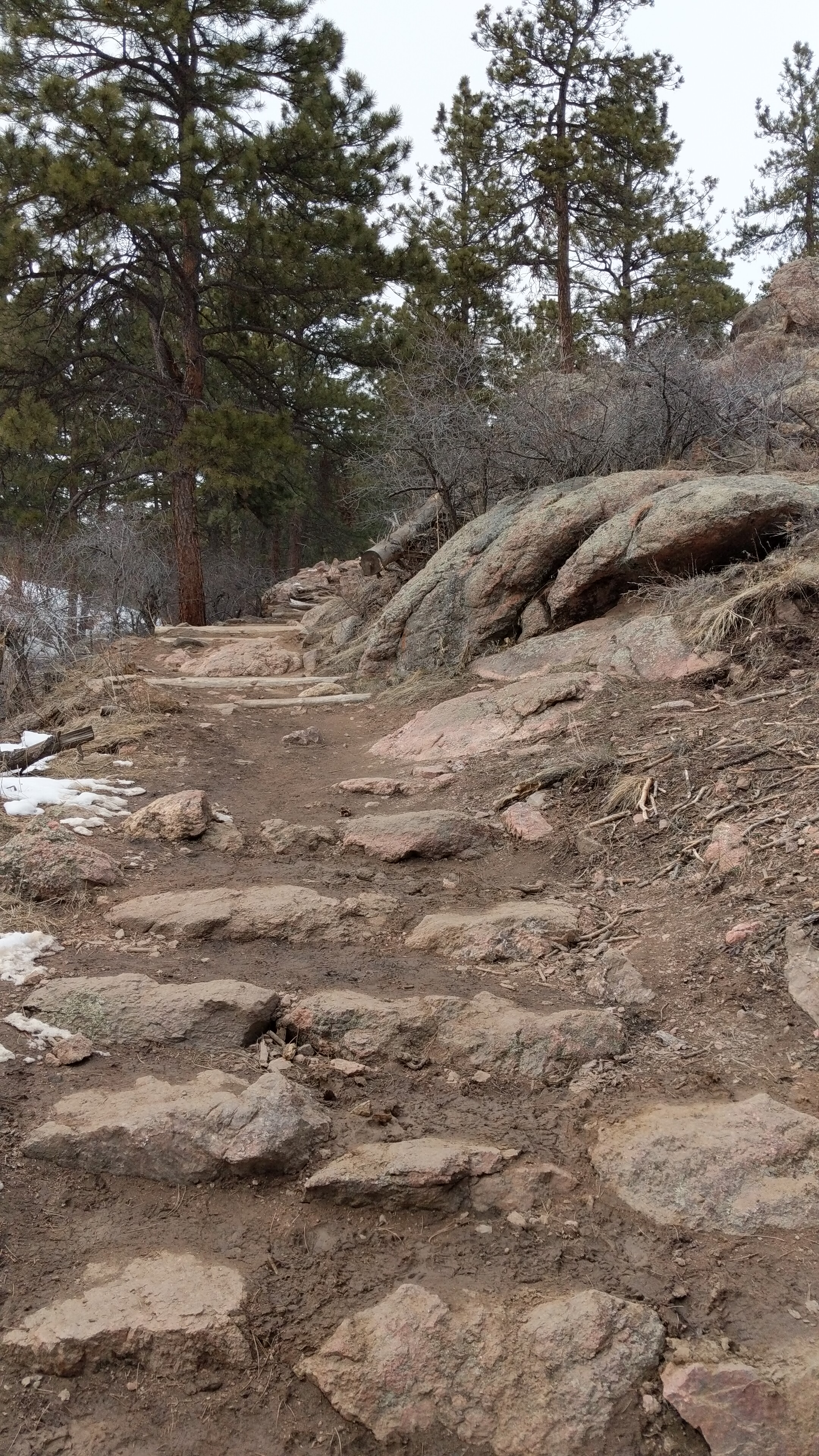
Horsetooth Rock Trail.

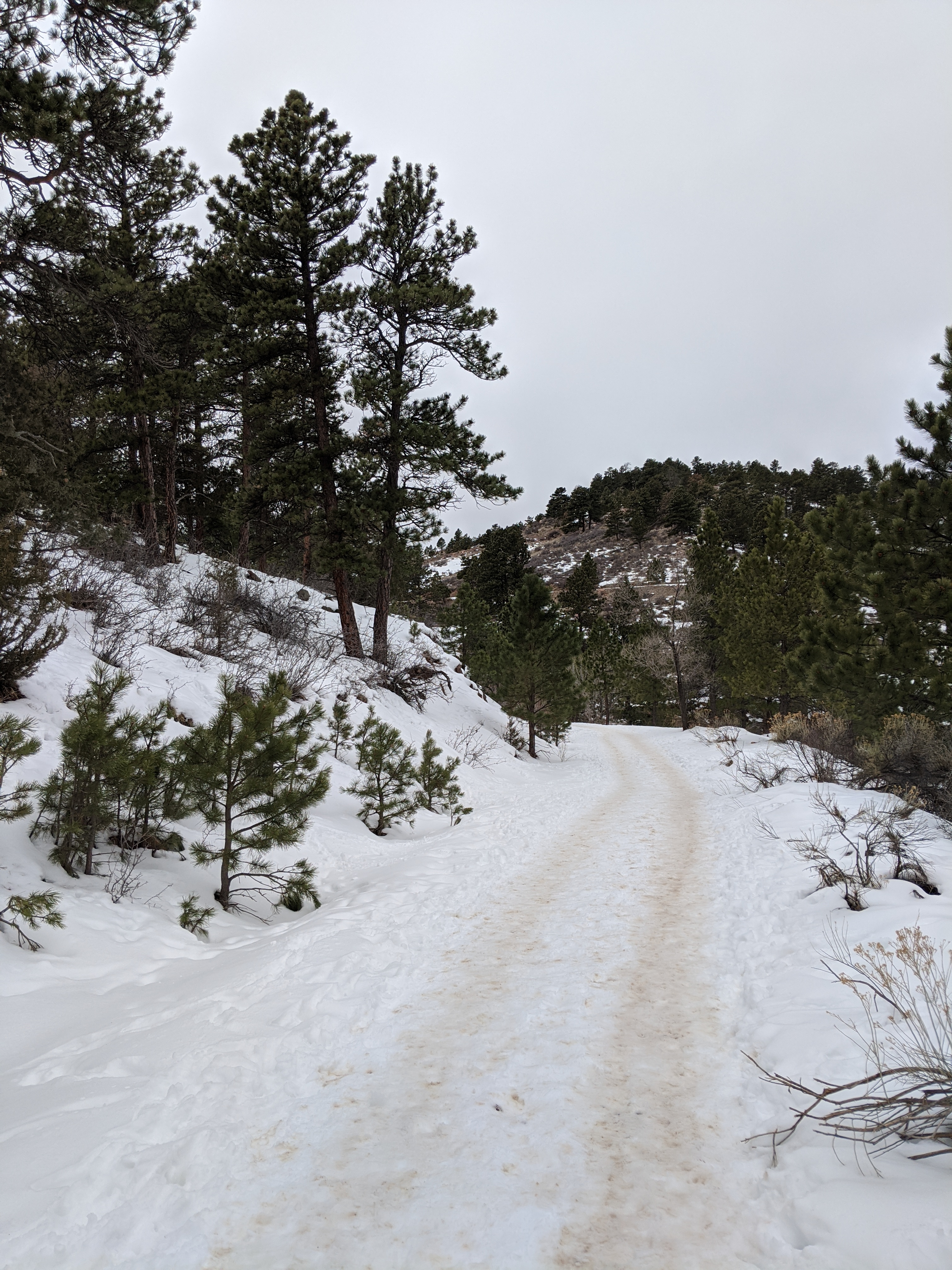
Horsetooth Rock Trail near the beginning.

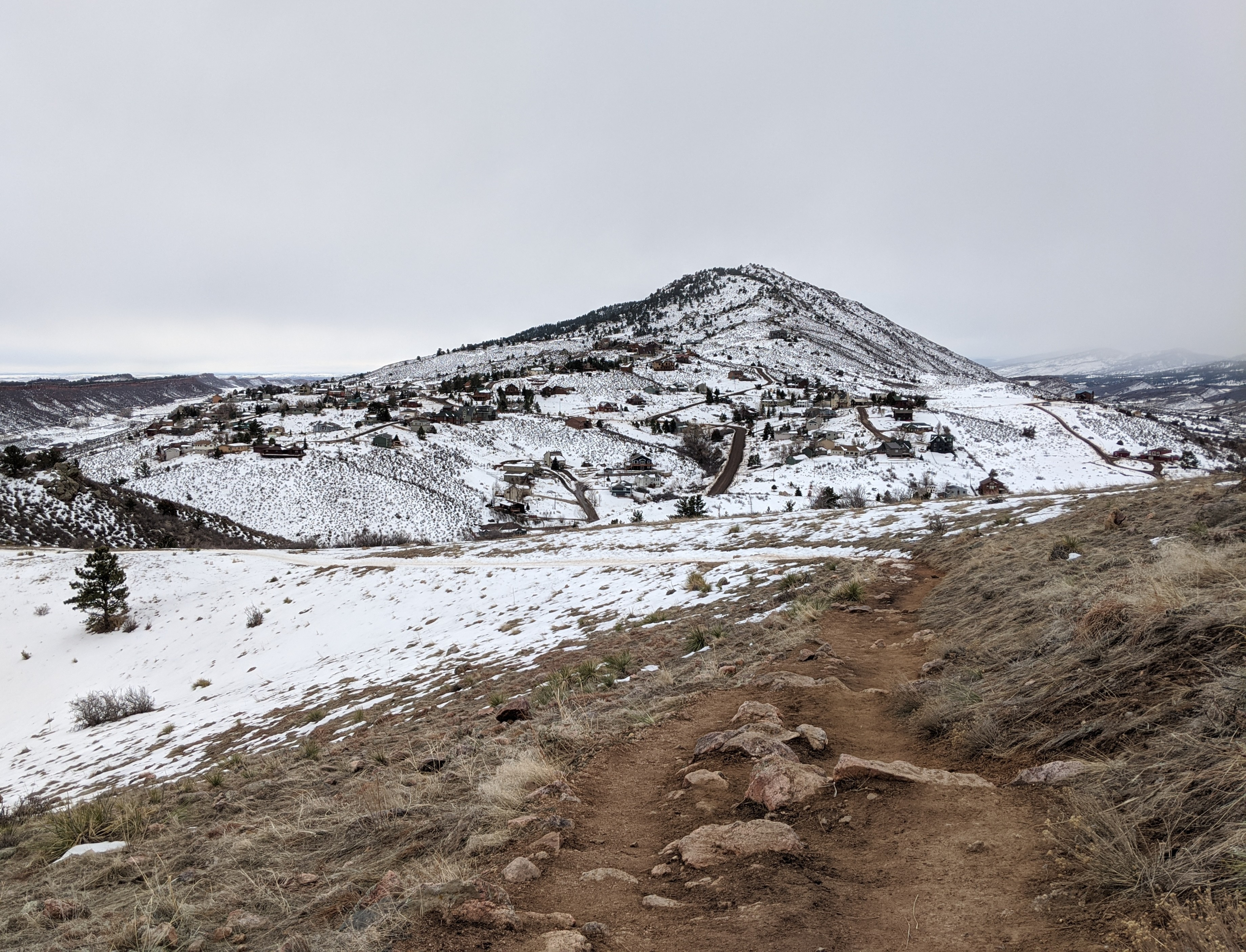
Near the trailhead.

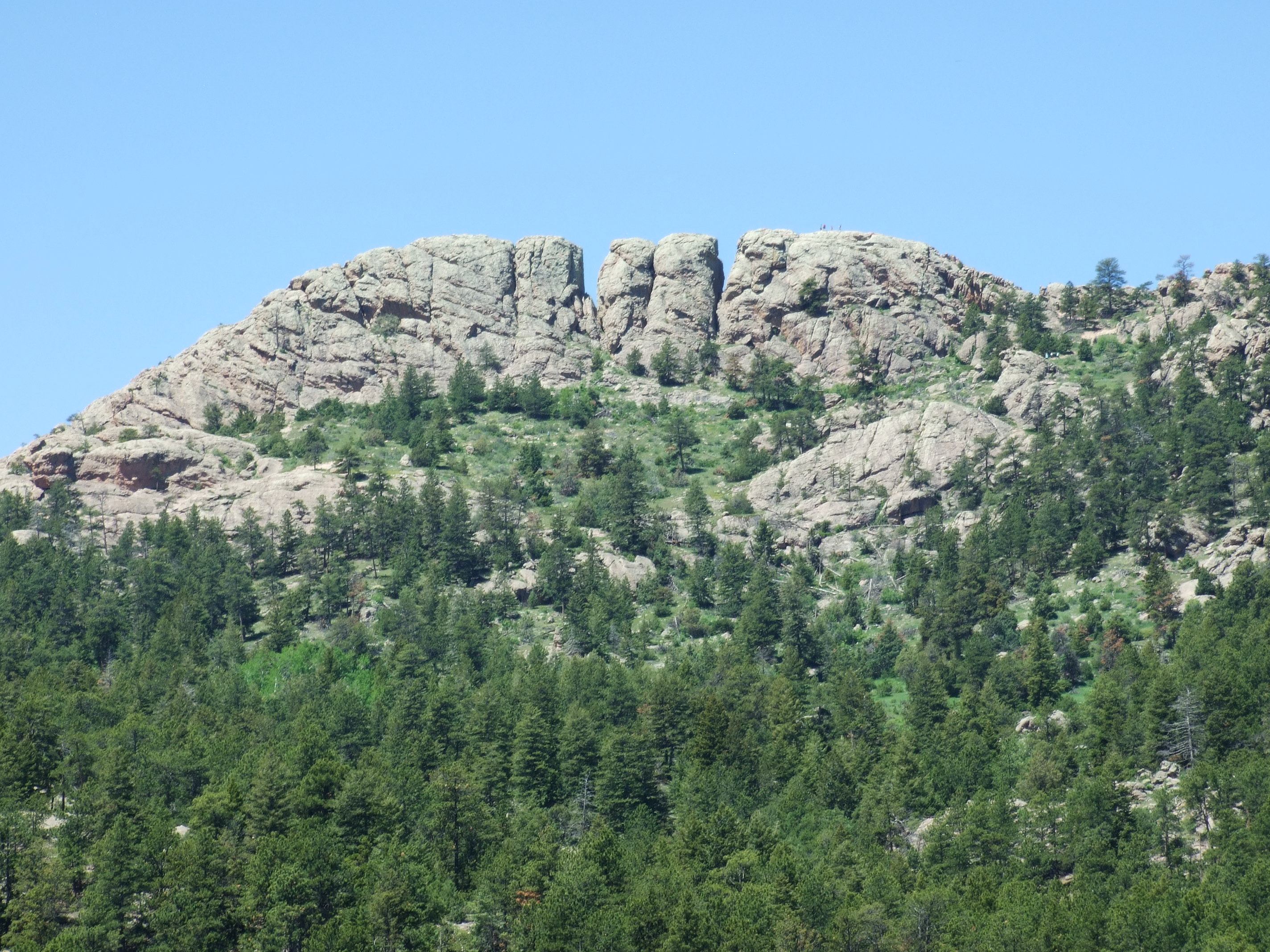
Horsetooth Rock, named for the profile of its east face. Hikers are visible on the summit.

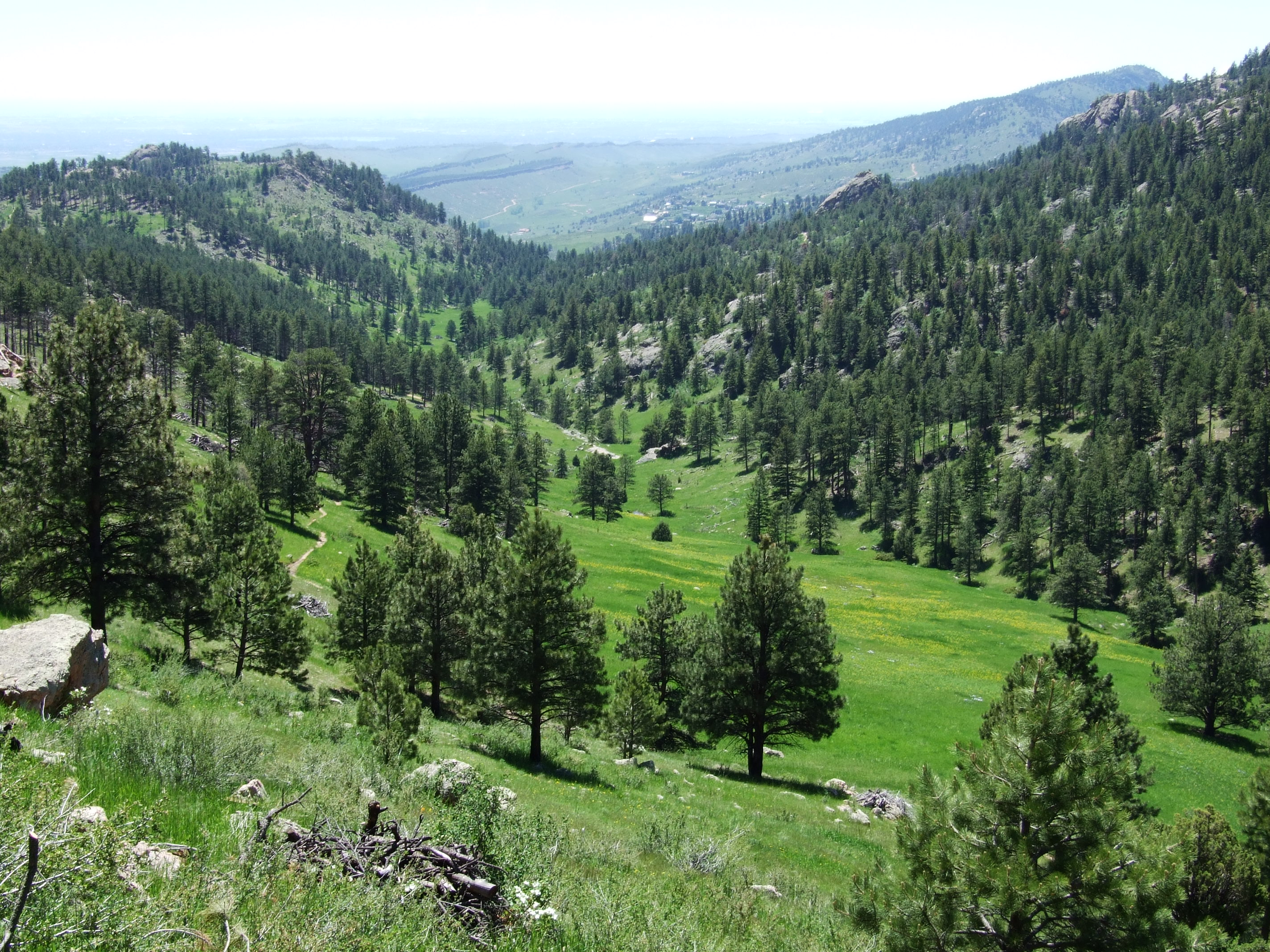
Upper Spring Creek valley on Horsetooth Mountain.

== See also ==
- Horsetooth Reservoir
- List of Colorado mountain ranges
- List of Colorado mountain summits
  - List of Colorado fourteeners
  - List of Colorado 4000 meter prominent summits
  - List of the most prominent summits of Colorado
- List of Colorado county high points
