= North Fork Cache la Poudre River =

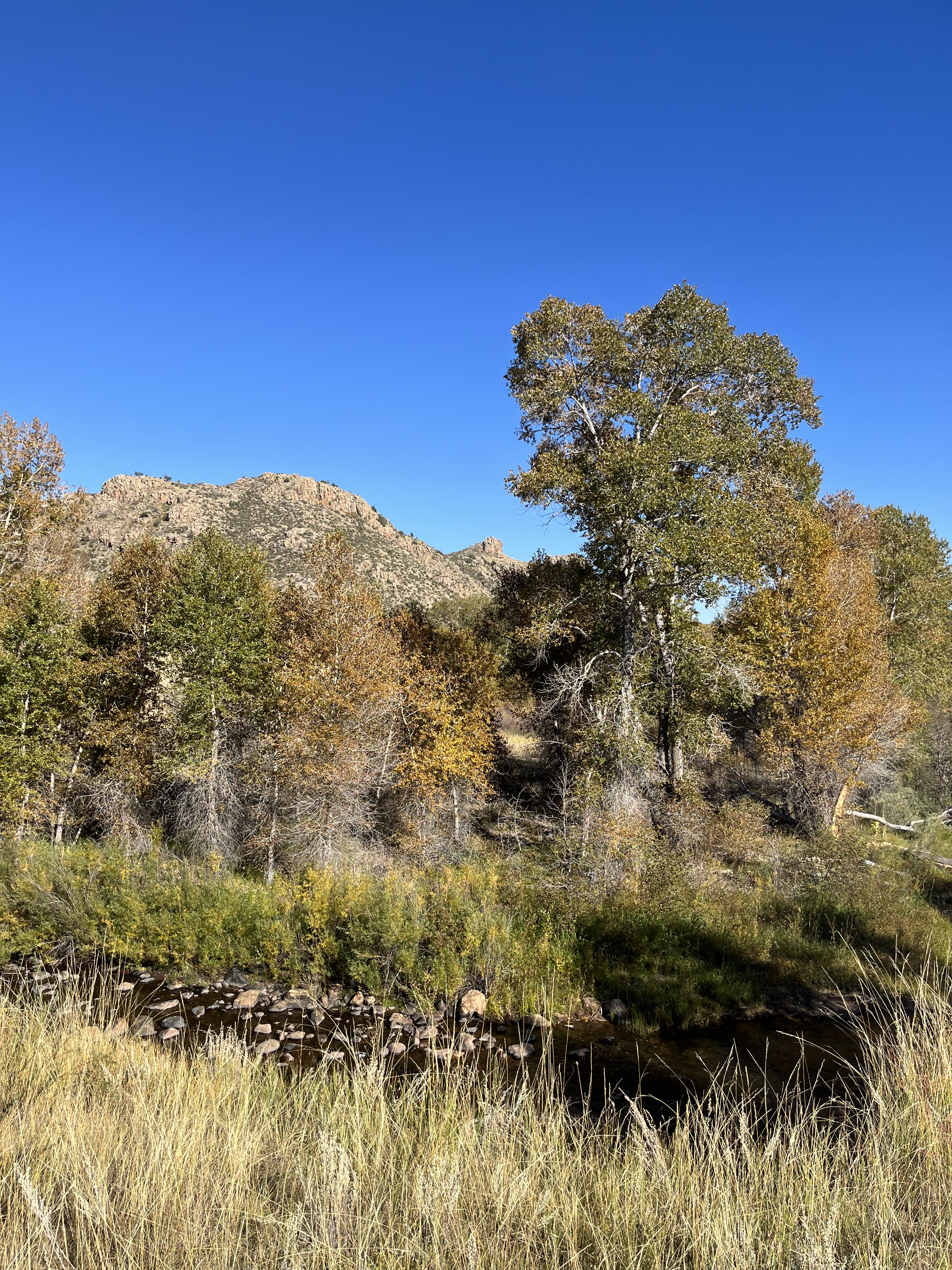
- The North Fork of the Cache La Poudre River near its confluence with Dale Creek in Larimer County, Colorado (September 27th, 2023)

Physical characteristics
- Source
  - location: 40°47′06″N 105°45′12″W
- Mouth
  - location: Confluence with Cache la Poudre
  - coordinates: 40°42′00″N 105°14′36″W
  - elevation: 5,358 ft (1,633 m)
- Length: 59 mi (95 km)

Basin features
- Progression: Cache la Poudre— South Platte—Platte— Missouri—Mississippi

The North Fork Cache la Poudre River (locally called the North Fork) is a tributary of the Cache la Poudre River, approximately 59.2 miles (95.3 km) long, in north central Colorado in the United States. It drains a mountainous area of north central Larimer County northwest of Fort Collins on the western side of the Laramie Foothills.

It rises in remote northwestern Larimer County in the foothills of the Roosevelt National Forest east of the Medicine Bow Range. It flows generally east, passing south of Virginia Dale, where it is impounded by the Halligan Reservoir. It turns roughly south, flowing past Livermore and joining the main branch of the Poudre from the north near the mouth of the Poudre Canyon between Poudre Park and Teds Place. The valley of the North Fork was historically used a trail route between the Colorado Piedmont and the Laramie Plains, including the Cherokee Trail and the Overland Trail. The valley of the North Fork later became the route of the Union Pacific Railroad, and later of U.S. Highway 287 between Fort Collins and Laramie, Wyoming. Communities in the valley of the North Fork include Livermore.

== See also ==
- List of rivers of Colorado
