= Sand Creek =

Sand Creek may refer to a location in the United States:

== Communities ==
- Sand Creek, Guyana, a village in Guyana
- Sand Creek, Michigan, an unincorporated community
- Sand Creek, Oklahoma, in Grant County
- Sand Creek, Wisconsin, a town
  - Sand Creek (community), Wisconsin, an unincorporated community within the town of Sand Creek
- Sand Creek Township (disambiguation)

== Streams ==
- Sand Creek (Denver, Colorado), a tributary of the South Platte River flowing through Aurora, Denver, and Commerce City, Colorado
- Sand Creek (Colorado Springs, Colorado), a tributary of Fountain Creek
- Sand Creek (Wyoming), a tributary of the Laramie River and a National Natural Landmark
- Sand Creek, (San Bernardino County, California), a tributary of Warm Creek, a tributary of Lytle Creek
- Sand Creek (San Diego County, California), a tributary of the San Diego River
- Sand Creek (St. Croix River), in Pine County, eastern Minnesota
- Sand Creek (Minnesota River), in Le Sueur and Scott counties, Minnesota
- Sand Creek (Tebo Creek), a stream in Missouri
- Sand Creek (Wolf Creek), a stream in Missouri
- Sand Creek (Niobrara River tributary), a stream in Holt County, Nebraska
- Sand Creek (Willow Creek tributary), a stream in Rock County, Nebraska
- Big Sandy Creek (Colorado), site of the Sand Creek Massacre
- Big Sandy Creek (Montana), also known as Sand Creek

== Other uses ==
- Sand Creek High School in Colorado Springs, Colorado, USA
- Sand Creek Massacre National Historic Site, Colorado, USA
  - Sand Creek Massacre in southeastern Colorado Territory, USA in 1864
- Sand Creek Natural Area, a protected area in Larimer County, Colorado, USA
