= Sand Creek National Natural Landmark =

National natural landmark site

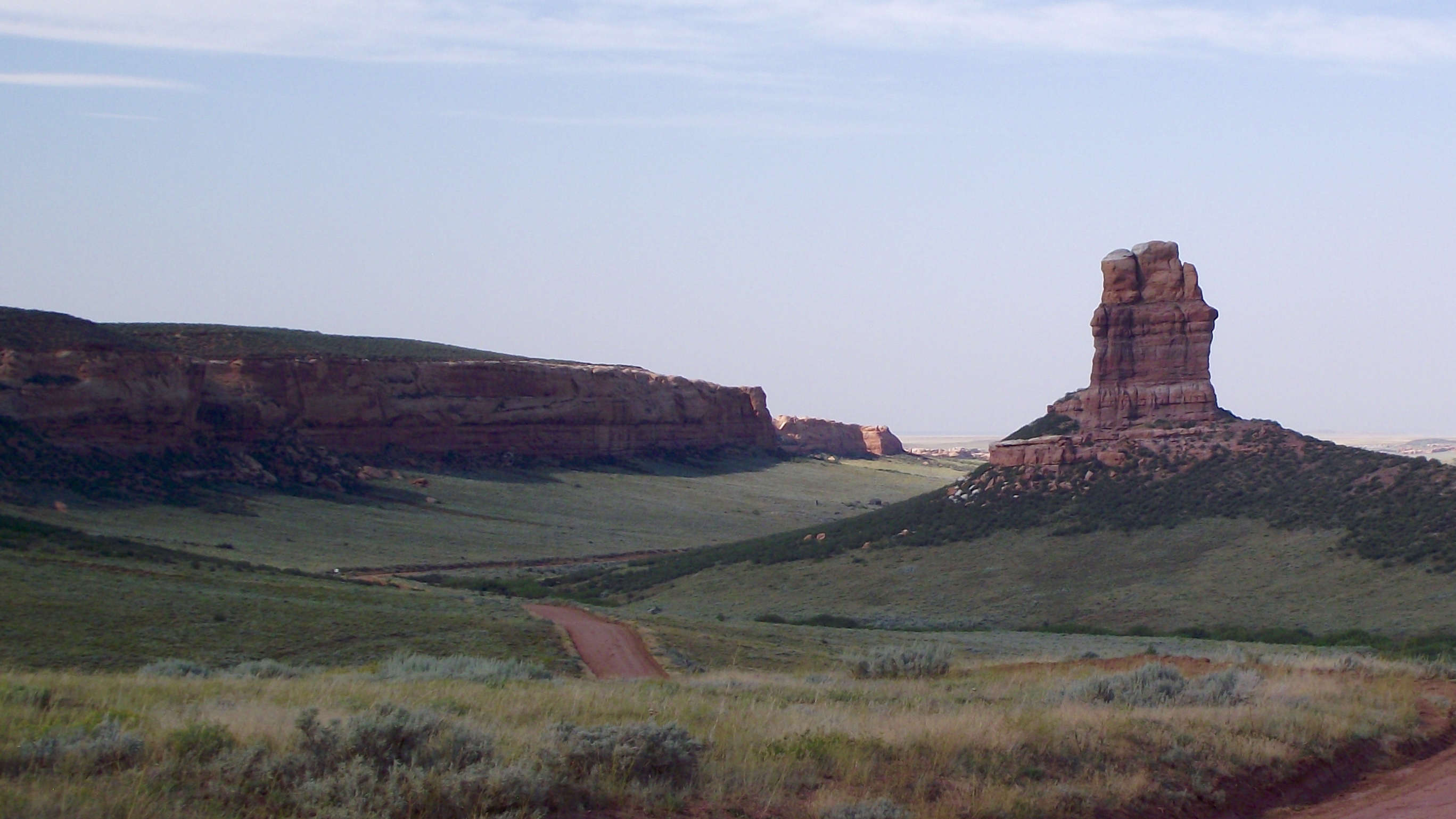
- Sand Creek National Natural Landmark

- Location within Colorado
- Location: Larimer County, Colorado, United States (parts also in Wyoming)
- Nearest city: Livermore and Red Feather Lakes
- Coordinates: 40.995740°N 105.768106°W
- Area: 5,117 acres (20.71 km^{2})
- Established: 1984
- Governing body: Bureau of Land Management

U.S. National Natural Landmark
- Designated: 1984

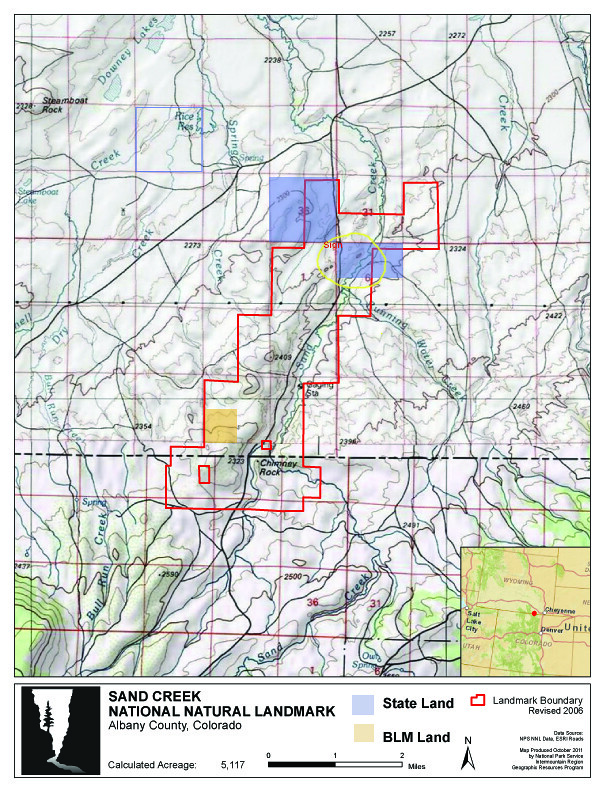
Sand Creek National Natural Landmark map

Sand Creek National Natural Landmark is a 5,117-acre geological National Natural Landmark site on the border of Colorado and Wyoming. The National Natural Landmark was designated in 1984.

Sand Creek National Natural Landmark is noted for its wind and water carved cross-bedded sandstone formations, hoodoos, and toppled blocks. Also its mauve-colored chimneys and towers rocks. The National Natural Landmark is named after Sand Creek (Wyoming). The geological National Natural Landmark resembles southern Utah landscapes, such as Capitol Reef National Park. The Sand Creek National Natural Landmark is on private property, federal and state land. The National Natural Landmark is in both Larimer County, Colorado and Albany County, Wyoming. The Sand Creek National Natural Landmark is governed by the Bureau of Land Management. Camel Rock in Sand Creek National Natural Landmark is a 200-foot sandstone butte in the Landmark. Camel Rock has the semblance of a crouching camel when viewed from the Colorado side, but is commonly called Chimney Rock when viewed from the Wyoming side. North County Road 89, also known as Chimney Rock Road, travels through the Sand Creek National Natural Landmark. it is an unpaved dirt and gravel mountain road, with no winter maintenance and also has seasonal closures.

== See also ==
- Sand Creek Township, Larimer County, Colorado
- List of National Natural Landmarks in Colorado
- List of National Natural Landmarks in Wyoming
