= Sand Creek Township, Larimer County, Colorado =

Unincorporated community in Larimer County, Colorado, United States

Sand Creek Township, Colorado Sand Creek Park
- unincorporated community
- Location of Sand Creek Township, Colorado. Sand Creek Township (Colorado)
- Coordinates: 40.956222°N 105.794139°W
- Country: United States
- State: Colorado
- County: Larimer

Government
  - Type: unincorporated community
  - Body: Larimer County
- Elevation: 8,000 ft (2,400 m)
- Time zone: UTC−07:00 (MST)
  - Summer (DST): UTC−06:00 (MDT)
- ZIP Code: 82070

Sand Creek Township (sometimes call Sand Creek Park) is an unincorporated community-subdivision and U.S. Post Office in Larimer County, Colorado. It is a small community located just south of the Wyoming border. The ZIP Code of the Sand Creek Township Post Office is 82070 (SAND CRK TWP CO 82070). The town is named after Sand Creek (Wyoming) and Sand Creek National Natural Landmark.

== Description ==
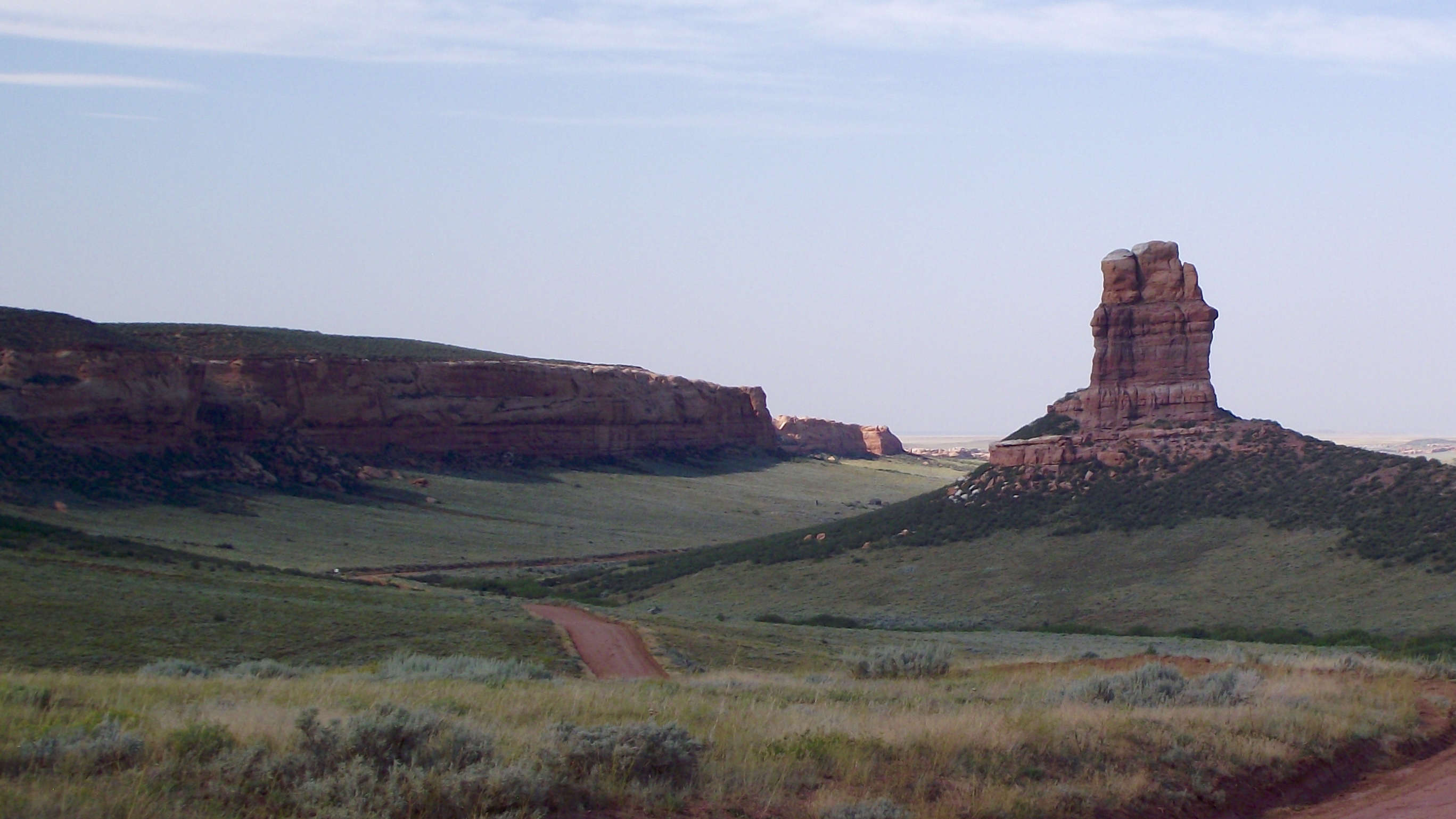
Sand Creek National Natural Landmark

Sand Creek Township/Sand Creek Park overlaps other remote rural subdivisions including Livermore and Red Feather Lakes. These rural subdivisions have large mountain lots with rugged terrain. Nearby is the Sand Creek National Natural Landmark with cross-bedded sandstone in the Laramie Mountains. Sand Creek Township is on the foothills of the southern slopes of the Laramie Mountains, near Roosevelt National Forest and Bull Mountain. Sand Creek flows north toward the Laramie River in Wyoming. Sand Creek Township has mountain meadows with some lodgepole pine Sand Creek Pass, Sand Creek Pass Road, is located at the southern edge of the Sand Creek Township. The Sand Creek Pass is an unpaved road, 8 miles road, that crosses the Laramie River Valley toward the east, with Bull Mountain to the north. Sand Creek National Natural Landmark is in both Colorado and Wyoming. Sand Creek National Natural Landmark was designated a National Natural Landmark in 1984, with 5,118 acres of private, Federal, and State land.

== See also ==
- Fort Collins, CO Metropolitan Statistical Area
- Front Range Urban Corridor
