= Red Feather Lakes Community Library =

- Location: 71 Firehouse Lane; Red Feather Lakes, CO, United States
- Established: 1969
- Branches: 1

Other information
- Website: redfeather.colibraries.org

The Red Feather Lakes Community Library is the only branch of the Red Feather Mountain Library District in Larimer County, Colorado.

The District includes Red Feather Lakes, Crystal Lakes, Glacier View Meadows, Green Mountain Meadows, Hewlett Gulch, Deer Meadows, Boy Scout Road, and the Upper Poudre Canyon. The Library participates in the Colorado Library Collaborate program.

== History ==
The Library was established in 1969 by the local women's group with $240 from the Larimer County Commissioners and 250 donated books on shelves from an abandoned store. The original library was located on the basement level of the Red Feather Lakes Property Owner's Association Building. The current location and building was built in 1987 with community donations of land, labor, money and support.

The District was approved by voters with a 2.5 mill levy in November 2000 with funds arriving in January 2001. It is currently one of the smallest library districts in Colorado, covering just 37 square miles (96 km^{2}). It was based on the three existing volunteer fire department districts; Red Feather Lakes, Crystal Lakes, and Glacier View Meadows.

A new addition to the library was dedicated in August 2005. It includes a children's area, community meeting room and art gallery. The expansion nearly doubled the building size to 3,163 square feet (293.9 m^{2}).
