= BWO =

BWO can refer to:

- BW Offshore, an FPSO owner and operator
- BWO (band), a Swedish pop group formerly known as Bodies Without Organs
- Body without organs, a sociological concept developed by Gilles Deleuze and Félix Guattari
- Backward wave oscillator
- The Blue World Order, a stable of professional wrestlers
- BWO, Blue-winged Olive mayflies used in fly fishing
- Bricket Wood railway station, Hertfordshire, England (by National Rail station code
