= Sand Creek Township, Indiana =

Sand Creek Township, Indiana may refer to one of the following places:

- Sand Creek Township, Bartholomew County, Indiana
- Sand Creek Township, Decatur County, Indiana
- Sand Creek Township, Jennings County, Indiana

See also

- Sand Creek Township (disambiguation)
- Salt Creek Township, Indiana (disambiguation)
