= Poudre Park, Colorado =

Unincorporated community in Larimer County, CO, USA

- Unincorporated community
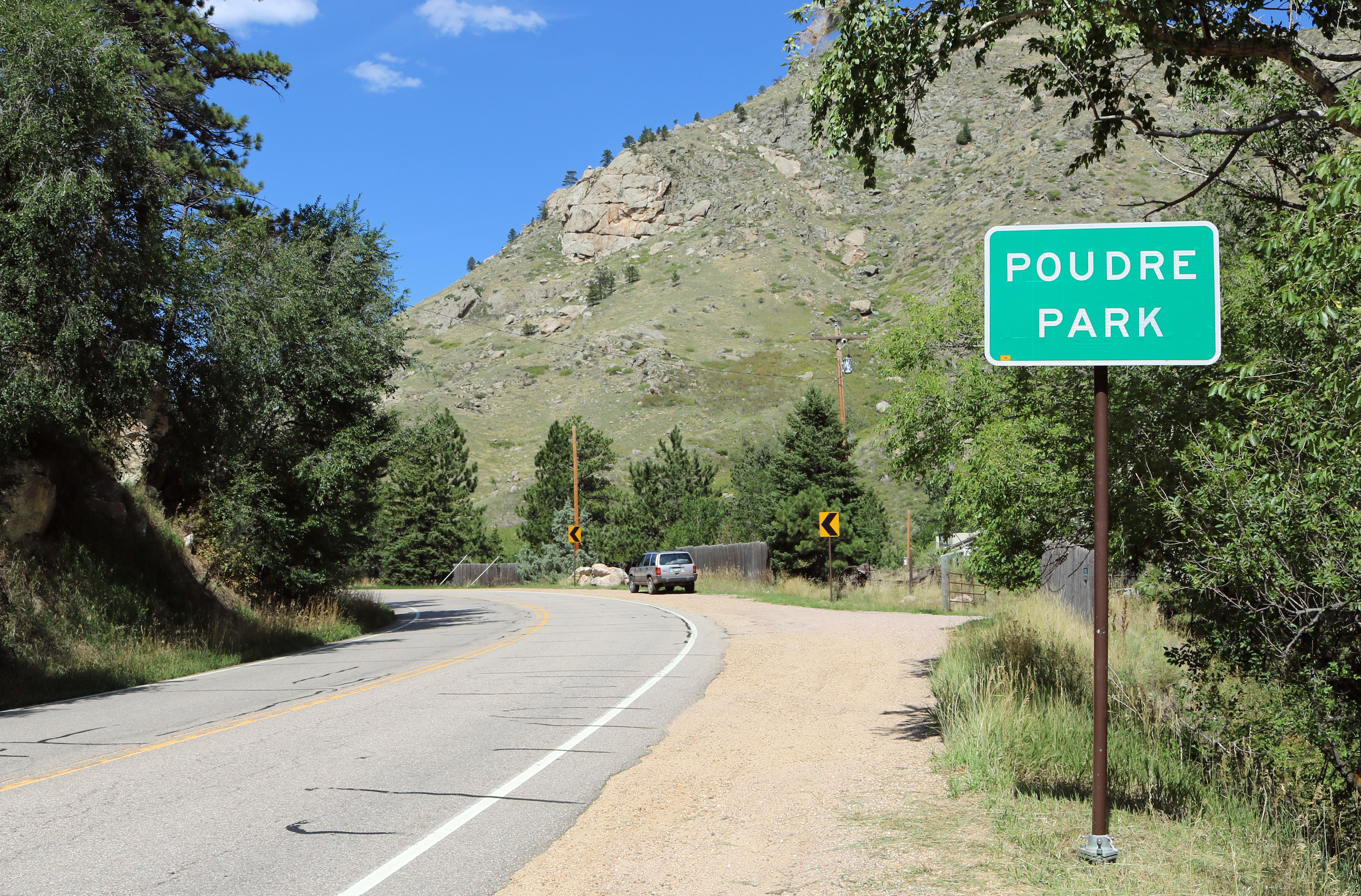
- East side of Poudre Park, looking west

- Location within Colorado Location within the United States
- Coordinates: 40°41′9.96″N 105°18′16.92″W
- Country: United States
- State: Colorado
- County: Larimer
- Elevation: 5,676 ft (1,730 m)
- Time zone: UTC-7 (Mountain (MST))
  - Summer (DST): UTC-6 (MDT)
- Area code: 970
- GNIS feature ID: 204671

Poudre Park is an unincorporated community in Larimer County, Colorado. It is located near Poudre Canyon and is west of Ted's Place along State Highway 14. It is the location of the Poudre Canyon Fire Protection District station #1, as well as the Poudre Christian Fellowship church.
