= Kinikinik, Colorado =

Unincorporated community in Larimer County, CO, USA

- Unincorporated community
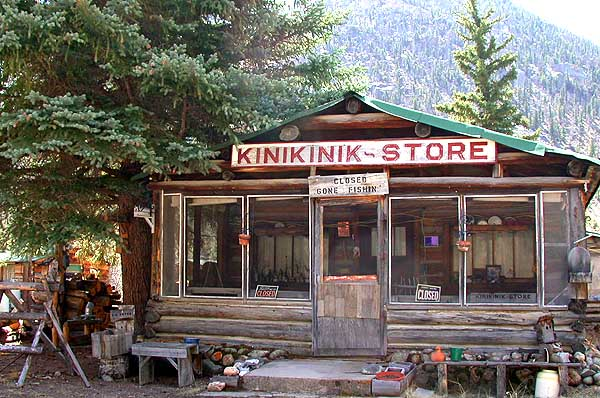
- General store in Kinikinik

- Location within Colorado Location within the United States
- Coordinates: 40°42′45″N 105°44′17″W
- Country: United States
- State: Colorado
- County: Larimer
- Elevation: 7,730 ft (2,360 m)
- Time zone: UTC-7 (Mountain (MST))
  - Summer (DST): UTC-6 (MDT)
- Area code: 970
- GNIS feature ID: 177109

Kinikinik is a small unincorporated community in western Larimer County, Colorado, in the United States. It is located along State Highway 14 in the upper Poudre Canyon west of Rustic on the east side of Cameron Pass. The community consists of a former general store and neighboring summer mountain resorts and vacation homes. The activities include fishing in the Cache la Poudre River and hiking in the nearby mountains in the Roosevelt National Forest. The community was named for the kinnikinick plant by early settlers.

Kinikinik is also one of the longest palindromic places in the US, and in the world.
