= Willow Creek (Niobrara River tributary) =

Stream in Nebraska, U.S.

Willow Creek Tributary to Niobrara River
- Location of Willow Creek mouth Willow Creek (Niobrara River tributary) (the United States)

Location
- Country: United States
- State: Nebraska
- County: Rock

Physical characteristics
- Source: North Fork Elkhorn River divide
  - location: about Willowdale School
  - coordinates: 42°40′46.00″N 099°23′20.39″W
  - elevation: 2,215 ft (675 m)
- Mouth: Niobrara River
  - location: about 0.5 miles northwest of Mariaville, Nebraska
  - coordinates: 42°46′44.00″N 099°21′34.38″W
  - elevation: 1,808 ft (551 m)
- Length: 9.73 mi (15.66 km)
- Basin size: 21.63 square miles (56.0 km^{2})
- Discharge
  - location: Niobrara River
  - average: 2.56 cu ft/s (0.072 m^{3}/s) at mouth with Niobrara River

Basin features
- Progression: Niobrara River → Missouri River → Mississippi
- River system: Niobrara
- Tributaries
  - right: Sand Creek
- Bridges: 887th Road, 888th Road, Atwood Road, Antelope Road

Willow Creek is a 9.73 mi (15.66 km) long third-order tributary to the Niobrara River in Rock County, Nebraska.

Willow Creek rises on the North Fork Elkhorn River divide at Willowdale School and then flows northwest and northeast to join the Niobrara River about 0.5 miles (0.80 km) northwest of Mariaville, Nebraska.

== Watershed ==
Willow Creek drains 21.63 square miles (56.0 km^{2}) of area, receives about 24.2 in/year (61 cm/year) of precipitation, and is about 3.53% forested.

== See also ==
- List of rivers of Nebraska
