= Salt Creek Township, Indiana =

Salt Creek Township, Indiana may refer to one of the following places:

- Salt Creek Township, Decatur County, Indiana
- Salt Creek Township, Franklin County, Indiana
- Salt Creek Township, Jackson County, Indiana
- Salt Creek Township, Monroe County, Indiana

See also

- Salt Creek Township (disambiguation)
- Sand Creek Township, Indiana (disambiguation)
