= Red Feather Lakes, Colorado =

Census-designated place in Larimer County, CO, USA

Red Feather Lakes
- Census-designated place
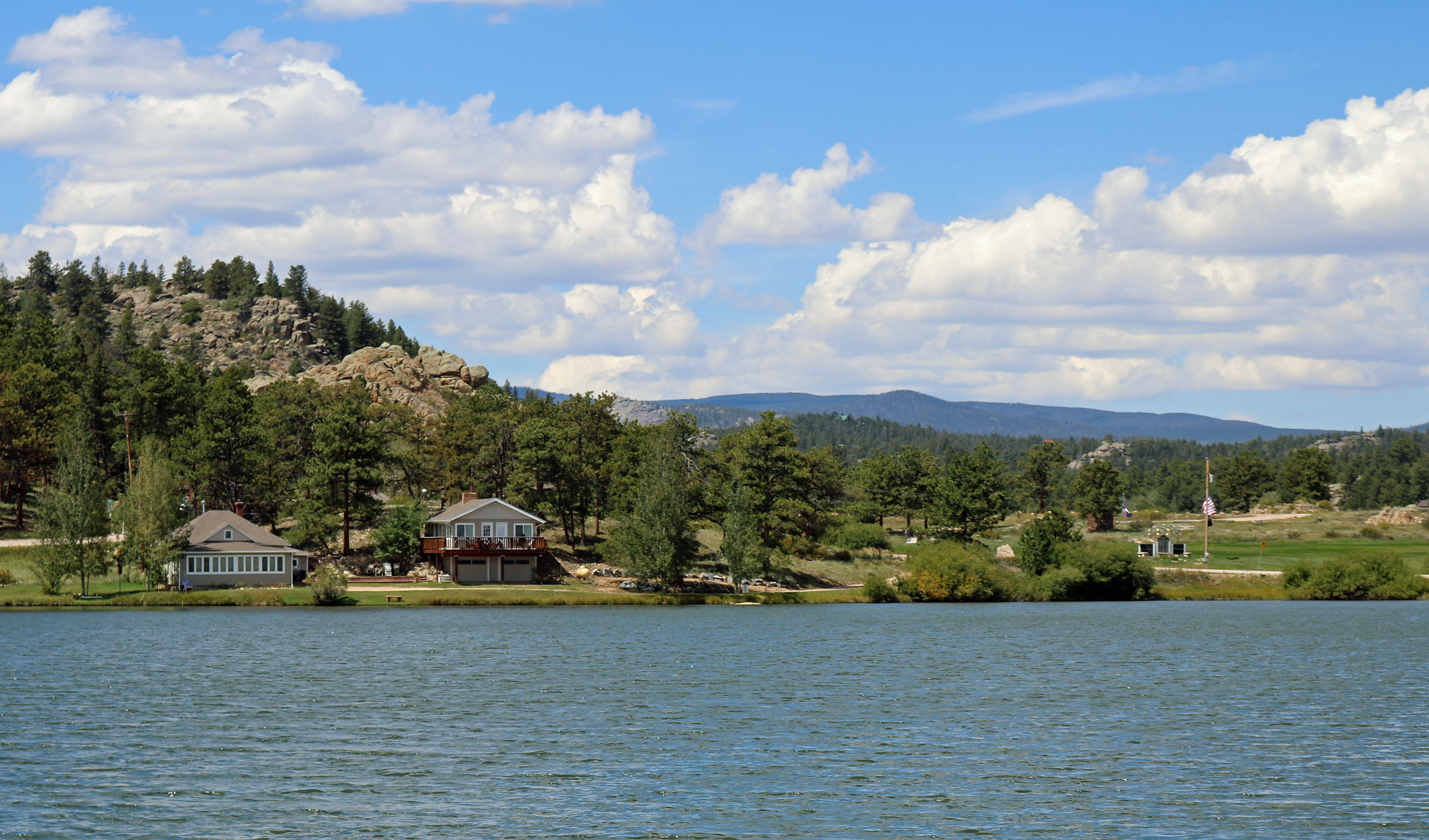
- Ramona Lake, with the community park on the right.

- Location of the Red Feather Lakes CDP in Larimer County, Colorado
- Coordinates: 40°48′34″N 105°36′43″W
- Country: United States
- State: Colorado
- County: Larimer County

Government
  - Type: Unincorporated area

Area
  - Total: 9.648 sq mi (24.988 km^{2})
  - Land: 9.116 sq mi (23.610 km^{2})
  - Water: 0.532 sq mi (1.378 km^{2})
- Elevation: 8,245 ft (2,513 m)

Population (2020)
  - Total: 426
  - Density: 46.7/sq mi (18.0/km^{2})
- Time zone: UTC-7 (MST)
  - Summer (DST): UTC-6 (MDT)
- ZIP Code: 80545
- Area code: 970
- GNIS feature ID: 2409149

Red Feather Lakes is an unincorporated town, a post office, and a census-designated place (CDP) located in and governed by Larimer County, Colorado, United States. The CDP is a part of the Fort Collins, CO Metropolitan Statistical Area. The Red Feather Lakes post office has the ZIP Code 80545. At the United States Census 2020, the population of the Red Feather Lakes CDP was 426.

Located in the Rocky Mountains northwest of Fort Collins, Red Feather Lakes is a rustic mountain village surrounded by the Roosevelt National Forest. The village has three small general stores with gas pump, groceries, ATM and gift shop, a hardware store, an outdoor sports shop, a coffee shop, a community library, small antique store, and post office. Several rustic mountain restaurants are located in the community.

Gnome Road (aka "Elf Lane") is a mountain dirt road in the village. Hikers strolling and cars cruising the scenic road will find ceramic elves and gnomes as well as fairy doors and faces among the trees, boulders and bushes.

== History ==
Other than Native Americans, only occasional hunters and trappers passed through the Red Feather Lakes area until the middle of the 19th century. The first known settler was John Hardin, who built a cabin about 2 miles (3 km) from the current Red Feather Lakes village in 1871. Other settlers, many of them families of Hardin's eleven surviving children, homesteaded and built nearby. In these early years, the settlers were primarily ranchers, but another important activity was lumbering. The trails in the area, some of which eventually became roads, were built by tie hacks, who hauled their railroad ties down to what is now Tie Siding, Wyoming, where they were used in building the transcontinental railroad.

The first government survey, in 1879, showed only one lake in the region: what is now Creedmore Lake, several miles to the north of the present community. As the area developed, networks of toll roads, lakes and water ditches appeared. By the beginning of the twentieth century, water rights had become a major issue in the region, and who had ownership of the water in the various streams, man-made lakes, and diversions continued to spark legal battles until a Supreme Court decision in 1921 awarded a major portion of water being diverted from the Laramie River tributaries to competing claims in Wyoming.

In September 1886, gold was discovered a few miles south, and the town of Manhattan was platted at the site in 1887. Manhattan grew to a peak of 300 inhabitants in 1898, but substantial gold was never obtained, and it became a ghost town a few years later.

By 1895, the population was sufficient that a school district was established and a schoolhouse constructed. Timbering and sawmills grew in importance in the area, and in 1902, a National Forest Reserve (later to become part of Roosevelt National Forest) was established, principally to exercise some control over the helter-skelter timbering.

Recreation was not of much importance in the early years and first appeared when the Fort Collins YMCA built a camp in 1919. Interest in the area as a summer retreat for urban dwellers in Fort Collins and other Front Range communities grew rapidly, and in 1923, the name "Red Feather" made its first appearance when the Red Feather Mountain Lakes Association was formed with the objective of developing recreational homes (cabins) on 4,320 acres (6.75 sq mi; 17.5 km^{2}). The name was stimulated by Princess Tsianina Redfeather Blackstone, a Native American girl who was touring in concert with the composer Charles Wakefield Cadman. Purportedly, the namesake was Princess Redfeather's grandfather, Chief Redfeather, whose grave was supposed to be in the area.

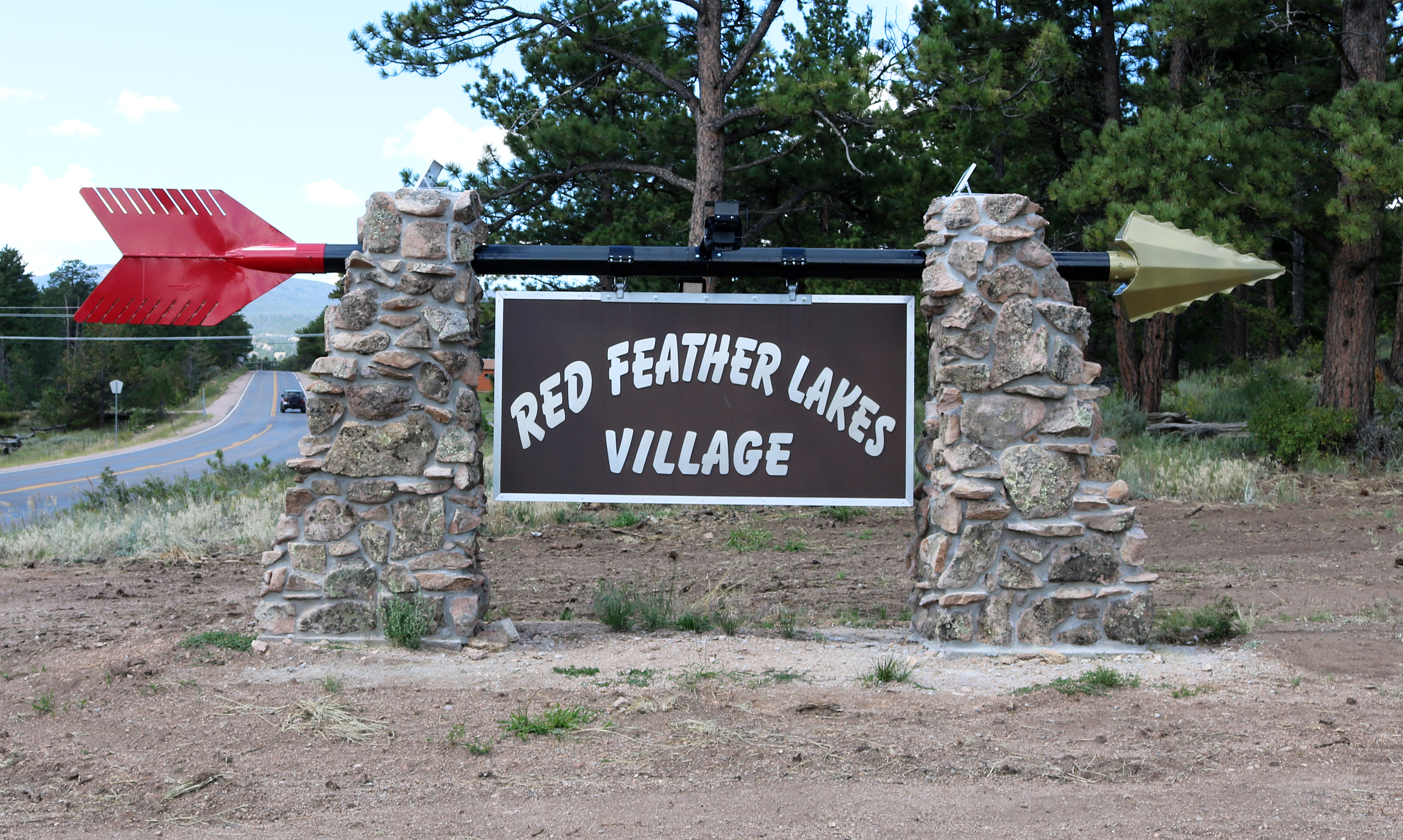
A sign pointing to Red Feather Lakes Village

The Red Feather Mountain Lakes Association (whose assets were acquired by the Red Feather Investment Co. five years later) had grand plans. The planning map included a golf course, tennis courts, rodeo grounds, a ranch school, a rifle range, and many other recreational facilities. Of these, only a nine-hole golf course materialized. Several hotels were planned; one was built in 1924. A silver fox farm was also part of the plan, and this was begun early in the development with twenty pairs of foxes bought in New York. Though it did not succeed at the scale the developers envisioned, this development was responsible for the growth of Red Feather Lakes as a fishing and summer recreational area. In 1925, the investors claimed the sale of 1,900 lots and orders for 100 cabins. Most of these lots were one-eighth acre in size, which sufficed for a cabin and the requisite outhouse. Growth was slow and was impeded by the Great Depression and by World War II. Many of the original lots survive today, and original cabins can be found if one looks carefully behind and beneath various modern additions.

In 1933, President Roosevelt established the Civilian Conservation Corps (CCC). Several CCC camps operated in the region, including one on the site of the Manhattan ghost town and, starting in 1935, one not far from the village. Young men working in the camps improved roads, cleared forests, engaged in firefighting, and constructed the original fire tower at the top of Deadman Mountain. During World War II, as the CCC was phased out, the camp near the village was sold as salvage, and another became a POW camp.

The silver fox farm continued into the 1950s, by which time furs were in little demand. The property was sold around 1960 and is now a part of the Fox Acres Community (Golf Club and residences). The original fox farm caretaker's house, with its second-story cupola that overlooked the fox pens, is still in use on the property.

The Rural Electrification Administration (REA) brought electricity to the Red Feather Lakes area in 1952. In the ensuing years, new buildings gradually changed the face of the village, including a fire station and library.

Detailed historical information is gathered and maintained by the Red Feather Historical Society. The group maintains a website and operates a museum in a historical cabin in the village.

== Geography ==
Red Feather Lakes is located in north-central Larimer County. Via Red Feather Lakes Road, it is 24 miles (39 km) west of U.S. Route 287 at Livermore and 45 miles (72 km) northwest of Fort Collins, the county seat.

Red Feather Lakes situated almost entirely within Roosevelt National Forest, and connects via CR 68c to the Poudre Canyon Scenic Byway, Colorado Hwy 14 and Arapahoe National Forest.

There are at least 12 named lakes in the community, including Parvin Lake, Dowdy Lake, West Lake, Snake Lake, Letitia Lake, Red Feather Lake, Lake Ramona, Hiawatha Lake, Apache Lake, Shagwa Lake, Lake Nokomis, and Lake Erie. All of the lakes in the CDP eventually drain to Lone Pine Creek, an east-flowing tributary of the Cache la Poudre River, part of the South Platte River watershed.

The Red Feather Lakes CDP has an area of 6,175 acres (24.988 km^{2}), including 341 acres (1.378 km^{2}) of water.

== Demographics ==
The United States Census Bureau initially defined the Red Feather Lakes CDP for the United States Census 2000.

Red Feather Lakes CDP, Colorado
Year	Pop.	±%
2000	525	—
2010	343	−34.7%
2020	426	+24.2%
Source: United States Census Bureau

== See also ==
- List of statistical areas in Colorado
- Front Range Urban Corridor
- North Central Colorado Urban Area
- Fort Collins-Loveland, CO Metropolitan Statistical Area
- Red Feather Lakes Community Library
- Roosevelt National Forest
- Drala Mountain Center
- Great Stupa of Dharmakaya
