= Sand Creek (Wolf Creek tributary) =

Stream in the US state of Missouri

Coordinates: 37.774218°N 90.373455°W

Sand Creek is a stream in St. Francois County in the U.S. state of Missouri. It is a tributary of Wolf Creek.

Sand Creek was so named on account of sandstone deposits in the area.

== See also ==
- List of rivers of Missouri
