= Blue-winged Olive flies =

Type of fly fishing lure

- Artificial fly
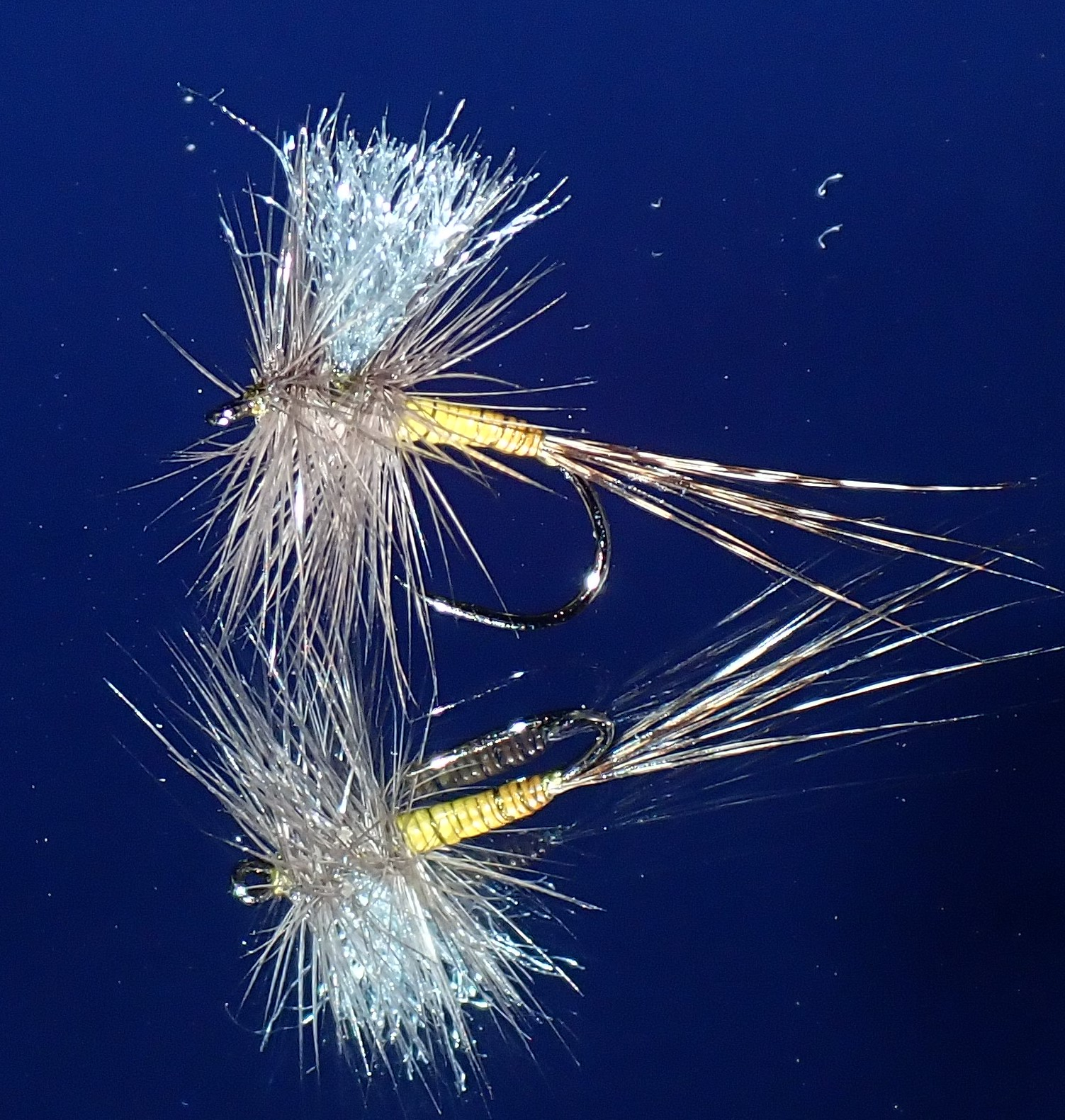
- Blue-winged Olive Quill
- Type: Dry fly, Nymph, Emerger
- Imitates: Mayflies

Materials
- Typical sizes: 12-22 standard dry fly, nymph

Uses
- Primary use: Trout

Blue-winged Olive flies is a collective term used by anglers in fly fishing to identify a broad array of mayflies having olive, olive-brown bodies and bluish wings in their adult form. Sometimes referred to as BWO, a wide array of artificial flies are tied to imitate adult, nymphal and emerging stages of the aquatic insect. While the family Baetidae probably has the most species identified as blue-winged olives, another mayfly family Ephemerellidae also contains some. Collectively, blue-winged olive mayflies are an important food source in most trout streams, thus their widespread imitation by fly tiers.

== History ==
The first mention of Blue-winged Olive as common name may be in Frederick Halford's Dry Fly Entomology (1897). Halford's Blue-winged Olives were identified as members of the genus Ephemerella. Both Alfred Ronald's Fly-Fisher's Entomology (1837) and Mary Orvis Marbury's Favorite Flies and Their Histories (1892) do not refer to any flies as Blue-winged Olives. There is ample evidence in fly fishing literature that what are now called Blue-winged Olives were once called Olive Duns, Blue Duns, Iron-blue Duns, Olive Quills, etc.

== General description ==
Swisher and Richards' Selective Trout (1971) gives the following description:

For the fly-fisherman, it will be much more practical to cover the numerous Blue-wing Olives as one group. In general this group can be divided into two fairly distinct color types. This holds true not only for duns but also for nymphs and spinners. Most duns fall into either the light-gray wing--olive body or medium gray-olive brown body classification. Nymphs are generally brown or olive brown, while spinners are medium or dark brown.

— Doug Swisher and Carl Richards

== List of Blue-winged Olive patterns ==
=== Adult patterns ===
==== Duns ====
As described in Flies for Trout (Stewart and Allen, 1993):
- Classic Blue Dun
- Blue Quill
- Blue Wing Olive
- Blue Wing Olive, Loop Para Dun

As described in A.K.'s Fly Box, A.K. Best (1996)

- Olive Quill Dun
- Olive Quill Dun Parachute

As described in Trout Country Flies (Staples, 2002):

- Donnelly Blue Dun
- Sparkle Dun
Blue-Winged Olive Duns
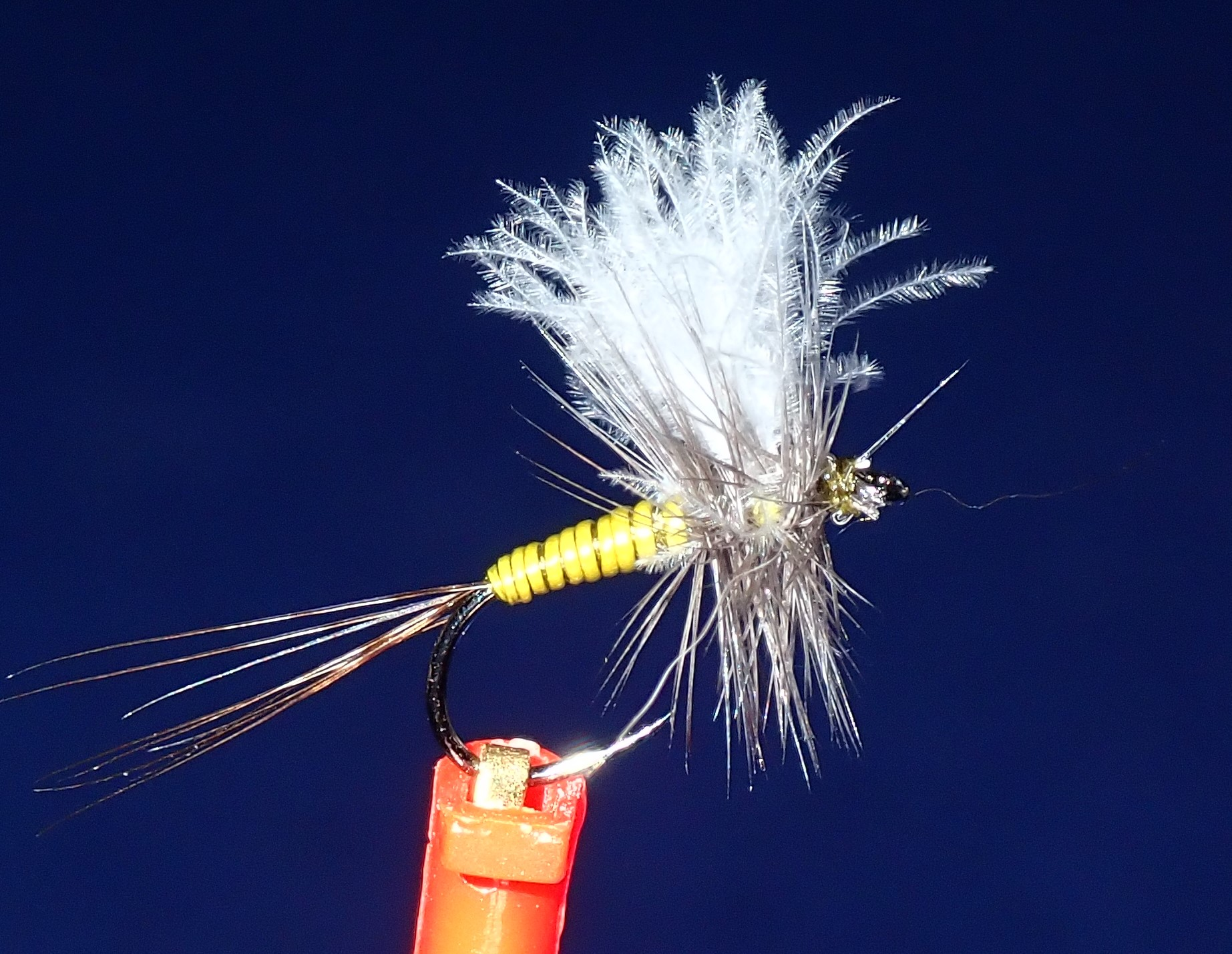
BWO CDC Winged Olive Biot

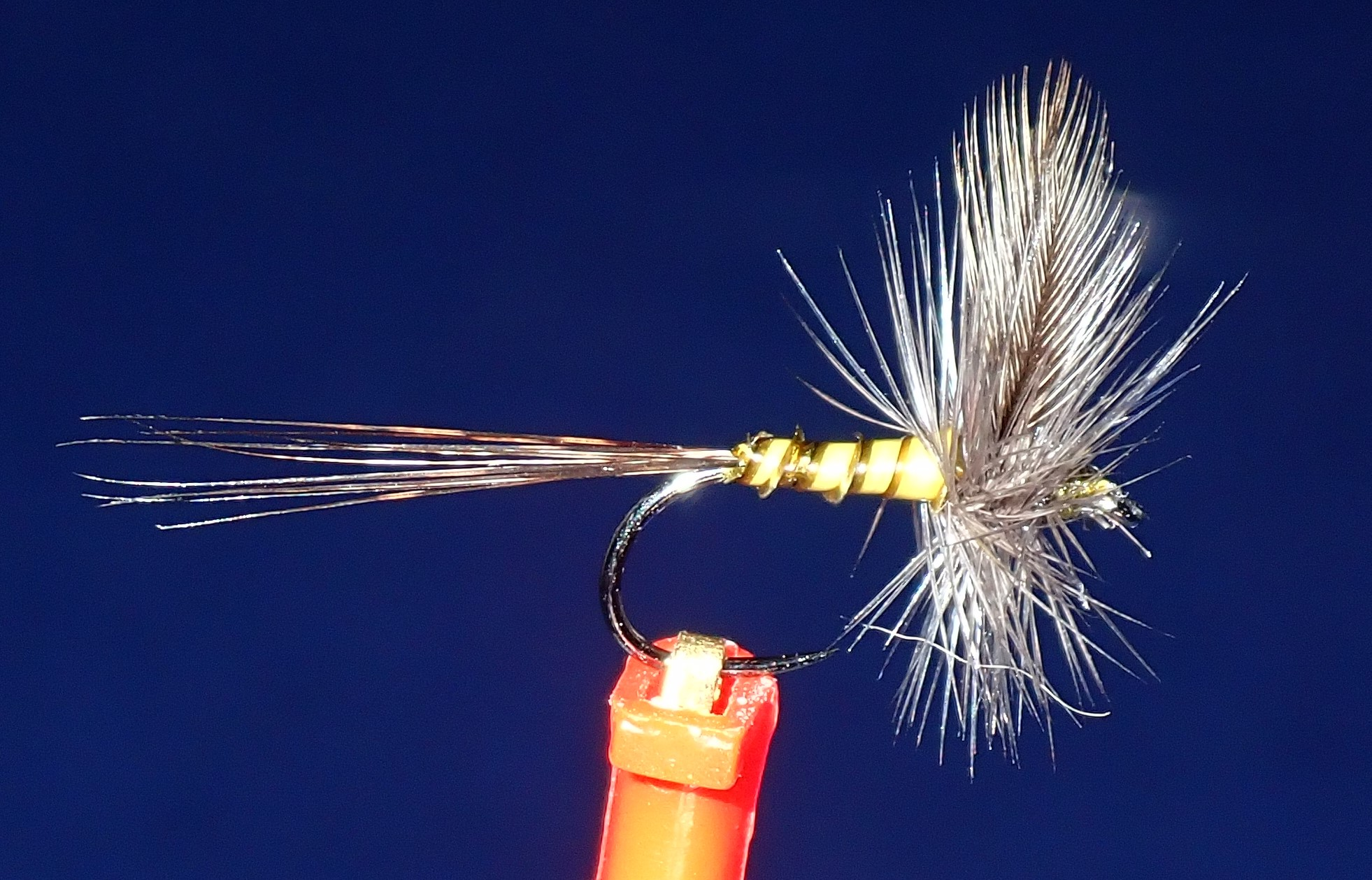
BWO Hen Winged Olive Biot

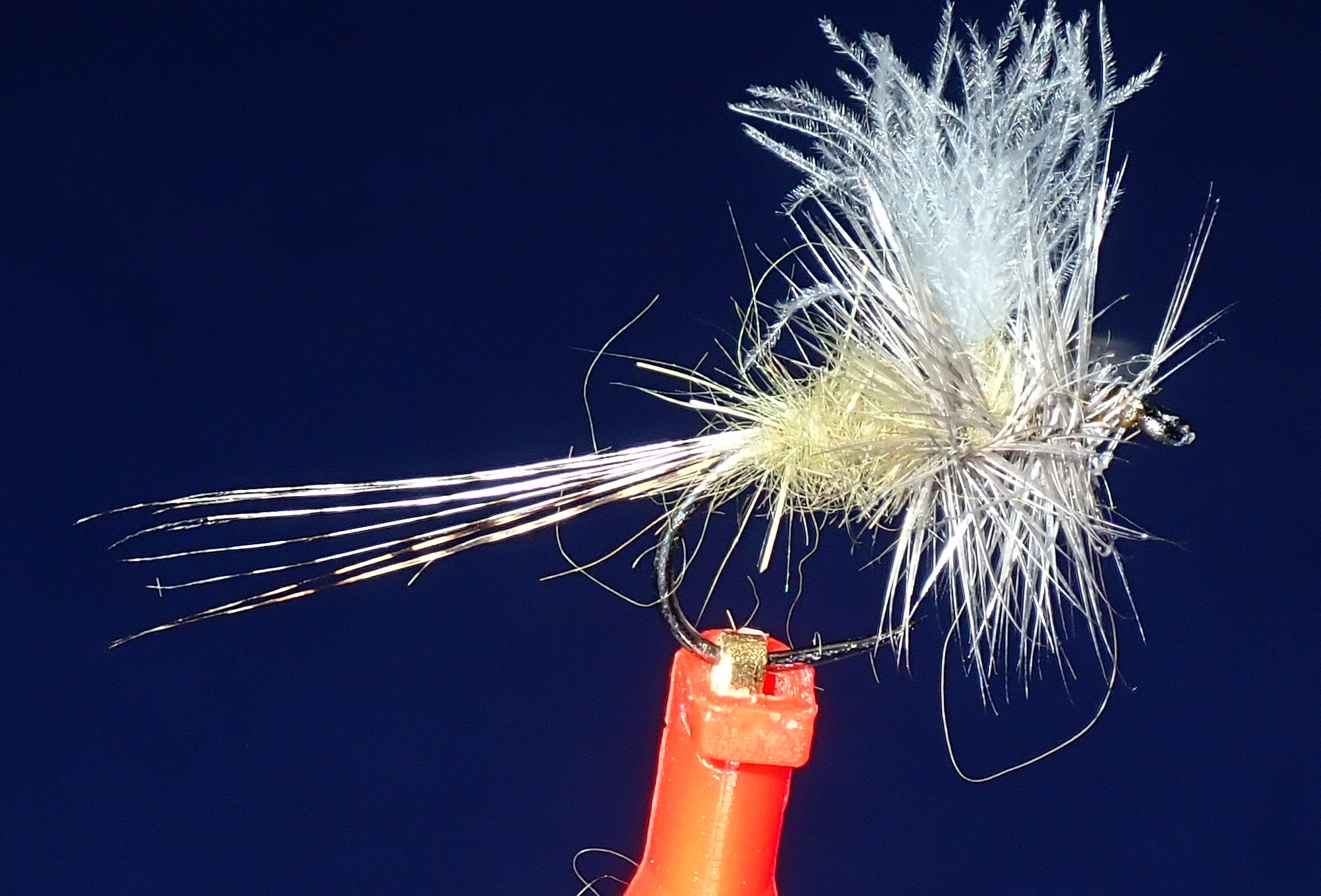
BWO Olive Fur CDC Wing

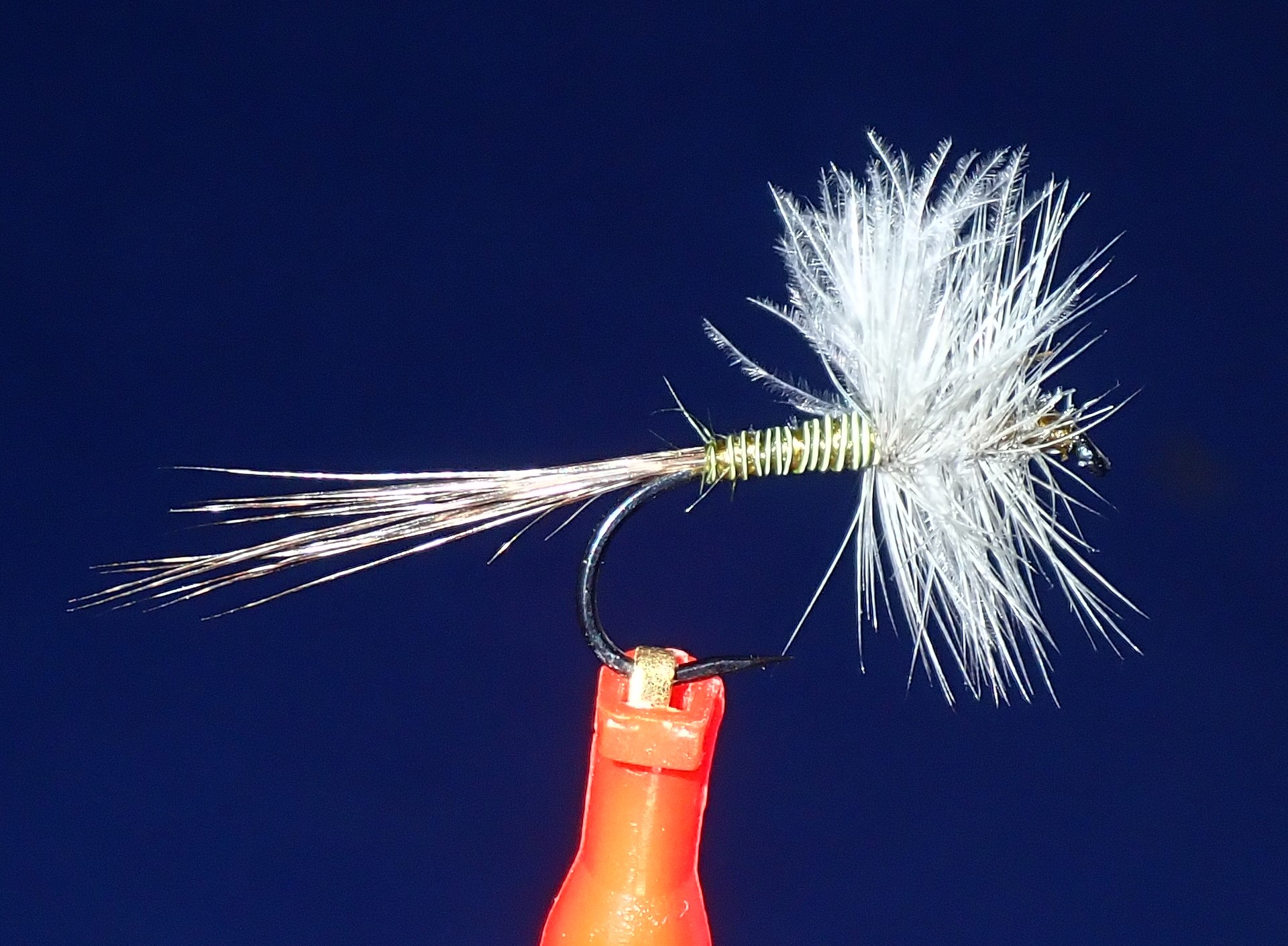
BWO Olive Quill CDC Wing

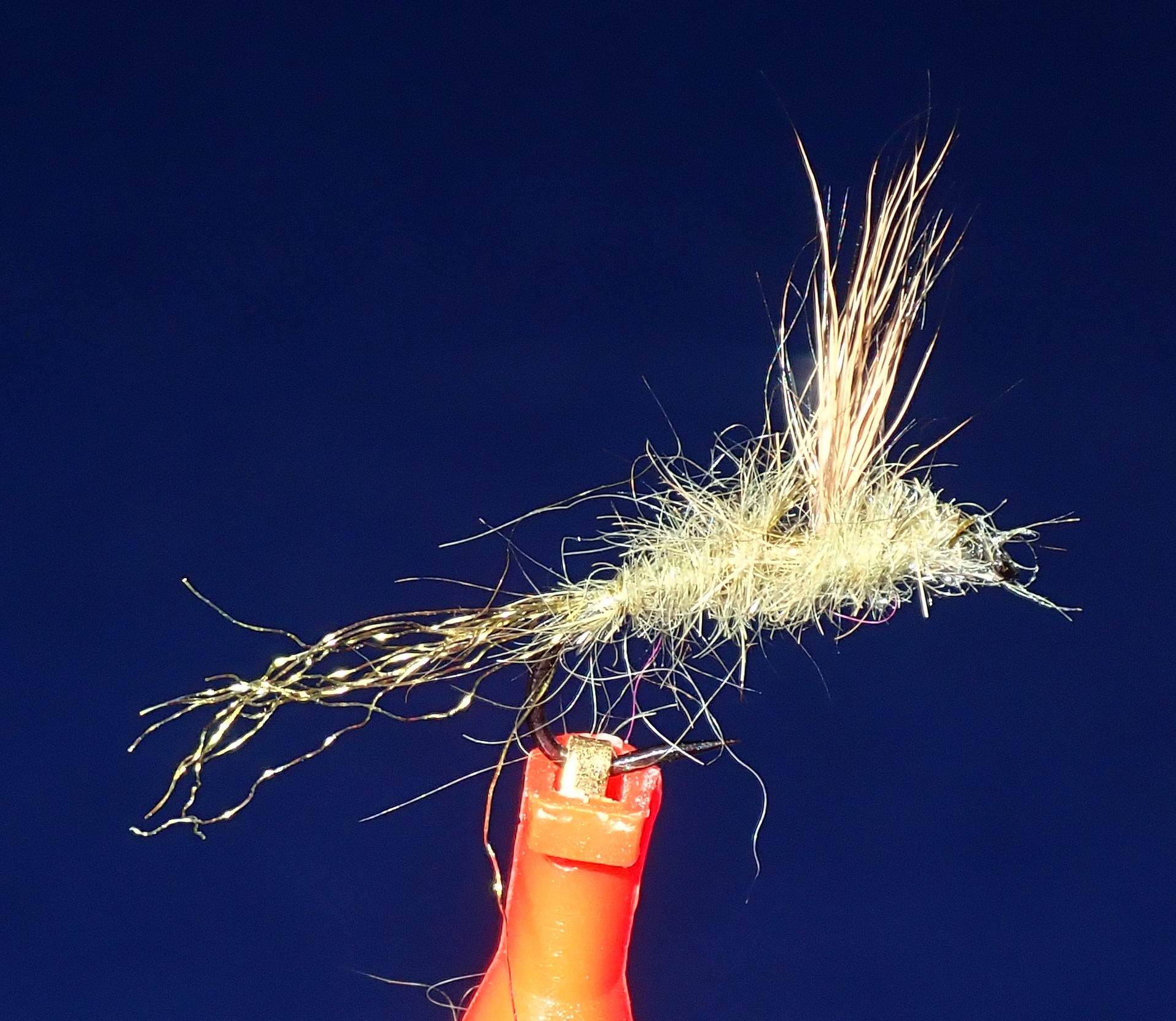
BWO Olive Sparkle Dun

==== Spinners ====
As described in Flies for Trout:
- Blue Wing Olive Crystal Wing Spinner
- Clear Wing Spinner, Brown

As described in A.K.'s Fly Box, A.K. Best (1996)

- NQ Quill Spinner
- Red Quill Spinner
- Light Olive Quill Spinner

As described in Trout Country Flies (2002), Bruce Staples

- Flatwing Spinner
- Hen Spinner

=== Nymph patterns ===
As described in Flies for Trout:

- Gold Ribbed Hare's Ear
- Baetis nymph
- Pheasant Tail nymph

As described in Trout Country Flies (2002), Bruce Staples

- Sparkle Pheasant Tail Nymph

=== Emerger patterns ===
As described in Flies for Trout:

- Captive Dun
- Compara Emerger
- Loop Wing Emerger Olive
