= Colorado State University Mountain Campus =

Satellite campus of Colorado State University

- Type: Satellite campus of Colorado State University
- Established: 1910
- Director: Seth Webb
- Location: Colorado State University Mountain Campus, Colorado, United States
- Campus: Mountain
- Website: www.mountaincampus.colostate.edu

Colorado State University Mountain Campus (also referred to as CSU Mountain Campus and the Mountain Campus), formerly Pingree Park, is a satellite campus of the Fort Collins, Colorado-based Colorado State University. CSU Mountain Campus is situated in Pingree Valley in the Mummy Range at 9,053 ft (2,759 m) approximately 24 miles (39 km) from the city of Fort Collins, Colorado.

During the summer it is home to a variety of conferences from around the country ranging from CSU students enrolled in Natural Resource and Forestry classes to corporate groups using its ropes course and finally Elderhostel groups organized through the Pingree office. The geographic area is still known as "Pingree Park." CSU renamed the park around controversial accusations of George Pingree being involved in the Sand Creek Massacre.

== Programs ==
Students swing from the Giant Swing at the Challenge Ropes Course.

Challenge Ropes Course

A popular program at CSU Mountain Campus is the Challenge Ropes Course. Many groups use the facilities, including students from both Colorado State University and Poudre School District. Many recreational and corporate groups include a stop at the Ropes Course for use in team building exercises. The course consists of several low and high elements built in 1989, with a large climbing wall and adjoining "Giant Swing" built in 2005. There are also multiple walk wires. The course was damaged severely in the Hourglass Fire of 1994, but was rebuilt in the following years.

Academics

Since 1915, CSU Mountain Campus has hosted summer sessions for students. Students stay in four-person cabins heated by wood-burning stoves. NR-220 is a required four-week field camp for undergraduate students in the College of Natural Resources. The Forestry program, F-230, is a one-week required program for Forestry majors.

Road Scholar Programs

Throughout the summer, various Road Scholar groups visit Pingree Park. Trips began in 1983 and now include intergenerational, watercolor, and musical programs, as well as intensive hiking trips.

Conferences

Six-bedroom conference cabins were constructed in 1995 after the old structures burnt in the 1994 fire. They can house various private organizations that go to Pingree Park for retreats, workshops and meetings.

== The Five Summits ==
View of the Mummy Range from the Mountain Campus.

Five mountains among the mummy range hold particular attention to the students and staff of the Mountain Campus. It is often a goal to hike all of the summits in one season and there is even a trip that tackles them all in 24 hours. These summits are:

Signal Mountain - 11,262 ft (3,433 m)

Stormy Peaks - 12,148 ft (3,703 m)

Fall Mountain - 12,258 ft (3,736 m)

Comanche Peak - 12,702 ft (3,872 m)

Hagues Peak - 13,560 ft (4,130 m)

== History ==
The land comprising CSU Mountain Campus has been home to many different communities during its history before becoming the campus that it is today.

=== Early history ===
The original inhabitants of CSU Mountain Campus were Native Americans from the Arapaho, Mountain Ute and Cherokee tribes. Fur trappers arrived in the 1830s followed by gold prospectors in the 1850s.

=== George W. Pingree ===
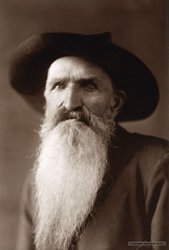
George W. Pingree

In 1867 George W. Pingree traveled up the South Fork of the Poudre River and into the park looking for trees to make suitable railroad ties for the Union Pacific Railroad. In 1868, Pingree established a logging camp in the valley that now bears his name.

=== 1890 fire ===
In 1890, a forest fire engulfed most of the area around the park destroying the Ponderosa pine forest and resulting in the proliferation of Lodgepole pine and Aspen (the current dominant species in the park). Remnants of the original forest can be found along the ridge south of the Pingree Valley.

=== Ramsey and Koenig era ===
The Koenig children along with Joe Bennett (back right) pose with their schoolteacher. Circa 1920.

In 1897, two brothers, Hugh and Charles Ramsey, homesteaded the present southern portion of the campus. The homesteads were officially deeded in 1903. The Ramsey's made a living ranching and operating a sawmill. In 1912, Hugh Ramsey hired Frank Koenig. Koenig spent the winter with the Ramsey family and helped build a road over Pennock Pass. In 1913, Ramsey, Koenig, and a helper Tom Bennett built a road to Twin Lakes. Frank Koenig and Hazel Ramsey were married that year. Hugh Ramsey moved to the upper ranch and sold to Frank Koenig most of the property except for 40 acres (160,000 m^{2}) which he gave to Hazel as a wedding present.

Terrible hardships struck the residents of the Pingree Valley in the early years. In 1907 diphtheria struck killing one son and two infant daughters. In 1919, Frank and Hazel Koenig's twin infants died of whooping cough while the family was snow bound. The children were buried in a plot next to their cousins. The original homestead cabin was burned to the ground and the present structure was built. In addition to the many structures that still stand of the original ranch community, the Koenig's retain their legacy in the region through many geographical names. In 1915, Rocky Mountain National Park was created through an act of Congress. Frank Koenig was selected as one of the initial three park rangers and went on to name many of the surrounding geographic features. (Emmaline Lake after his mother, Hazeline Lake after his wife, and Ramsey Peak after his father-in-law).

=== Integration into Colorado State University ===
As early as 1910, Pingree Valley was the interest of the fledgling university. Through the work of Professor B.O. Longyear, a special act of Congress allowed Colorado Agricultural College (now Colorado State University) the right to select tracts of federal land for biological research and practical study. In 1912, Colorado Agricultural College President, Charles A. Lory; Colorado National Forest Supervisor, H.N. Wheeler; State Forester and Professor, B.O. Longyear; President Edwards of the State Board of Agriculture; and Colorado Governor, E.M. Ammons, selected 1,600 acres (6.5 km^{2}) of land, including the present campus land in Pingree Park. The group traveled by Stanley Steamer and then by horse through Pennock Pass. While selecting the land, they stayed at Hazel and Frank Koenig's cabin.

A functional campus was erected quickly with the first building completed in 1913 to serve as bunkhouse, cafeteria and classroom. During construction, Hazel Koenig cooked for construction workers at the site. In 1915 the first Civil Engineering class was held and then in 1917 the first Forestry field camp was held under Professor Longyear with one student in attendance.

View from the trail of the Koenig Homestead at CSU Mountain Campus, now a historical site.

The campus expanded slowly with a bunkhouse built in 1927 (now the present day Store and Recreation Area) and smaller buildings being constructed for faculty and daily operation. The first automobile to make it to Pingree Valley was a Stanley Steamer in 1919. Telephone lines were installed to the campus in 1928 and electrical lines installed in 1964. Forestry and Natural Resource students have been in attendance every summer with the exception of several years during World War II. In 1976 a conference center was completed that attracts 6,000 visitors per season. In 1972 the university purchased the remaining 163 acres (0.66 km^{2}) of land in the valley from Frank and Hazel Koenig. Hazel Koenig died in Loveland, Colorado in 1975, followed by her husband Frank in 1977. In 1997, the Colorado Historical Society named 80 acres (320,000 m^{2}) of the Ramsey/Koenig Ranch as a State Historic District. Grants from the society helped to restore the ranch's log barn in 1998 and the homestead in 1999.

== Hourglass Fire of 1994 ==
The Hourglass fire started on July 1, 1994 near the Hourglass Reservoir which gave the fire its name. It started with a lightning strike which caused a crown fire. It burned down the North Dorm and twelve other buildings. The fire serves as a case-study for natural resources students as the forest regrows.

== Name change ==
On April 6, 2015 Pingree Park was renamed Colorado State University Mountain Campus. This name change was brought about to better align the mountain campus with Colorado State University's other campus locations. Additionally, the name change was a conscious effort to separate the Mountain Campus and its land-grant mission from George Pingree. While Colorado State University did not name the campus after Pingree – it is a USGS designation for the valley where the campus is located – the university acknowledged Pingree's self-proclaimed role in the Sand Creek Massacre and felt it appropriate to remove his name from the title of the Mountain Campus.
