= Sand Creek Township =

Sand Creek Township may refer to:

== Colorado ==
Sand Creek Township, Larimer County, Colorado just south of the Wyoming state line, in Larimer County, Colorado

== Indiana ==
- Sand Creek Township, Bartholomew County, Indiana
- Sand Creek Township, Decatur County, Indiana
- Sand Creek Township, Jennings County, Indiana

== Iowa ==
- Sand Creek Township, Union County, Iowa, in Union County, Iowa

== Kansas ==
- Sand Creek Township, Meade County, Kansas, in Meade County, Kansas

== Minnesota ==
- Sand Creek Township, Minnesota

== Nebraska ==
- Sand Creek Township, Holt County, Nebraska

== South Dakota ==
- Sand Creek Township, Beadle County, South Dakota, in Beadle County, South Dakota
