= Sand Creek (Willow Creek tributary) =

Stream in Nebraska, U.S.

Sand Creek Tributary to Willow Creek
- Location of Sand Creek mouth Sand Creek (Willow Creek tributary) (the United States)

Location
- Country: United States
- State: Nebraska
- County: Rock

Physical characteristics
- Source: North Fork Elkhorn River divide
  - location: about 1 mile northeast of Willowdale School
  - coordinates: 42°41′20.00″N 099°22′43.00″W
  - elevation: 2,210 ft (670 m)
- Mouth: Willow Creek
  - location: about 3 miles south-southwest of Holton School
  - coordinates: 42°44′46.01″N 099°23′29.39″W
  - elevation: 1,936 ft (590 m)
- Length: 4.60 mi (7.40 km)
- Basin size: 6.30 square miles (16.3 km^{2})
- Discharge
  - location: Niobrara River
  - average: 0.82 cu ft/s (0.023 m^{3}/s) at mouth with Willow Creek

Basin features
- Progression: Willow Creek → Niobrara River → Missouri River → Mississippi
- River system: Niobrara
- Bridges: 888th Road, 455th Avenue, 889th Road, 890th Road

Sand Creek is a 4.60 mi (7.40 km) long second-order tributary to Willow Creek in Rock County, Nebraska.

Sand Creek rises on the North Fork Elkhorn River divide about 1 mile (1.6 km) northeast of Willowdale School and then flows generally north to join Willow Creek about 3 miles (4.8 km) south-southwest of Holton School.

== Watershed ==
Sand Creek drains 6.30 square miles (16.3 km^{2}) of area, receives about 24.2 in/year (61 cm/year) of precipitation, and is about 2.96% forested.

== See also ==
- List of rivers of Nebraska
