= Hare's Ear =

Artificial fly fishing lure

- Artificial fly
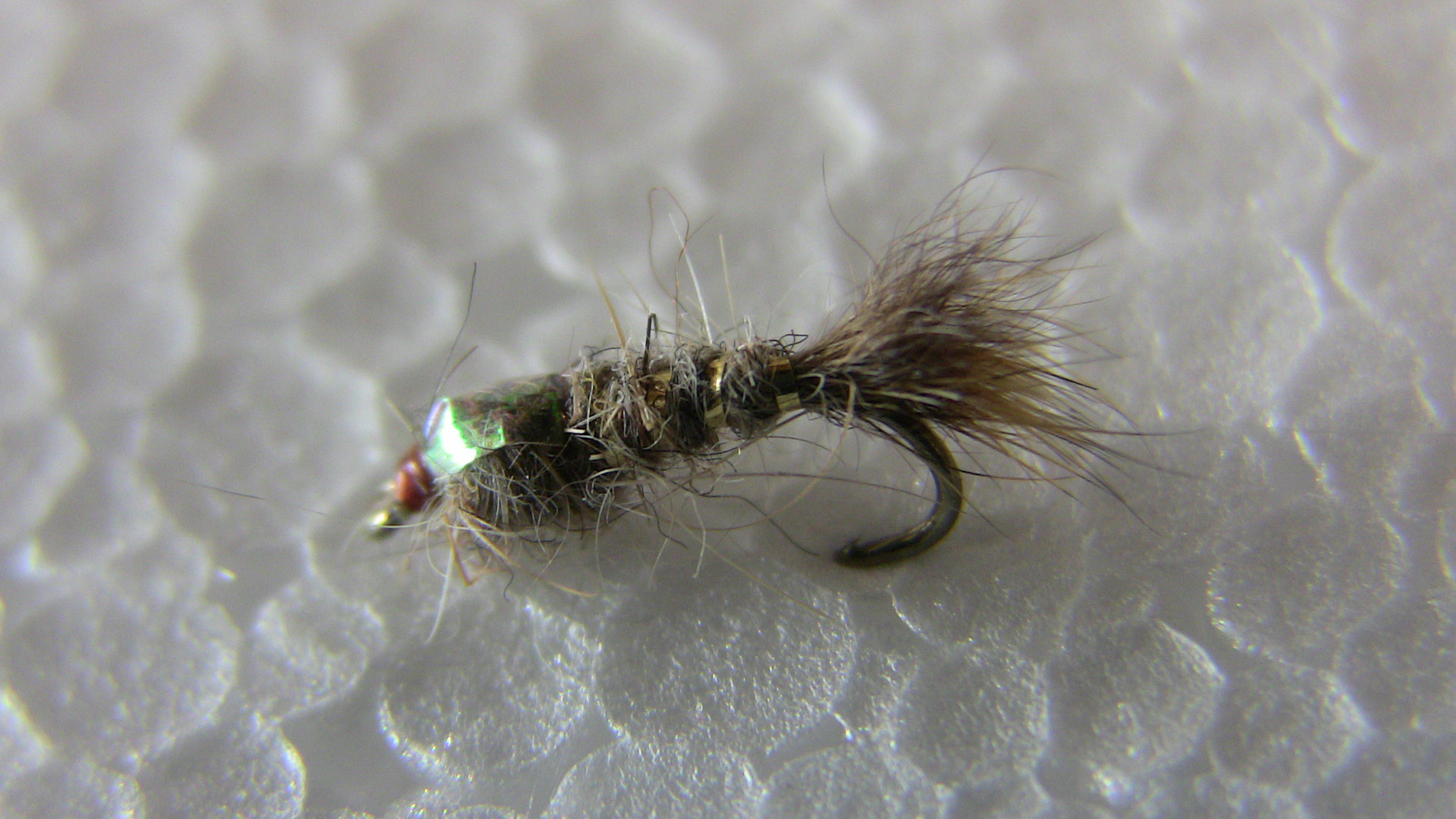
- Gold ribbed hare's ear
- Type: Nymph
- Imitates: Mayfly larvae

History
- Creator: Unknown
- Created: Unknown

Materials
- Typical sizes: 10-18
- Typical hooks: TMC 3769
- Thread: Black 6/0, 8/0 nylon
- Tail: Guard hairs from hare's ear
- Body: Hare's ear dubbing
- Wing: Mottled Turkey tail feather
- Ribbing: Fine gold wire or tinsel
- Thorax: Dark hare's ear dubbing
- Head: Black thread

Uses
- Primary use: Trout

Reference(s)
- Pattern references: Trout Flies-The Tier's Reference (1999) Hughes

The Hare's Ear or Gold Ribbed Hare’s Ear is a traditional artificial fly imitating an aquatic insect larva (nymph) used in fly fishing.

== Description ==
The Hare's Ear nymph fly is fished below the surface thus a wet fly or nymph. It is an older pattern that imitates a variety of aquatic life, including scuds, sow bugs, mayfly nymphs, and caddis larvae.

== Tying ==
Soft hair and stiff bristles from a hare are wound around the shank of the hook and fastened with gold wire that suggests segmentation. Sometimes a gold bead head is added for weight and stability in the water and a strand of pheasant feather is added for a tail. The bead head can be fastened near the eye of the hook. This pattern is commonly tied on size 10 - 16 nymph hooks. Traditional colouring is a brown body with orange or brown thread.

== Tactics ==
When this fly is immersed, the stiff fibers in the dubbing stand out and imitate the legs of an insect. Fish this lure below the surface with or without a small strike indicator and split-shot to help it sink. It is an effective pattern throughout the year because it covers a broad spectrum of prey that are active in every season.
