= Ted's Place, Colorado =

Historic gas station in Colorado, U.S.

Coordinates: 40°39′50″N 105°11′22″W

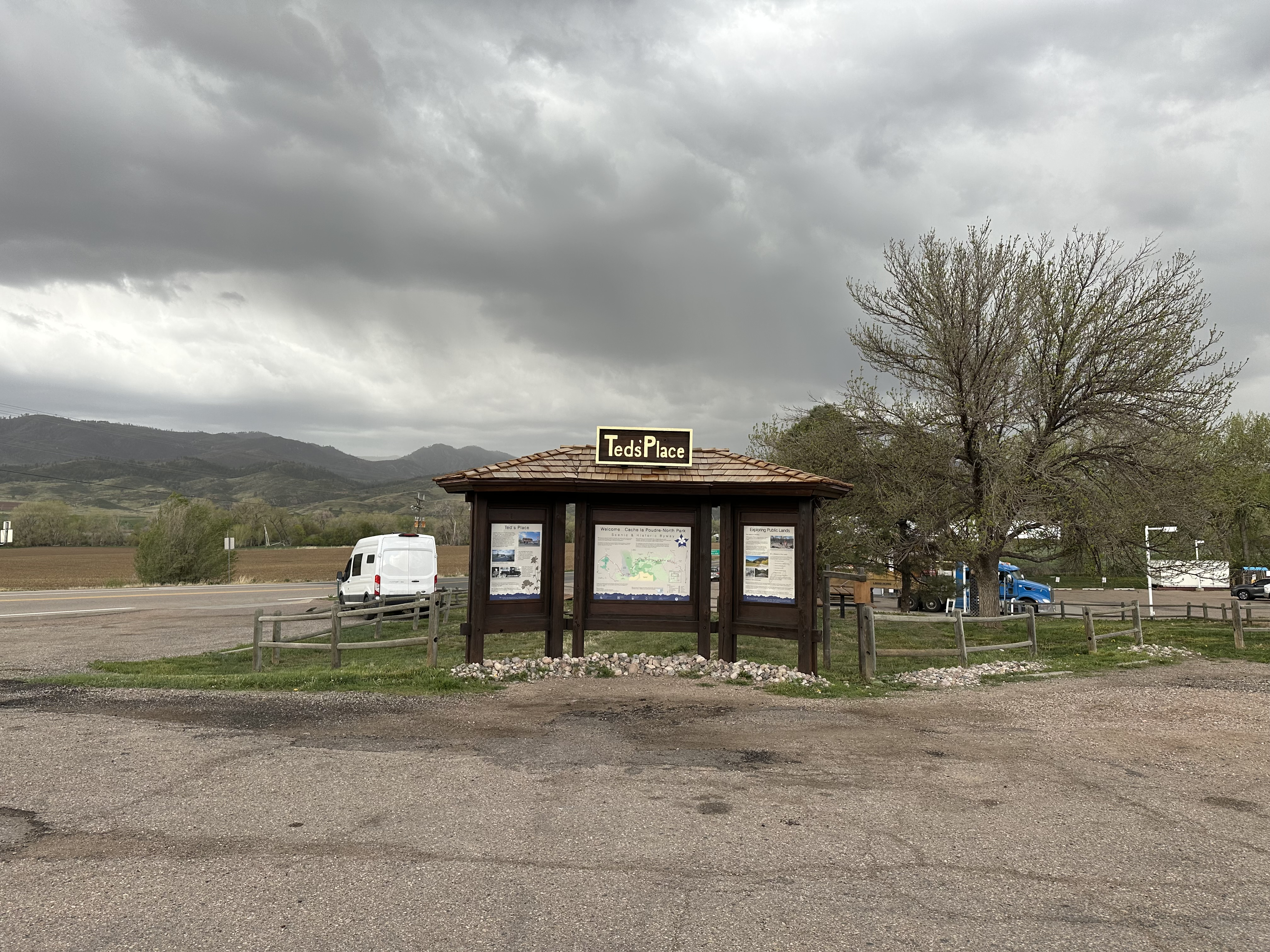
Ted's Place in 2025

Ted's Place is a gas station in Larimer County, Colorado, United States. Ted's Place is located near the mouth of the Poudre Canyon, approximately 5 miles (8.0 km) northwest of Fort Collins.

In May 1922, Ted Herring opened a filling station and store at the intersection of US 287 and Colorado State Highway 14. The popular stop near the canyon was quickly named 'Ted's Place' by local residents. After Herring's death in 1963, the property had various owners and as of 2024 is owned by Loaf 'N Jug.

There are "a number of log cabins built by forgotten pioneers" to the south.
