= U.S. Route 287 =

U.S. Highway in the United States

U.S. Route 287
- US 287 highlighted in red

Route information
- Auxiliary route of US 87
- Length: 1,791 mi (2,882 km)
- Existed: 1935–present

Major junctions
- South end: US 69 / US 96 in Port Arthur, TX
- I-45 at Ennis, TX; I-35E at Waxahachie, TX; I-20 at Arlington, TX; I-30 at Fort Worth, TX; I-40 / US 87 at Amarillo, TX; I-70 at Limon, CO; I-25 / US 87 at Denver, CO; I-80 at Laramie, WY; I-90 at Three Forks, MT; I-15 at Helena, MT
- North end: US 89 in Choteau, MT

Location
- Country: United States
- States: Texas, Oklahoma, Colorado, Wyoming; Montana

Highway system
- United States Numbered Highway System; List; Special; Divided

U.S. Route 287 (US 287) is a north–south (physically northwest–southeast) United States highway. At 1,791 miles (2,882 km) long, it is the second longest three-digit U.S. Route, behind US 281. The highway is broken into two segments by Yellowstone National Park, where unnumbered park roads serve as a connector.

The highway's northern terminus is in Choteau, Montana, 100 miles (160 km) south of the Canadian border, at an intersection with US 89. Its southern terminus (as well as those of US 69 and US 96) is in Port Arthur, Texas at an intersection with State Highway 87 (SH 87), five miles (8 km) up the Sabine River from the Gulf of Mexico. It intersects its parent route US 87 twice, overlapping it from Amarillo to Dumas, Texas, and then crossing it in Denver, Colorado.

== Route description ==
=== Texas ===
US 287 originates at its southern terminus in Port Arthur as a branch of SH 87. From Port Arthur, US 287 runs concurrently with US 69 and US 96 to Lumberton, where US 96 diverges to the northeast and the co-signed US 287/US 69 continues northwesterly until US 287 and US 69 diverge in Woodville. Continuing northwesterly, US 287 merges with Interstate 45 (I-45) in Corsicana and follows the Interstate to Ennis, where it branches off and continues through Waxahachie, crossing I-35E and continuing north through Tarrant County, where it encounters and briefly merges with three different Interstates (I-820, I-20, and I-35W). From Fort Worth, US 287 continues north to Wichita Falls and continues just south of the Oklahoma border before entering the Texas Panhandle. A section of US 287, between Midlothian and Waxahachie, was dedicated as the Chris Kyle Memorial Highway, in honor of fallen SEAL Chris Kyle, whose hometown was Midlothian.

The highway continues through Amarillo, where it intersects I-40, and then runs north to Kerrick and crosses into neighboring Oklahoma.

=== Oklahoma ===
In Oklahoma, US 287 remains within Cimarron County, located at the end of the Panhandle. After crossing the state line north of Kerrick, Texas, the highway intersects SH 171 at its southern terminus. US 287 continues northwesterly, crossing the Beaver River, toward Boise City, the county seat. On the east side of town, the highway formerly ran concurrently with US 56, US 64, US 412, and SH 3. These five highways then entered the traffic circle in downtown Boise City. US 287 emerged from the north side of the circle, as well as US 385 and SH 3. Now US 287 bypasses town to the east. These three highways (US 287, US 385, SH 3) head north to the Colorado state line. SH 3 ends there, while US 287 and US 385 continue onward into Colorado.

=== Colorado ===
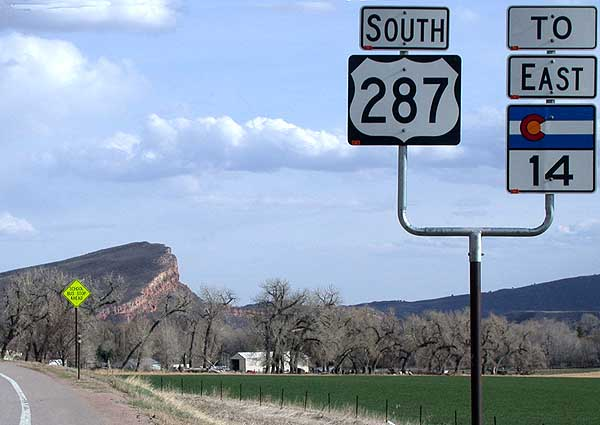
View south along US 287 in Larimer County, Colorado

From Oklahoma, US 287 and US 385 enter into a very rural part of Colorado. They continue in a north/northwest direction through the state. The two highways pass through the town of Campo, and make an interchange with US 160 on the outskirts of Springfield. In Lamar and Carlton, the highways make an interchange with US 50. Here US 385 heads east on US 50, and US 287/US 50 continue to the north. Just outside the town the highways make a sharp turn toward the west, and the road heading north is SH 196. South of Wiley, US 50 heads west, while US 287 turns north toward Wiley. East of Eads, US 287 turns toward the west again, briefly merging with SH 96. In Eads, SH 96 continues toward the west, while US 287 turns toward the north. Near Kit Carson, US 287 again turns toward the west and merges with US 40. Near Limon, the two highways make two interchanges with I-70 before passing through Limon. Then the two highways merge with I-70. Near the outskirts of Denver US 36 merges with the group of highways making the road, I-70/US 287/US 36/US 40.

Just past E-470, I-70 and US 36 split to follow a more northerly course, while US 287 and US 40 continue west into Downtown Denver on Colfax Avenue. The I-25, US 6, US 87, and US 85 interchange marks US 287's second junction with its parent route, US 87; the other is in Texas. Shortly thereafter, at a cloverleaf interchange with Federal Boulevard, SH 88 runs south, US 40 continues west on Colfax, and US 287 turns toward the north on Federal Boulevard. After crossing US 36 (Denver–Boulder Turnpike), US 287 turns west onto 120th Avenue where it overlaps SH 128. Just before meeting US 36 again in Broomfield, US 287 bends back to the north, leaving SH 128 which continues west through an interchange with SH 121 and US 36. At Baseline Road in Lafayette, SH 7 joins US 287 for about a mile, before SH 7 splits to the west on Arapahoe Avenue towards Boulder. It intersects SH 119 as it enters Longmont on Main Street, and then it intersects SH 66 at the north edge of town. In 2021 the Colorado State Senate Joint Resolution 21-018 designated the section of U.S. 287 between SH 66 in Longmont and SH 402 in Loveland as the SPC Gabriel David Conde Memorial highway. Gabriel Conde was a Berthoud High School graduate and a student at the Colorado School of Mines who joined the U.S. Army in 2015. He was killed in action in Afghanistan in April 2018. The road bypasses Berthoud en route to Loveland, where US 287 splits into the pair of one-way streets Lincoln Avenue (northbound) and Cleveland Avenue (southbound). It then divides the Loveland cemetery. This is the only cemetery in the US with a US Highway dividing it. Continuing north, US 287 passes through Fort Collins on College Avenue, merging with SH 14 at Jefferson Street. On the edge of the mountains at Ted's Place, SH 14 splits and heads west into Poudre Canyon, while US 287 continues north into Wyoming.

The section of US 287 between Fort Collins and Laramie, Wyoming, carries very heavy truck traffic and is regarded as quite dangerous. A 2023 Colorado Department of Transportation report found the highway has above-average crash rates, making the highway a good candidate for more safety improvements. The 30-mile section from north of Fort Collins to the Wyoming line has had 570 crashes, including 15 fatal wrecks since 2019, and at least 15 students from the University of Wyoming in Laramie have died on the road since 2000.

=== Wyoming ===
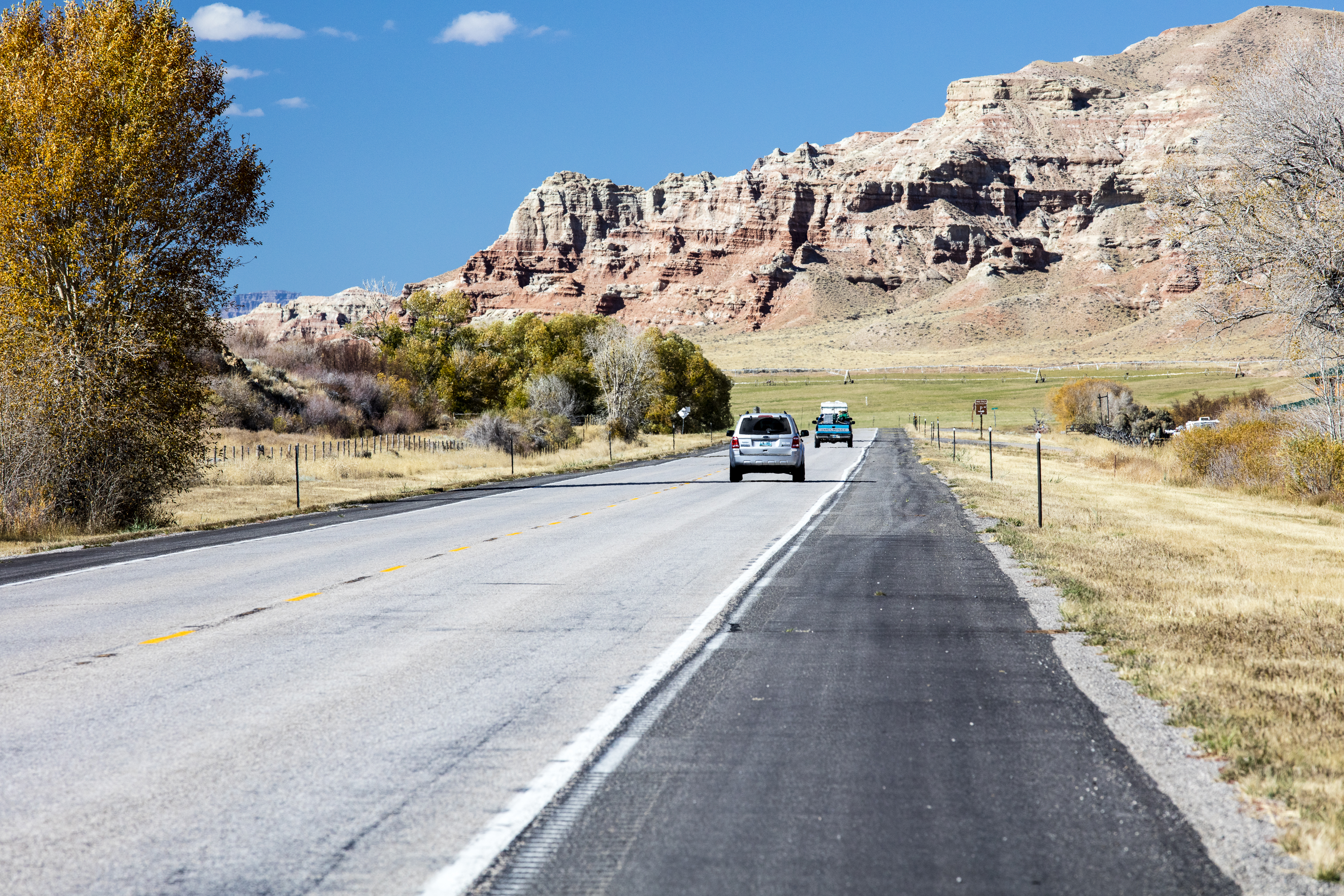
US 287 near Dubois, Wyoming

US 287 enters Wyoming through a pass between the Laramie Mountains to the east and the Medicine Bow Mountains to the west. In Laramie, US 287 crosses I-80 and merges with US 30 and the two highways continue to head north. After passing Medicine Bow, these highways turn west-southwest and return to I-80 near Walcott, where they merge with the interstate west until Rawlins. US 287 branches off from I-80 and US 30 and heads into the town, following I-80 Business and US 30 Business for a short distance. In Downtown Rawlins, US 287 leaves I-80 Business and US 30 Business and merges with Wyoming Highway 789 (WYO 789) to Lander, where WYO 789 heads toward the northeast and US 287 heads toward the northwest. US 287 merges with US 26 in the very mountainous terrain of West Central Wyoming, and the two highways head west. The highways enter Grand Teton National Park. In Moran, US 287 and US 26 meet US 89 and US 191. US 26 heads south merging with US 191 and US 89. US 287 heads north merging with US 191 and US 89, passing through the John D. Rockefeller Jr. Memorial Parkway before ending at the South Entrance of Yellowstone National Park. While US 287 and other U.S. Routes are officially discontinuous through the park, some commercially produced maps show these highways running inside Yellowstone National Park itself along its unnumbered roads and across the Wyoming–Montana state line.

=== Montana ===
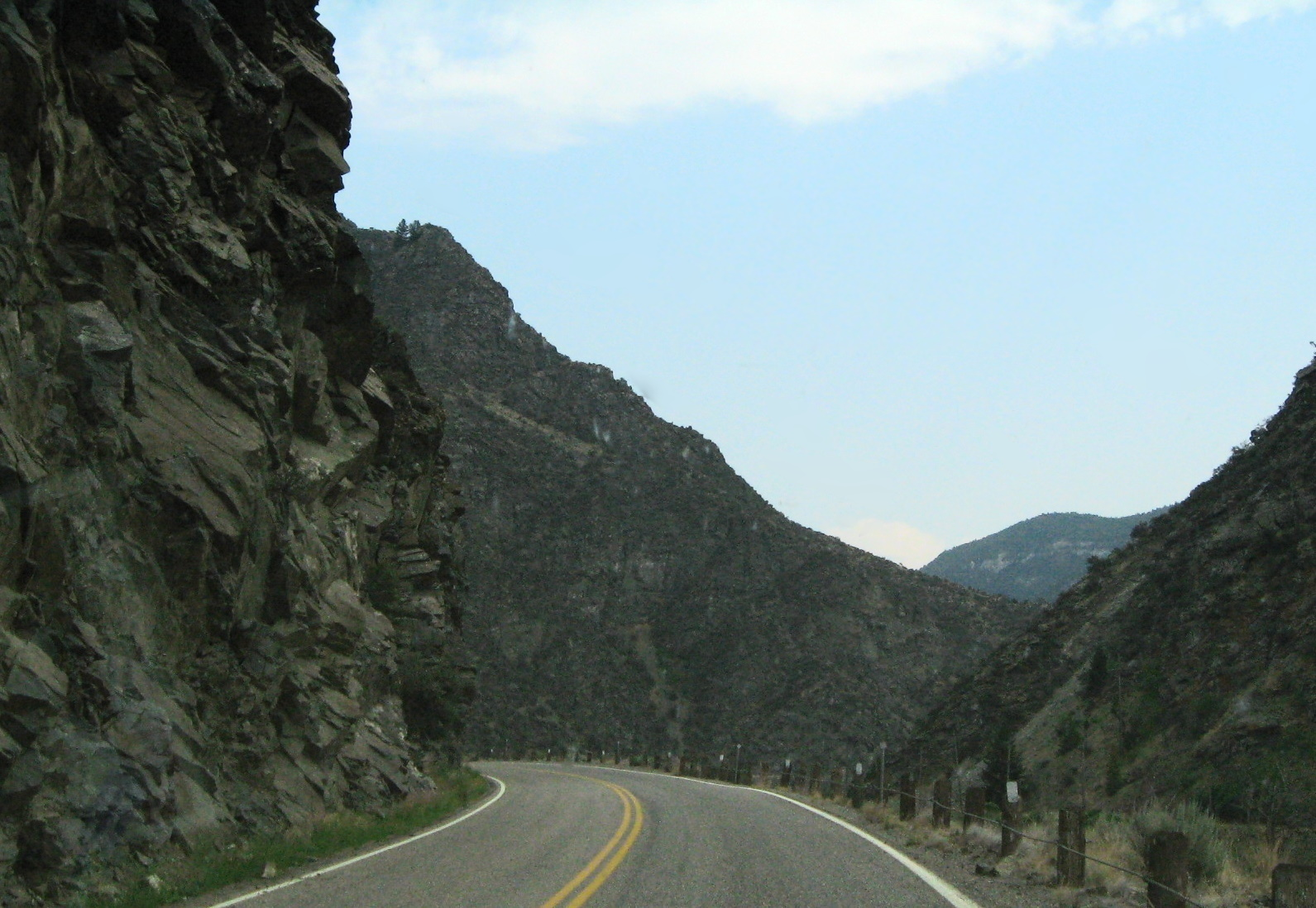
US 287 north of Yellowstone National Park

US 287 in Montana begins at the West Entrance of Yellowstone National Park in West Yellowstone, terminating a concurrency with US 20. US 287 and US 191 split north of the town. US 287 heads toward the northwest, merging with Montana Highway 2 (MT 2) north of Sappington, and running northeast. At I-90, MT 2 ends and US 287 continues to head north. In Townsend, US 287 merges with US 12 and the two highways continue north. At I-15 (near Helena), US 287 continues north on I-15 and US 12 heads west through downtown Helena. Northeast of Wolf Creek, US 287 and I-15 split with US 287 heading northwest and I-15 heading northeast. US 287 ends at US 89 in Choteau.

== History ==
When US 287 was first commissioned in 1939, it extended only from the south entrance of Yellowstone National Park to Denver, Colorado. The route was extended southward to the Gulf Coast at Port Arthur, Texas in 1940, and northward into Montana to US 89 at Choteau, Montana in 1965. US 89 continues north of Choteau into Alberta as Highway 2 through the major cities of Calgary and Edmonton, connecting with a Canadian link to the Alaska Highway in the latter.

Included in the route of US 287 is former US 370, which was commissioned in 1926 and connected Amarillo to Bowie, traveling concurrently with US 70 between Vernon and Wichita Falls, Texas.

The Canada to Gulf Highway Association, which later became the U.S. Highway 287 Association, was active from the 1910s until the 1970s to promote US 287 as a popular tourist route, and was composed of members from businesses and organizations in cities along the route.

The Wyoming state transportation department started widening US 287 in 2009.

On April 22, 2021, the Oklahoma Legislature passed a bill that would rename part of US 287 in Oklahoma after President Donald Trump; it went into effect on November 1, 2021.

== Future ==
Future Interstate 47
- Location: Port Arthur–Choteau, Montana
- Length: 1,791 mi (2,882 km)

In 2017, House Bill 2026 (HB 2026) was filed in the Texas Legislature to provide funding for a study on upgrading US 287 in Texas to an Interstate highway, with the eventual goal of designating US 287 as an Interstate from Beaumont, Texas, to the Canadian border in Montana. HB 2026 later died in committee.

On May 11, 2026, U.S. Sen. John Cornyn (R-TX) introduced a bill to upgrade and rename US 287 as Interstate 47. Cornyn, who was seeking President Donald Trump's endorsement for re-election, said the conversion would save $5 billion in travel costs while honoring Trump, the 47th president.

== Major intersections ==
Southern segment

Texas

US 69 / US 96 in Port Arthur. US 69/US 287 travels concurrently to Woodville. US 96/US 287 travels concurrently to south of Lumberton.
I-10 in Beaumont. The highways travel concurrently through Beaumont.
US 90 in Beaumont
US 190 in Woodville
Future I-69 / US 59 in Corrigan
US 84 in Palestine. The highways travel concurrently through Palestine.
US 79 in Palestine
I-45 in Corsicana. The highways travel concurrently to Ennis.
US 77 in Waxahachie
I-35E in Waxahachie
US 67 in Midlothian
I-20 in Arlington. The highways travel concurrently to Fort Worth.
I-20 / I-820 in Fort Worth. I-820/US 287 travels concurrently through Fort Worth.
I-30 in Fort Worth
I-35W / US 377 in Fort Worth. The highways travel concurrently through Fort Worth.
I-820 in Fort Worth
I-35W / US 81 in Fort Worth. US 81/US 287 travels concurrently to Bowie.
US 380 in Decatur
US 82 west of Henrietta. The highways travel concurrently to Wichita Falls.
US 281 in Wichita Falls. The highways travel concurrently through Wichita Falls.
US 82 / US 277 in Wichita Falls. US 277/US 287 travels concurrently through Wichita Falls.
I-44 in Wichita Falls. The highways travel concurrently through Wichita Falls.
US 70 / US 183 in Oklaunion. The highways travel concurrently to Vernon.
US 183 / US 283 in Vernon
US 62 / US 83 in Childress
I-40 in Amarillo. The highways travel concurrently through Amarillo.
I-27 / I-40 / US 60 in Amarillo. US 60/US 287 travels concurrently through Amarillo.
US 87 in Amarillo. The highways travel concurrently to Dumas.
US 54 in Stratford

Oklahoma

US 56 / US 64 / US 412 east of Boise City
US 385 north of Boise City. The highways travel concurrently to Lamar, Colorado.

Colorado

US 160 south of Springfield
US 50 / US 385 in Lamar. US 50/US 287 travels concurrently to south of Wiley.
US 40 east of Kit Carson. The highways travel concurrently to Denver.
I-70 / US 24 east-southeast of Limon. US 24/US 287 travels concurrently to west of Limon.
I-70 in Limon
I-70 in Limon. The highways travel concurrently to Aurora.
US 36 in Byers. The highways travel concurrently to Aurora.
I-225 in Aurora
I-25 / US 6 / US 85 / US 87 in Denver
I-70 in Denver
I-76 in Berkley
US 36 in Westminster
US 34 in Loveland

Wyoming

I-80 in Laramie
US 30 in Laramie. The highways travel concurrently to east of Rawlins.
I-80 south-southeast of Walcott. The highways travel concurrently to east of Rawlins.
US 26 west-northwest of Morton. The highways travel concurrently to Moran.
US 26 / US 89 / US 191 in Moran. US 89/US 191/US 287 travels concurrently to the South Entrance to Yellowstone National Park.

Yellowstone National Park segment (unofficial designation)

US 89 travels concurrently from the park's South Entrance to north-northwest of West Thumb.
US 191 travels concurrently from the park's South Entrance to the park's West Entrance.
US 14 / US 16 / US 20 in West Thumb. US 20/US 191 travels concurrently to the park's West Entrance.

Northern segment

Montana
US 20 / US 191 from the West Entrance to Yellowstone National Park; the highways travel concurrently to West Yellowstone.
I-90 northwest of Three Forks
US 12 in Townsend. The highways travel concurrently to Helena.
I-15 / US 12 in Helena. I-15/US 287 travels concurrently to northeast of Wolf Creek.
US 89 in Choteau

Browse numbered routes
← WYO 273	WY	→ WYO 290
← MT 287	MT	→ US 310
