= Sand Creek (Wyoming) =

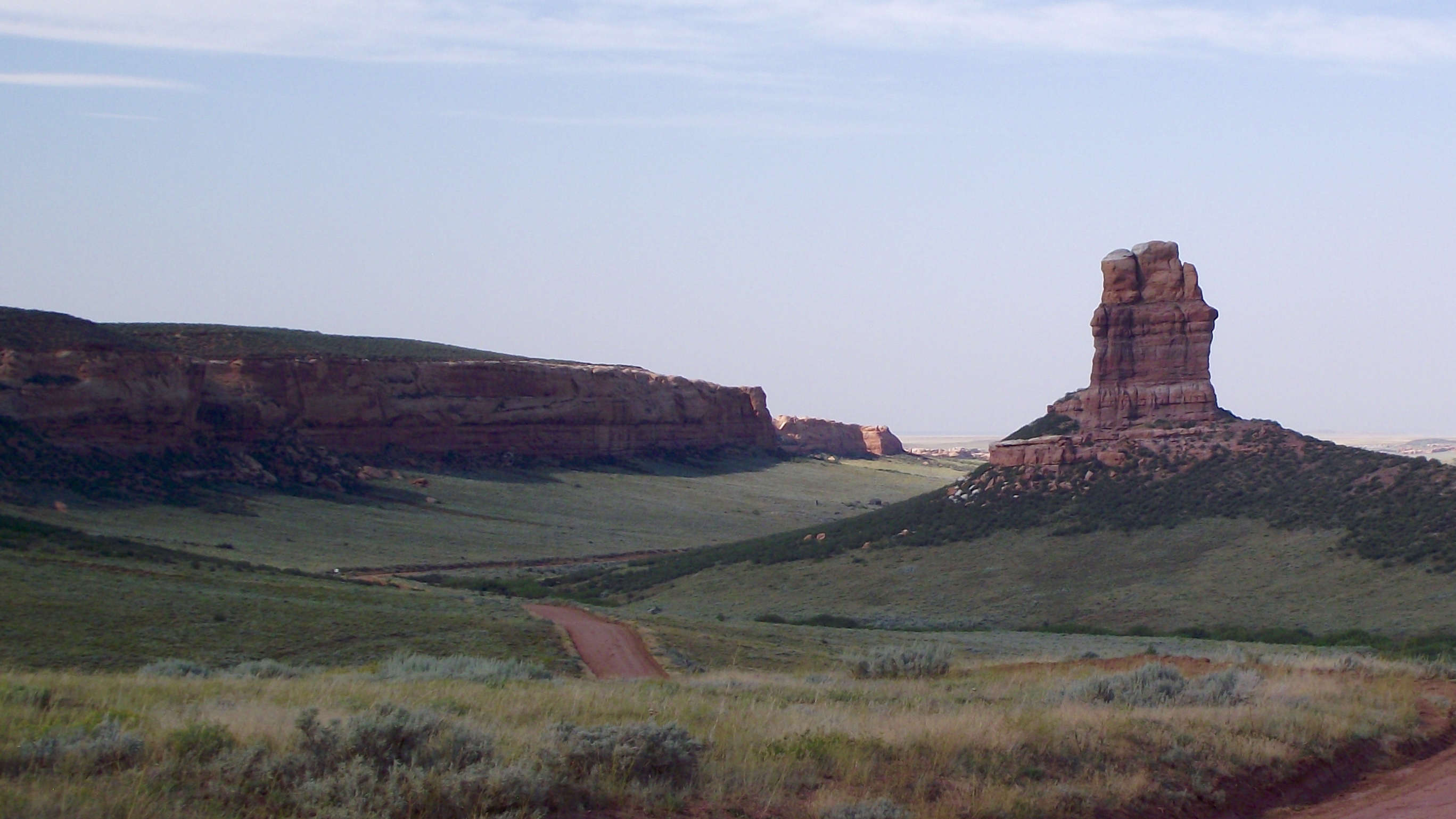

Physical characteristics
- Source
  - location: Laramie Mountains
  - coordinates: 40°49′46″N 105°47′04″W
- Mouth
  - location: Confluence with Laramie
  - coordinates: 41°12′56″N 105°43′52″W
  - elevation: 7,185 ft (2,190 m)

U.S. National Natural Landmark
- Designated: 1984

Sand Creek is a stream noted for the "most spectacular examples of cross-bedded sandstone and topple blocks in North America". Sand Creek flows from the Laramie Mountains in Larimer County, Colorado into Albany County, Wyoming where it joins the Laramie River.

The area where Sand Creek crosses the border between Colorado and Wyoming (40°59′49″N 105°46′14″W) was designated a National Natural Landmark in 1984.

== See also ==
- List of National Natural Landmarks
- List of rivers of Colorado
- List of rivers of Wyoming
- Sand Creek National Natural Landmark
- Sand Creek Township
