= Poudre Canyon =

Canyon in Larimer County, Colorado

Coordinates: 40°41′53″N 105°37′24″W

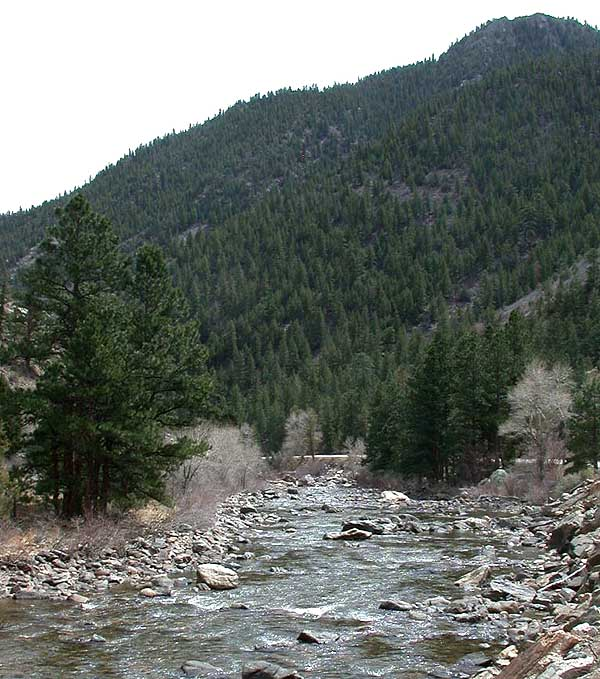
View of the lower Poudre Canyon west of Teds Place and below the Narrows

The Poudre Canyon is a narrow verdant canyon, approximately 40 miles (64 km) long, on the upper Cache la Poudre River (called the "Poudre" for short, which locals pronounce as "Pooder") in Larimer County, Colorado in the United States. The canyon is a glacier-formed valley through the foothills of the Front Range of the Rocky Mountains northwest of Fort Collins. The Poudre Canyon is home to many forms of recreation including fishing, hiking, rock climbing, whitewater rafting, kayaking, and camping.

== Description ==
The canyon begins in northern Rocky Mountain National Park, at an elevation of approximately 9,000 ft (2,700 m), where the Poudre descends from near the continental divide. It winds gently to the northeast, then east, descending the slope of the Colorado Tertiary Pediment, emerging through the southern end of the Laramie Foothills north of Bellvue at an elevation of approximately 5,000 ft (1,500 m). Except for the small upper portion of the canyon north of Rocky Mountain National Park, State Highway 14 runs through the canyon. The route of the highway provides the principal vehicle access to the canyon and furnishes a road link between Fort Collins and North Park on the western side of Cameron Pass, which is accessible from the upper canyon. Most of the canyon is within the Canyon Lakes Ranger District of the Roosevelt National Forest, which is headquartered in nearby Fort Collins.

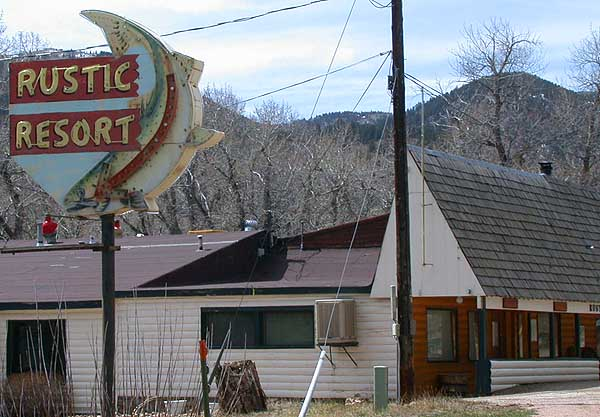
Rustic Resort in the upper Poudre Canyon

The flanks of the canyon wall are gently sloping and forested along most of its length, with the exception of several "narrows", at which the river has carved through recent formations leaving behind large glacial debris. The canyon is inhabited along most of its length downstream from Kinikinik. All of the communities in the canyon are unincorporated. Most of the habitation is the form of small cabins, some of which are inhabited only during season. Resort cabin communities for fishing and hunting are found sporadically along the canyon downstream from Rustic, a small unincorporated community. Rustic was home to the Rustic Hotel, which was established in 1881 and burned down in 2008.

The canyon is relatively isolated compared to ones further south along the Colorado Front Range and hosts mainly private resides, public campsites, and small-scale tourist enterprises. The canyon is distinctly less developed than the Big Thompson Canyon west of Loveland. The commercial establishments, notably in Poudre Park, cater mostly to local clientele except during the fishing and whitewater rafting season, when the canyon receives a modest number of regional and national visitors. Colorado State University operates a small campus in the mountains at Pingree Park, which is named for George Pingree, an early settler in the canyon in the 19th century.

== Wildlife and ecology ==
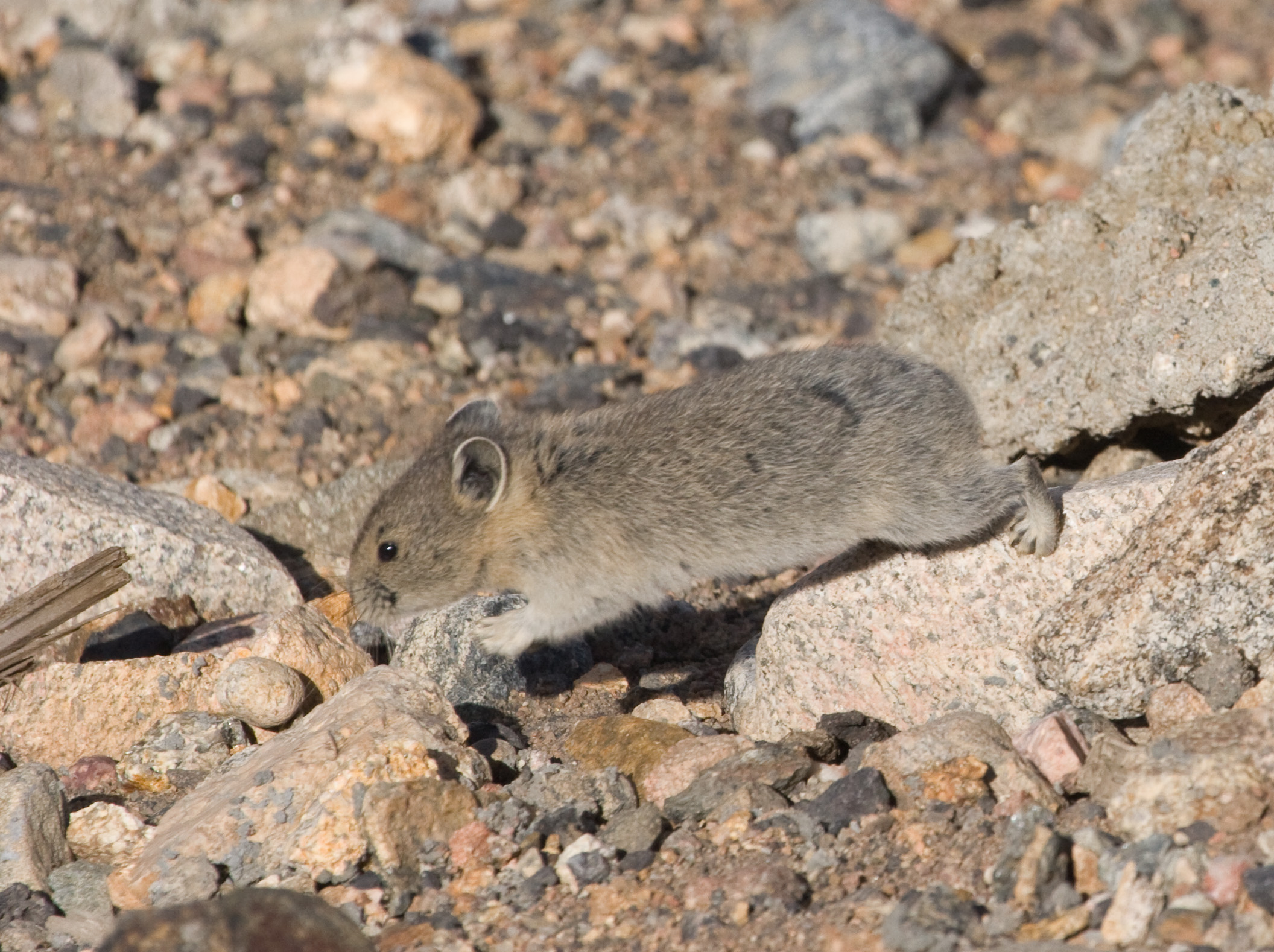
Pika in the snow in the Poudre Canyon

There are various species of vegetation and animals that inhabit the Poudre canyon which are typically found all throughout northern Colorado. The different type of wildlife that are most typically spotted in the area are multiple species of small rodents or rodent adjacent animals such as squirrels, chipmunks, and pika which are accompanied by elk and deer. The most dominant types of vegetation consist of trees such as the Ponderosa Pine, Rocky Mountain Juniper, Aspen, and Douglas Fir along with different shrubs like Willow, Maple, and Sagebrush.

== History ==
The canyon has been inhabited by various tribes such as the Utes, Arapahoe, and Paleo-Indians for thousands of years. In the 19th century it was the site of trapping expeditions by early settlers. The relative lack of mineral resources in the surrounding area spared the canyon from intense population increases during the Colorado mining boom (see Colorado Gold Rush). During the gold rush, the canyon was subject to silver, copper, and gold mining which was an important fixture of Colorado's economy in the mid to late 1800's. These valuable minerals were found within the granite batholith walls which are dotted with quartz, feldspar, and mica. The walls of the canyon were formed by glaciers during the Bull Lake and Pinedale Glaciation periods as recently as 30,000 to 10,000 years ago. In the early 1880s, the canyon was surveyed for a railroad by archrivals, the Union Pacific Railroad and the Chicago, Burlington and Quincy Railroad, with the intention of completing a transcontinental line through the Rockies. The canyon was never the site of a railroad, however, during the 1920s a road was constructed through the narrows.

== Notable fires ==
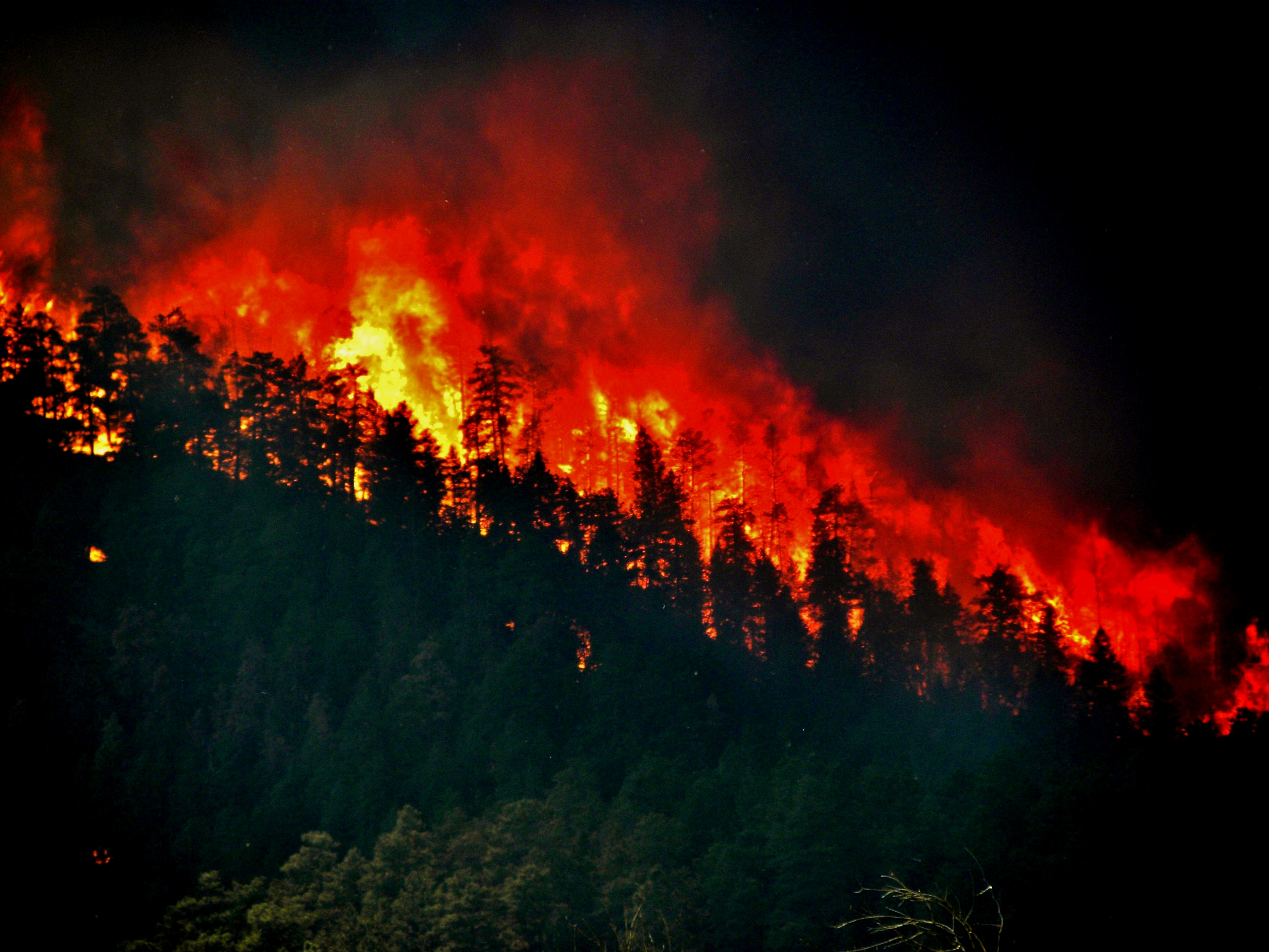
Trees torching in Roosevelt National Forest during the High Park Fire, June 2012

In recent years multiple fires have burned through the canyon and left noticeable burn scars. The High Park (June 2012) and Hewett Gulch (May 2012) fires damaged a combined 95,000 acres surrounding the lower section of the canyon and further to the south. In August 2020, the Cameron Peak Fire started at Chambers Lake in the upper section of the Poudre Canyon. The Cameron Peak Fire burned for 112 days, damaging 208,663 acres, a large portion of which surrounding the Poudre Canyon and Highway 14.

== Recreation ==
=== Hiking ===
Roosevelt National Forest in the vicinity of the canyon is laced with numerous trails that follow side gulches into the surrounding mountains. The trails serve double seasonal duty, as hiking trails in the summer and as cross-country skiing trails in the winter. One such trailhead at Long Draw Reservoir leads over La Poudre Pass along the Never Summer Mountains to the headwaters of the Colorado River in Rocky Mountain National Park.

=== Rock climbing ===
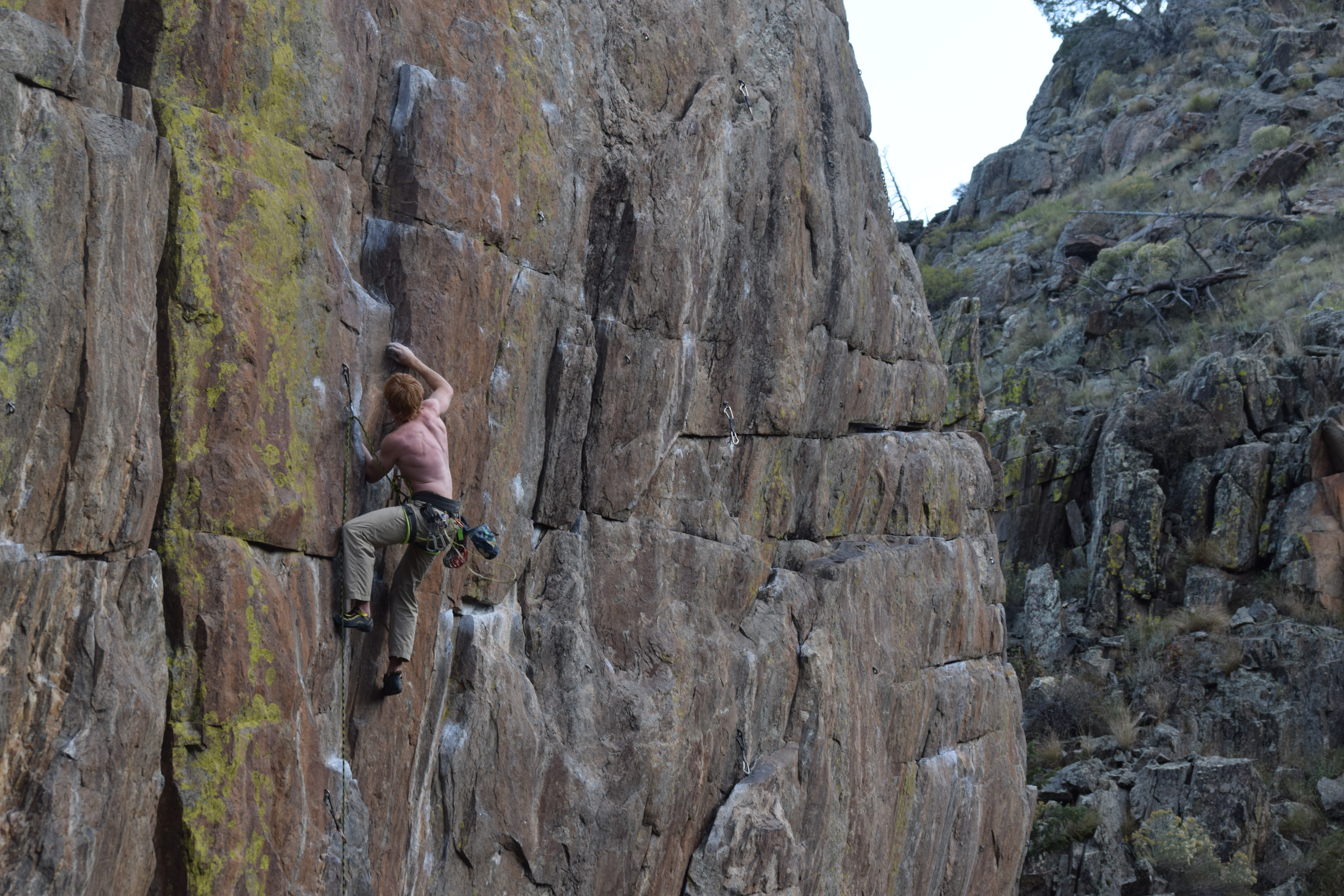
Rock Climber on the route ODK (12a) on the Upper Echelon Wall in the Poudre Canyon

The steep walls of the canyon are home to a wide variety of trad, sport climbing, and bouldering. Plenty of locals will drive up to and over an hour of driving to the areas that they recreate. Some popular places include Grey Rock (which can double as a short hike), Triple Tier (which includes Chimney Sweep Wall, Middle Class Wall, and Upper Echelon Wall), Palace (which requires a river crossing), The Lower, Middle, and Upper Narrows. Some less frequented places that are west of Rustic include Hatchery, Pearl, 420 Crag, and many others.

=== Fishing ===
Fly-fishing is the most popular form of fishing in the canyon. The most popular species for fishing in the river are various species of trout which are stocked in the river annually by Colorado Parks and Wildlife. There are many different types of trout that run throughout the river including brown trout (which are the most dominant species), rainbow trout, cutthroat and cuttbows. Midges and Blue Winged Olive fly patterns are some of the most popular on the river along with different grasshopper and mayfly patterns in the summer.

=== Camping and picnicking ===
The United States Forest Service maintains a series of picnic areas and campgrounds along the river, including one campground facility named for local historian Ansel Watrous, whose 1911 history of the area is the standard early reference about the canyon itself.

=== Rafting ===
The Poudre canyon hosts a wide range of whitewater rafting and kayaking opportunities. Some popular sections include The Narrows, a section of the canyon hosting various class IV-V+ sections of whitewater, and calmer sections past the Poudre Park Picnic Site (classes III-IV). The most popular times to go down the river are usually from May to late summer where the water is high and temperatures are warm. Numerous local establishments host guided tours during the busy season.
