= Livermore, Colorado =

Unincorporated community in Larimer County, CO, USA

- Unincorporated community
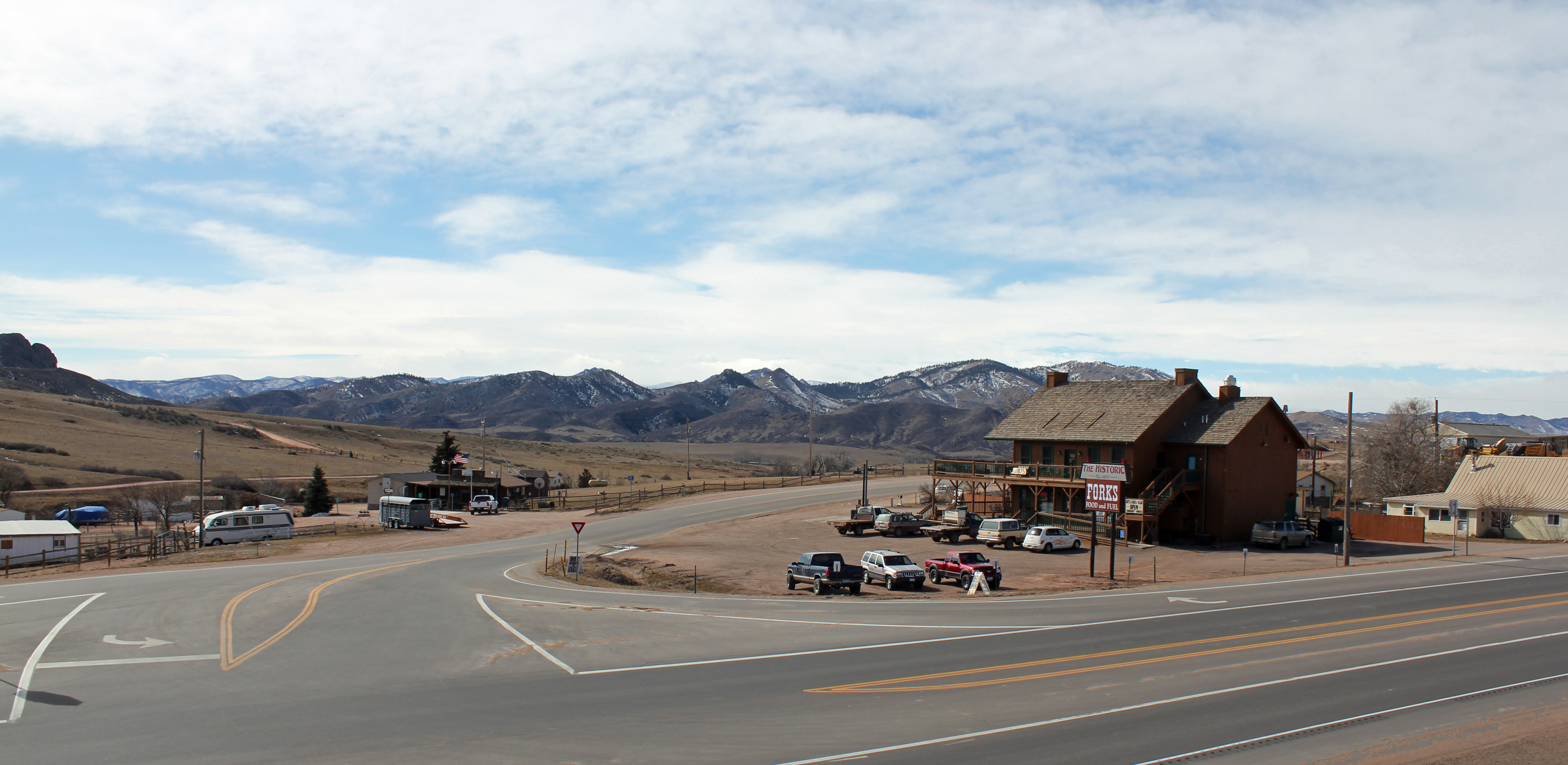
- Livermore in 2014

- Location in Colorado Location in the United States
- Coordinates: 40°47′40″N 105°13′02″W
- Country: United States
- State: Colorado
- County: Larimer
- Elevation: 5,896 ft (1,797 m)
- Time zone: UTC-7 (MST)
  - Summer (DST): UTC-6 (MDT)
- ZIP code: 80536
- Area code: 970
- GNIS feature ID: 170174

Livermore is an unincorporated community and a U.S. Post Office in Larimer County, Colorado, United States. The Livermore Post Office has the ZIP Code 80536.

A post office called Livermore has been in operation since 1871. According to tradition, the community's name is an amalgamation of the names of settlers Livernash and Moore.
