= Fort Collins Agricultural Colony =

The Fort Collins Agricultural Colony was a 19th-century enterprise in Larimer County, Colorado to promote new agricultural and commercial settlement in and around the town of Fort Collins. Founded in the autumn of 1872 as an outgrowth of the Union Colony in nearby Greeley, the colony was instrumental in the early growth of Fort Collins, as well as in making it an agricultural center in the Colorado Territory at a time when the region was still known primarily for its mineral resources.

== History ==
The town of Fort Collins had been founded in the previous decade on the site of the decommissioned Camp Collins of the United States Army. Moreover, the territorial legislature had designated the site of the Colorado Agricultural College to be in Fort Collins in 1870, although no money had been allocated for structures. A recurring source of anxiety among local leaders was the lack of railroad, which would not arrive until 1877.

The 1872 colony came two years after the establishment of the Greeley Colony downstream on the Poudre and was led by General Robert A. Cameron, an officer in the Greeley Colony. The success of the Greeley Colony, which was intended by its founder Nathan Meeker as a religiously-oriented utopian community, prompted its officers to expand the enterprise, although without quite the degree of religious idealism of the first effort. Rather the Fort Collins was as much of a local effort at boosting the population as it was a means of establishing a religiously-oriented cooperative. In addition to Cameron, officers and trustees included many early prominent residents and business owners of Fort Collins, including John C. Matthews, Judge A.F. Howes, J.M. Sherwood, Colonel J.E. Remington, N.H. Meldrum, B.T. Whedbee, Benjamin Harrison Eaton, and Joseph Mason.

The colony plan called for the division of 3,000 acres (12 km^{2}) of land immediately adjoining the existing town to divided into 10, 20, and 40 acre (40,000, 81,000 and 162,000 m^{2}) lots. The new platted lands were largely west and south of the existing town of Fort Collins, and contiguous the existing grid. Thus the colony would extend the town away from the Cache la Poudre River . Unlike the existing town plat, which was roughly parallel to the along the old Overland Stage road along the Poudre, the new lands would be oriented towards the compass. College Avenue, Mountain Avenue, and other major thoroughfares of the grid plan of downtown Fort Collins were laid out in the new plan of the colony. The older part of town has since become known as "Old Town Fort Collins."

The colony invited anyone to join "who is possessed of a good moral character" by purchasing a certificate ranging in price from 50 to US$250. A fifty-dollar certificate entitled the purchased to one town lot. Larger certificates entitled the purchaser to locate both a business and residence in the colony, as well as certain water rights. At the time, the town possessed a post office, grist mill, and numerous other small businesses and stores. The colony specifically issued an appeal for a "good country newspaper, hardware store, bank, as well as farmers and other "industrious people." It specifically discouraged whiskey saloons or gambling halls.

The first drawing of lots for the colony was held in December 1872, at which time one-fifth of the lots were disbursed. The colony quickly resulted in the addition of several hundred new residents to the town, as well the erection of many new buildings. Among the recipients of lots in the drawing was Franklin Avery, who would later become one of the most prominent citizens of the town, as well as Jacob Welch, would become one of the most prominent merchants. Both received lots along College Avenue, which would become the principal thoroughfare in the new expanded town plan.
