= Bellvue, Colorado =

Unincorporated community in Larimer County, Colorado, United States

- unincorporated community
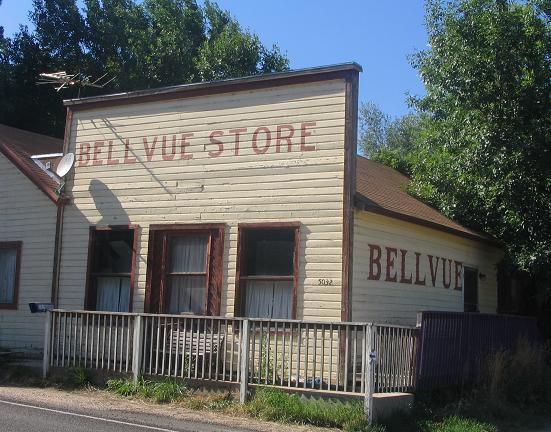

- Location of Bellvue, Colorado. Bellvue (Colorado)
- Coordinates: 40°37′35″N 105°10′18″W
- Country: United States
- State: Colorado
- County: Larimer

Government
  - Type: unincorporated community
  - Body: Larimer County
- Elevation: 5,131 ft (1,564 m)
- Time zone: UTC−07:00 (MST)
  - Summer (DST): UTC−06:00 (MDT)
- ZIP Code: 80512
- GNIS pop ID: 177195

Bellvue is an unincorporated community and U.S. Post Office in Larimer County, Colorado. It is a small agricultural community located in Pleasant Valley, a narrow valley just northwest of Fort Collins near the mouth of the Poudre Canyon between the Dakota Hogback ridge and the foothills of the Rocky Mountains. The ZIP Code of the Bellvue Post Office is 80512.

== Description ==
The community is a lush area on the south side of the Cache la Poudre River, at the mouth of Rist Canyon, concealed from the open Colorado Piedmont near Fort Collins and LaPorte by the Bellvue Dome, also known as "Goat Hill". The valley formerly stretched southward between the hogback and foothills into the area now inundated by Horsetooth Reservoir. The main agriculture in the valley is cultivation of hay and other crops, as well as cattle and horse ranches. The Colorado Division of Wildlife maintains a large trout hatchery in the valley just north of the Bellvue town site.

== History ==
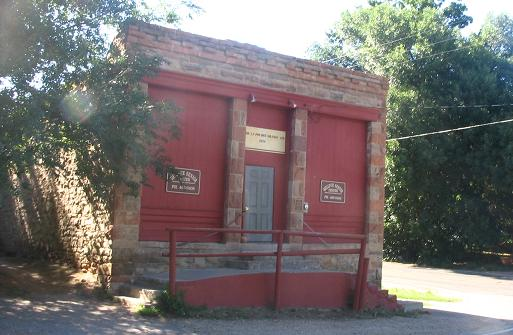
The old Bellvue General Store, now the meeting house for Cache la Poudre Grange, Chapter 456 and a community center.

Paleoindian sites nearby, including a large bison kill site along the Poudre River, indicate human habitation dating back over 10,000 years. In the early 19th century, the area was inhabited by bands of Arapaho, who clashed regularly in small skirmishes with bands of the Ute tribe who inhabited the mountains. Archaeological remains of teepee rings can be found in the surrounding foothills.

The first white settlers arrived in the valley soon after Antoine Janis became the first white settler in northern Colorado in 1858. The farm and pasture lands were squatted upon in the two years that followed, so that most was claimed by G.R. Sanderson, one of these first settlers, who built the first irrigation ditch in the county in June 1860. The ditch was the second one constructed in northern Colorado. Sanderson sold his claim to J.H. Yeager in 1864, and the ditch came to be known as the Yeager ditch.

Another early settler, Samuel Bingham, settled on the west slope of Bingham Hill in 1860. In 1860, Abner Loomis, who was also an early prominent resident of Fort Collins, settled on a ranch in the valley. Other early settlers in the 1860s included Benjamin T. Whedbee, Perry J. Bosworth, C.W. Harrington, and Louis Blackstock.

In 1873, Jacob Flowers arrived in the valley and set up a homestead on a parcel of land he purchased from Joseph Mason. Flowers had migrated westward from Ohio and Missouri after the Civil War and had settled temporarily in Greeley in 1872. The following year, Flowers followed the Poudre upstream and founded the town of "Bellevue" later that year (the name was later shortened).

The area was considered desirable by the Union Pacific Railroad because of the many stone quarries in the area near the town of Stout (now flooded by Horsetooth Reservoir). The influx of railroad workers to work the quarries prompted Flowers to open a general store, saloon, barber shop, and post office. In 1880 he built a one-story sandstone structure to house his business. The Bellvue Post Office opened in the building on June 24, 1884. The building served as the local general store and post office up through the middle 20th century, when it became the meeting house of Cache la Poudre Grange, Chapter 456 of the Colorado State grange, a designation for which it is now commonly known.

Flowers also constructed a track and bandstand south of town that was used for horse racing, community celebrations, traveling medicine shows, and dog and pony shows.

=== Pleasant Valley School ===
- Pleasant Valley School
- U.S. National Register of Historic Places
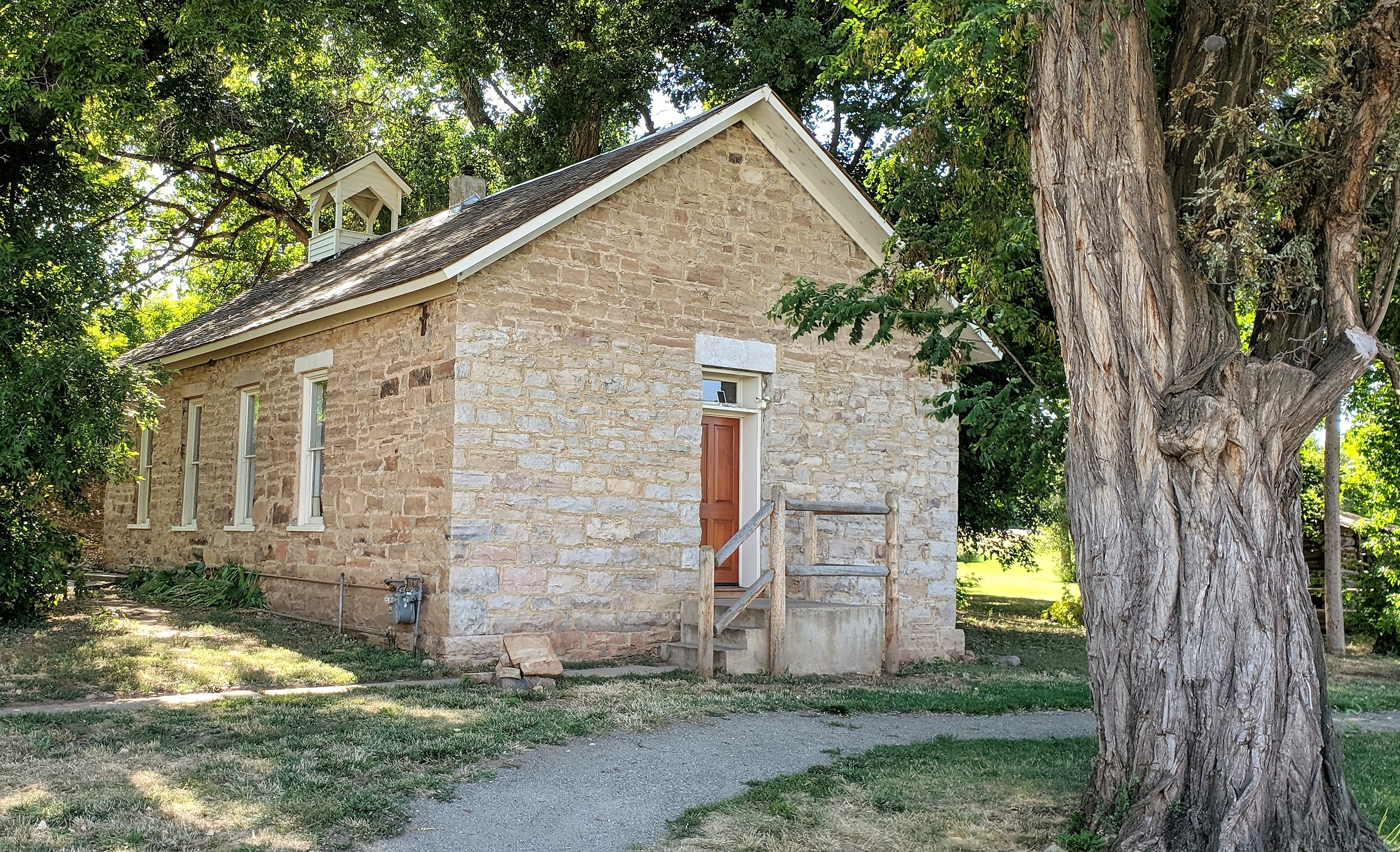
- Built: 1879
- Architectural style: rural schoolhouse
- MPS: Rural School Buildings in Colorado MPS
- NRHP reference No.: 03001008
- Added to NRHP: October 11, 2003

Pleasant Valley School is a rural one-room schoolhouse built from local sandstone in 1879 and listed on the National Register of Historic Places in 2003. In the 1930s, it was used as a residence for farm staff and electricity, plumbing, and a new hardwood floor were installed. It was renovated again in 2012 to best represent the original schoolhouse, though the belfry and bell were donated to the nearby Bellvue's Church of Christ. It was deemed architecturally significant as one of the county's few surviving one-room stone schoolhouses as well as its association with the educational history of Larimer County between the years 1879-1913, particularly the influence of consolidating students from smaller rural schools to improve the quality of education.

== See also ==
- Fort Collins, CO Metropolitan Statistical Area
- Front Range Urban Corridor
