= Goat Hill (Larimer County, Colorado) =

Mountain in Larimer County, Colorado, United States

- Bellvue Dome
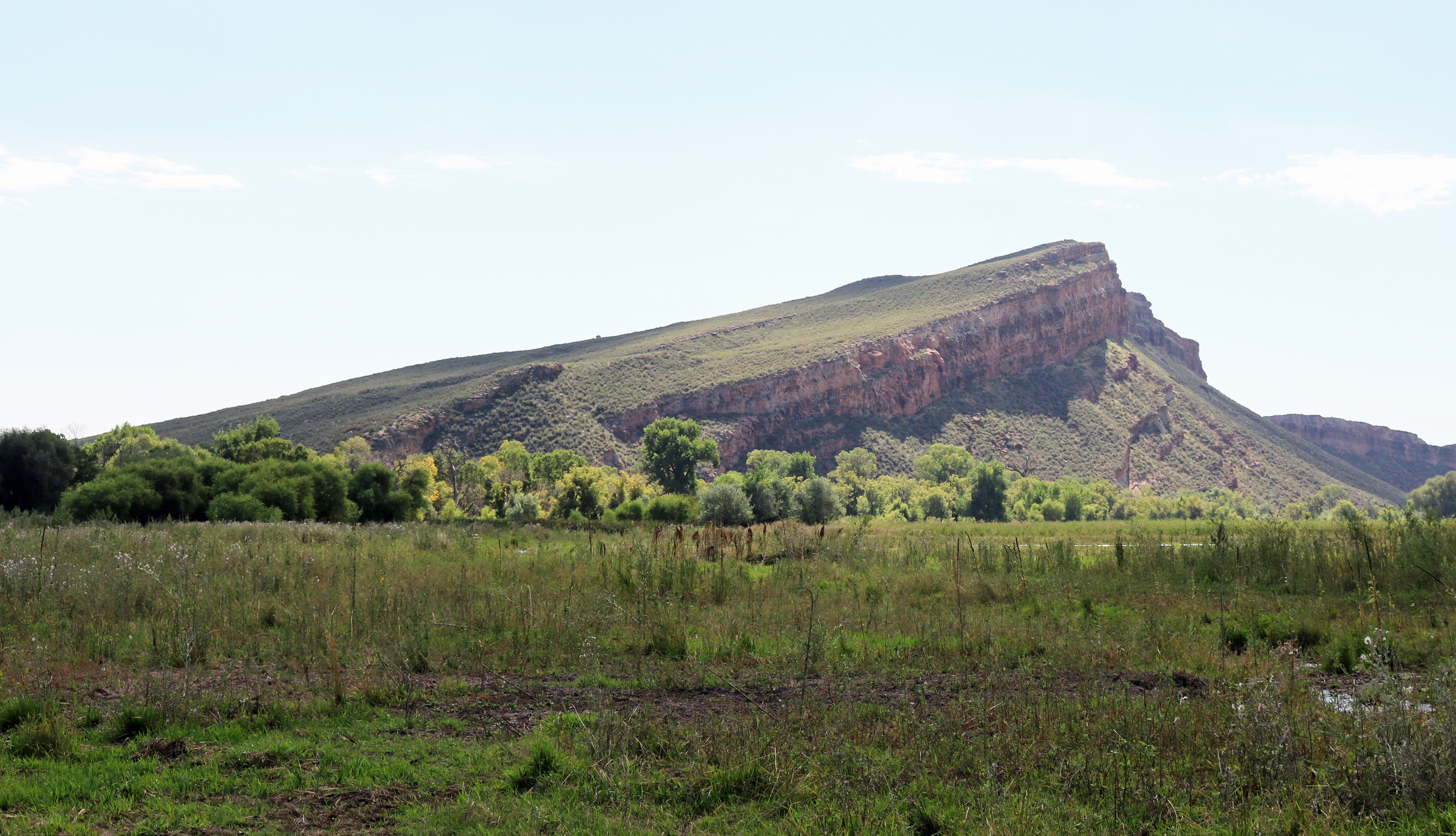
- The dome as seen from the north northwest.

Highest point
- Elevation: 1,708 m (5,604 ft)
- Coordinates: 40°38′33″N 105°10′12″W

Geography
- Location within Colorado
- Location: Larimer County, Colorado
- Parent range: Front Range
- Topo map(s): USGS; Laporte

Goat Hill—also called Bellvue Dome—is an anticline in Larimer County, Colorado near Bellvue.

The dome has a gradual slope on its east side, but its west side is an almost-vertical cliff that hangs over the Cache la Poudre River that passes directly below. The mountain was formed as sedimentary rock was uplifted and folded during the Laramide orogeny.

== Access ==
The mountain itself is on property owned by the Bureau of Land Management, but it's surrounded by private land, so access is difficult or impossible without permission from the adjacent property owners.

Goat Hill is prominently seen by motorists driving south on Highway 287. One can see the mountain in profile, with the slope on the left and the cliff on the right, before the highway turns east towards Fort Collins.

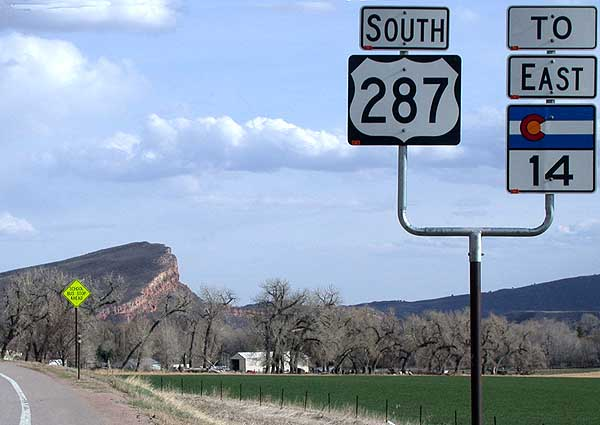
The dome from Highway 287.
