= Jacob Flowers =

Jacob Flowers was an early white 19th century settler in Larimer County, Colorado. He was the founder of the town of Bellvue northwest of Fort Collins.

== Biography ==
Prior to the American Civil War, Flowers owned and operated three river boats along the Ohio River carrying passengers between Marietta, Ohio and St. Louis, Missouri. After two of his boats were destroyed in a sudden storm, he took the remaining boat and sailed down the Ohio to St. Louis, then up the Missouri River to Kansas City, Kansas, where he settled with his family in Wyandotte (now part of Kansas City). In 1873 he organized the Wyandotte Colony, a party of settlers, and led them west to the Colorado Territory to settle at the Union Colony at Greeley, which had been founded three years early as a religiously-oriented agricultural cooperative.

Flowers was not contented at the Union Colony, however, and he relocated later that year upstream on the Cache la Poudre River to just west of Fort Collins, in an area just west of the Dakota Hogback known as Pleasant Valley. The valley had been settled by white homesteaders starting in 1860, and the area just south of the town near Stout (under present-day Horsetooth Reservoir) was the location of stone quarries developed by the Union Pacific Railroad. Flowers established and platted the town of Bellvue in the valley. In 1880, Flowers founded a general store in Bellvue to cater to the quarry workers and their families. He built a one-story sandstone building to house a general store. The building, which still stands, later became the local meeting of the Grange in the 20th century and today is known as the "Bellvue Grange". On June 24, 1884, he opened the first post office in Bellvue at his store. Flowers also built a horse racing track and grandstand for community gathers, dog and pony shows, and traveling medicine shows. He developed and garden and raised pigs for unfortunate families of quarry workers, a generosity that earned him the name "Uncle Jacob" in the local press during his lifetime.

He also surveyed a road through the foothills west of Bellvue south of Rist Canyon. The road was widely used for passage along the south bank of the Poudre River, as well as to access the timber in the foothills. The road was eventually extended over Lulu Pass and became known as the Flowers Road. It fell into disuse after the construction of present-day State Highway 14 through the Poudre Canyon. The road is sporadically marked as a foot trail through the foothills in the Roosevelt National Forest.
