= Union Colony of Colorado =

The Union Colony of Colorado (also called the Greeley Colony and The Union Temperance Colony) was a 19th-century private enterprise formed to promote agricultural settlements in the South Platte River valley in the Colorado Territory. Organization of the colony began in October 1869 by Nathan Meeker in order to establish a religiously-oriented utopian community of "high moral standards". The colony was founded in March 1870 at the site of present-day Greeley, Colorado. Union Colony was financially backed and promoted by New York Tribune editor, Horace Greeley, a prominent advocate of the settlement of the American West. The homesteaded colony greatly advanced irrigation usage in present-day northern Colorado, demonstrating the viability of cultivation at a time when agriculture was emerging as a rival to mining as the principal basis for the territorial economy.

== Background ==
Horace Greeley had journeyed west in 1859 at the height of the Colorado Gold Rush, going from Denver to Fort Laramie via the Overland Stage Line before continuing on to California. Greeley's route took him up the valleys of the South Platte and Cache la Poudre near the eventual location of the colony.

== History ==
In 1869 Greeley sent Meeker, then employed as the agricultural editor of the Tribune, to the Colorado Territory to seek out a location for a colony to promote settlement in the West. Meeker returned to New York City in the autumn of 1869, reporting that the South Platte Valley presented a good opportunity for the colony. In October, Meeker began organizing the enterprise, and on December 14, 1869, he placed an advertisement in the Tribune calling for volunteers to join him in the new venture. Meeker's advertisement specifically sought volunteers of high moral standards, who were literate and adherents to the tenets of the Temperance movements. The cost of membership for those accepted to the colony was set at $160. Of the more than 3000 people who responded, Meeker selected 700 applications as prospective colonists, ninety of whom later backed out.

Former Union general Robert Alexander Cameron served as the first vice president and later president of the colony, as well as the colony's superintendent. Cameron would also become president of the Fort Collins colony in 1872.

== Establishment ==
With the collected membership fees, Meeker journeyed west in the Spring of 1870 with two other officers. They purchased a tract of land in Weld County, near the confluence of the Cache la Poudre and South Platte Rivers and founded the settlement. Initially, the colony thrived and expanded, attracting other homesteaders to the area. The religious nature of the colony was not agreeable to all the settlers, however, so a portion of them spread out to other nearby lands in the area. Jacob Flowers, for example, was one of these. In 1872, the success of the colony inspired some of its officers to found another colony upstream on the Poudre River at Fort Collins. The Town of Greeley was incorporated on November 15, 1885.

== Notoriety ==
During the 1870s, the colony became known for its heavy use of irrigation, with one visitor reporting that nearly every person in the cooperative was involved in the maintaining of at least one irrigation ditch. Meeker was killed by Utes at the "Meeker Massacre" in western Colorado in 1879. The irrigation system built by the Colony remains an important part of the area today, although growing urbanization threatens more and more of the productive croplands the irrigation systems allowed to be utilized.

== Significance and legacy ==
The Colony's influence is recognized in the region's history. Greeley remained a dry municipality until 1972. As a result, several nearby towns grew more rapidly as a source of liquor; and at least two small towns, Rosedale, and Garden City, were established and incorporated largely to allow saloons, bars, and liquor stores to feed the demand of nearby University of Northern Colorado students and faculty.

Fire protection services for the City of Greeley are today provided by the "Union Colony Fire Rescue Authority". A major city building complex is located at the "Union Colony Civic Center."

== Notable people ==
- Annie Maria V. Green
