= Camp Collins =

Former US Army outpost in Colorado

Coordinates: 40.63°N 105.14°W

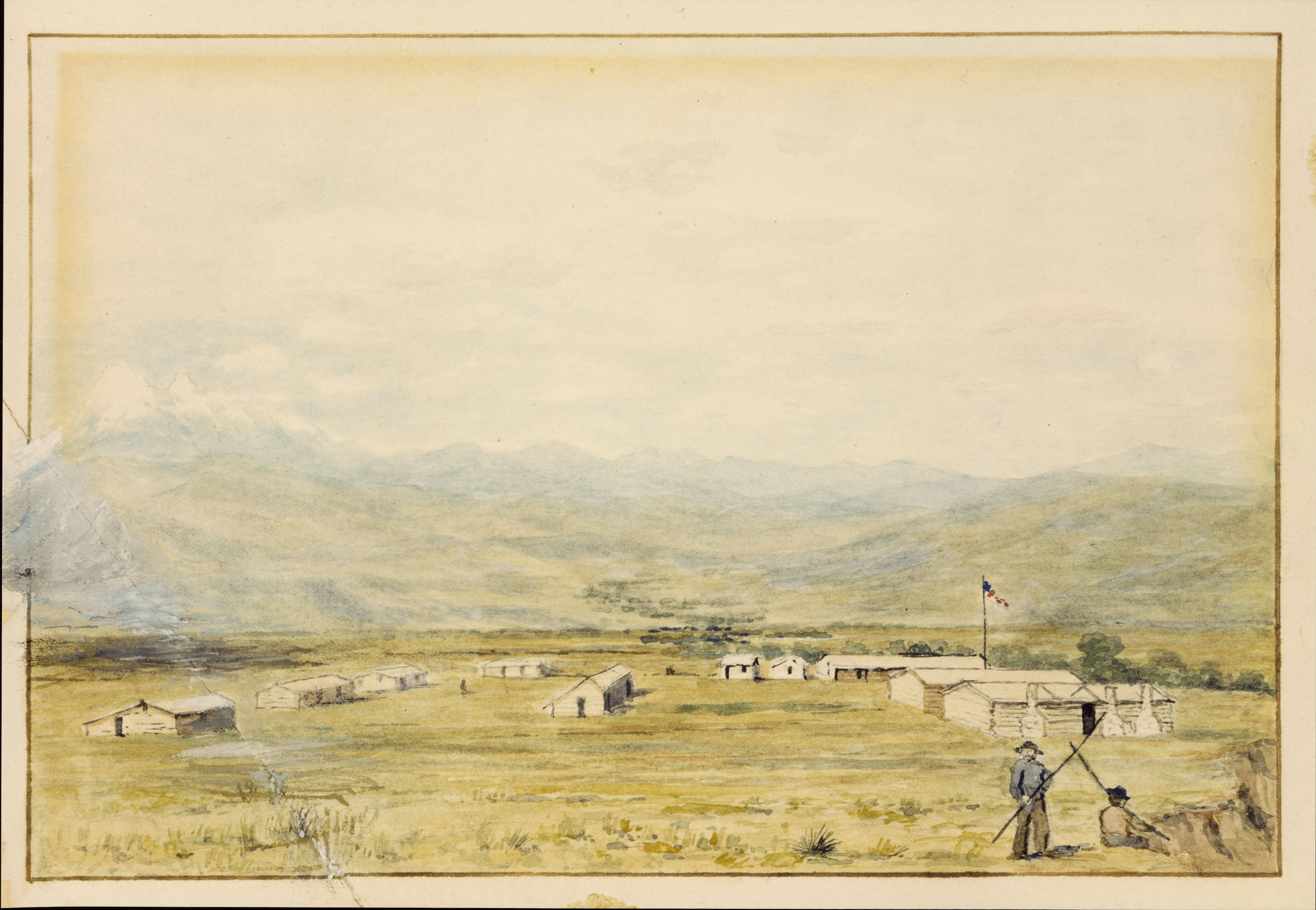
Painting depicting the camp in 1865

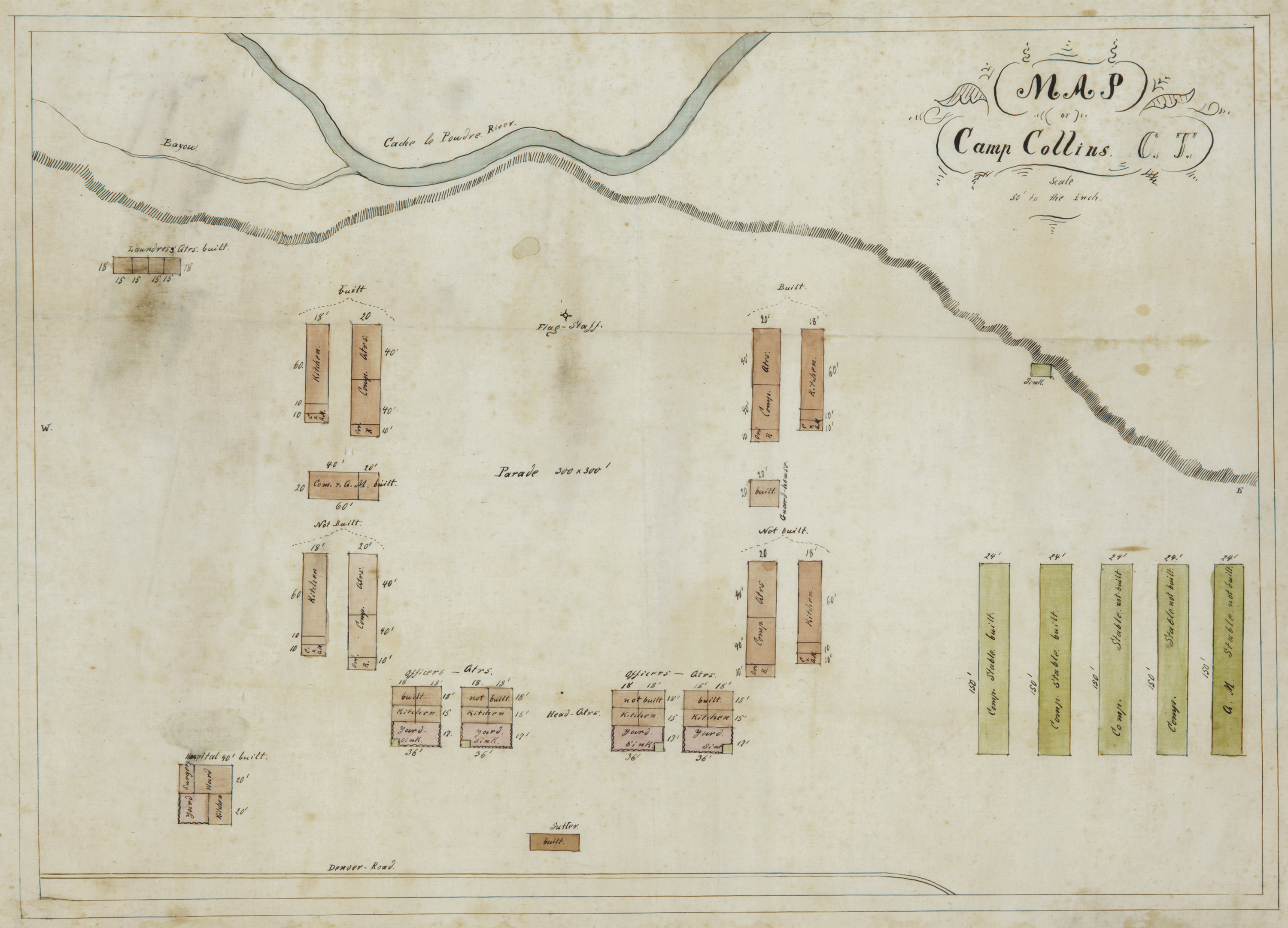
Plan of Camp Collins

Camp Collins (also known as the Fort Collins Military Reservation) was a 19th-century outpost of the United States Army in the Colorado Territory. The fort was commissioned in the summer of 1862 to protect the Overland Trail from attacks by Native Americans in a conflict that later became known as the Colorado War. Located along the Cache la Poudre River in Larimer County, it was relocated from its initial location near Laporte after a devastating flood. Its second location downstream on the Poudre was used until 1866 and became the nucleus around which the City of Fort Collins was founded.

== History ==
=== Laporte location (1862–1864) ===
The camp was commissioned on July 22, 1862, and later named for Lt. Col. William O. Collins, colonel of the 11th Ohio Cavalry and the commandant of Fort Laramie, the headquarters of the U.S. Army's West Sub-district of the District of Nebraska. The initial camp at Laporte was constructed and manned by Company B, 9th Kansas Cavalry. The mission of the fort was to protect the emigrant trains and Overland Stage lines on the Overland Trail from the growing hostile attacks of the Plains Indians. The growing hostility of the Lakota to white encroachment further north had forced the temporary relocation of the Emigrant Trail from the North Platte River to the South Platte valley. Although relations with the Arapaho and Cheyenne in the vicinity of the camp were largely peaceful, the hostility of the Pawnee and other tribes on the Colorado Eastern Plains towards white settlement prompted the Army to establish the fort as a precautionary measure to protect the trail.

The camp was founded near the existing settlement of Laporte (originally Colona) that had been founded four years earlier in 1858 by Antoine Janis and other homesteaders from Fort Laramie. Although the region was not part of the Colorado Gold Rush that erupted the following year, the fertile lands of the Colorado Piedmont along the Poudre attracted a growing number of homesteaders in the mid-1860s. The Arapaho continued to live in villages along the Poudre near the mountains, coexisting peacefully with the settlers, despite the loss of their hunting grounds on the eastern plains in 1861 by treaty with the U.S. government.

During its first two years, the fort remained a somewhat peaceful outpost. The fort saw little direct action during its commission and was never stockaded with walls. In the fall of 1862, the 9th Kansas Cavalry was relieved by a detachment of the 1st Colorado Volunteer Cavalry under Captain David L. Hardy. The following July 1863, Hardy and Company M left the fort to pursue hostile Utes in the mountains, leaving the camp in control of Company B of the 1st Colorado under Lt. George W. Hawkins. In April 1864, Company B was ordered to Camp Sanborn to bolster the garrison there, leaving a void that was filled in mid-May 1864 by the arrival of Company F of the 11th Ohio Cavalry, commanded by William H. Evans.

The most significant event its history occurred within a month after the arrival of the 11th Ohio. The event was not a battle but the flooding on the Poudre River, swollen from spring snow melt, in early June 1864. The flood destroyed the camp nearly completely, with many of the soldiers barely escaping with their lives.

=== Poudre location (1864–1867) ===
The obvious unsuitability of the site for future use prompted Evans to order Lieutenant Joseph Hannah to begin scouting for an alternative site. Joseph Mason, a local settler, came forth with a proposal for a new site adjacent to his own claim four miles downstream on the Poudre, on a section of high ground on the south bank of the river. The site offered protection from flooding, had a prominent viewshed of the terrain, and was directly on the "Denver Road", the section of the Overland Trail through the county. The site offered the additional benefit of being removed from the saloons and other temptations in Laporte.

On August 20, 1864, Colonel Collins issued Special Order No. 1 relocating the camp to the site suggested by Mason. The new post, by then known as "Fort Collins", was fully occupied by October 22 and the Laporte site was completely abandoned. The new site saw as little direct action as the original site, but its proximity to the growing community of new homesteaders, as well as its location on the Denver Road, made it increasingly the center of local transportation and commerce.

The site itself is in present-day Old Town in Fort Collins, between Jefferson Street (the old Denver Road) and the Poudre River. The actual military reservation encompassed an expansive territory that stretches several miles south of the Poudre, but the actual campgrounds were confined to a small area in present-day Old Town. The 300 foot square parade ground, standard for forts of its type, was centered at the present intersection of Willow and Linden Streets, approximately one block from the river. The site included the standard configuration of barracks and mess halls for enlisted men, an officer's quarters, camp headquarters, guard houses, storehouses, and stables. The buildings were of log construction typically for that era and region. A city-authorized sign near the intersection provides a guide to the location of the original camp buildings, none of which survive today.

The first commercial buildings were built on the southwest side of the Denver Road (Jefferson Street), including the two-story inn owned by early settler "Auntie" Elizabeth Stone. The structure was relocated in the 20th century to the grounds of the Fort Collins Museum.

In September 1866 the post was completely abandoned and was officially decommissioned the following year by order of General William T. Sherman.

=== Site of the town of Fort Collins ===
Almost immediately, local business owners and residents stepped into the vacuum left by the abandonment, claiming the land for commercial purposes, despite a clerical error by the Army that kept the land officially in government hands until 1872. By 1869, Stone and Henry C. Peterson constructed the first flour mill on the south bank of the Poudre, as well as 1.5-mile (2.5 km) mill race to supply water power. The first white child in Fort Collins, Agnes Mason, was born in the former camp headquarters on October 31, 1867. In 1870 the Colorado Territorial Legislature designated the fledgling town as the location for the Agricultural College (present-day Colorado State University).

The military reservation was officially relinquished on May 15, 1872, by presidential order, officially opening the land to settlement claims. The townsite of Fort Collins was officially platted on the former site of the camp in January 1873. The original plat includes all the "tilted" streets in present-day Old Town north of Mountain Avenue and east of College Avenue. The town grew rapidly as an agricultural center in the 1870s, and the town plat was rapidly expanded by the founding of the Fort Collins Agricultural Colony in 1873.
