= Fort Caspar =

- Fort Caspar and Boundary Increase
- U.S. National Register of Historic Places
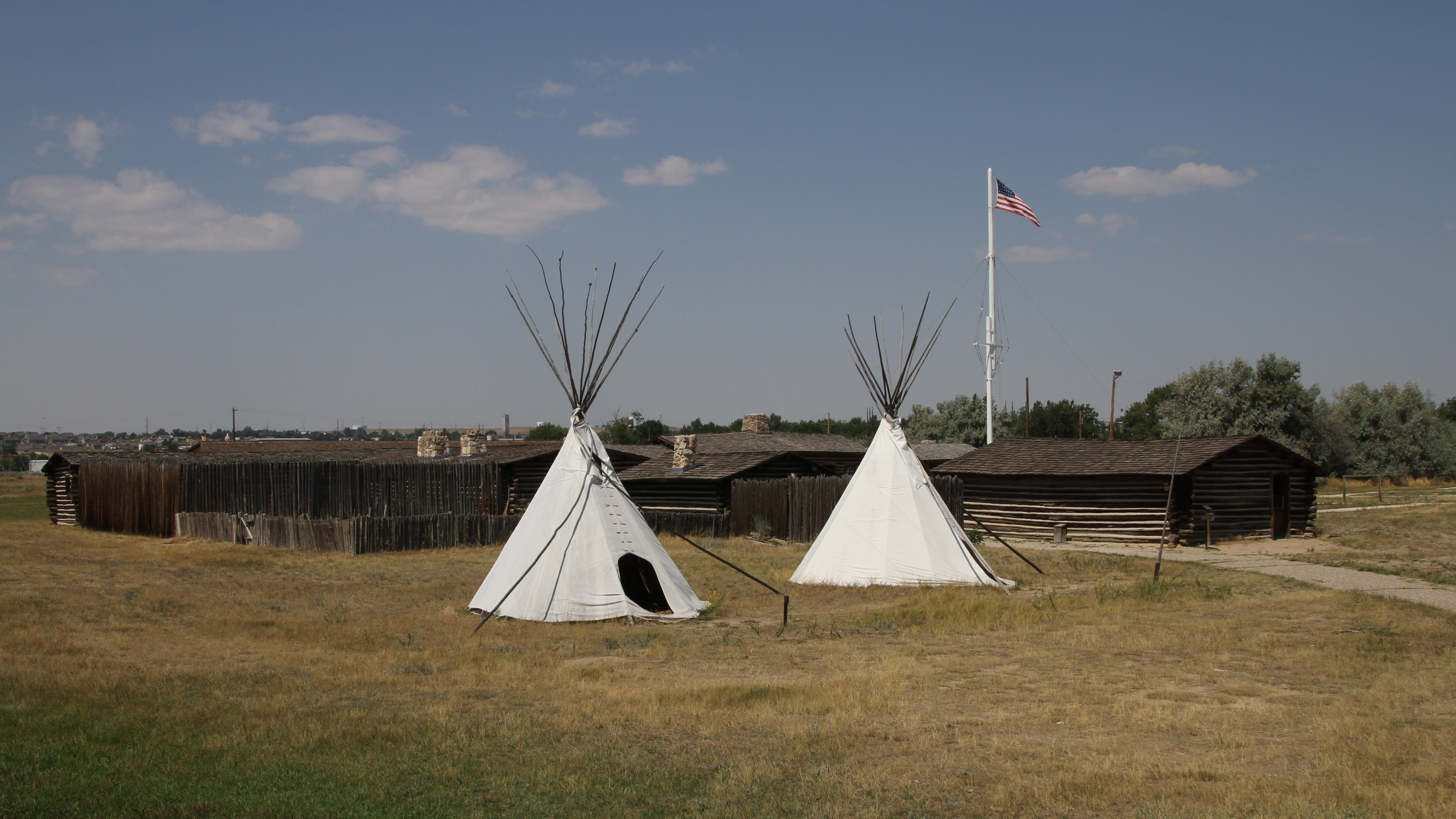
- Reconstructed buildings at the site of Fort Caspar
- Interactive map of Fort Caspar and Boundary Increase
- Location: 14 Fort Caspar Rd. Casper, Wyoming 82604
- Coordinates: 42°50′12″N 106°22′16″W
- Architect: Louis Guinard
- NRHP reference No.: 71000887; 76002282
- Added to NRHP: August 12, 1971; July 19, 1976

Fort Caspar was a military post of the United States Army in present-day Wyoming, named after 2nd Lieutenant Caspar Collins, a U.S. Army officer who was killed in the 1865 Battle of the Platte Bridge Station against the Lakota and Cheyenne. Founded in 1859 along the banks of the North Platte River as a trading post and toll bridge on the Oregon Trail, the post was later taken over by the Army and named Platte Bridge Station to protect emigrants and the telegraph line against raids from Lakota and Cheyenne in the ongoing wars between those nations and the United States. The site of the fort, near the intersection of 13th Street and Wyoming Boulevard in Casper, Wyoming, is listed in the National Register of Historic Places and is now owned and operated by the City of Casper as the Fort Caspar Museum and Historic Site.

== History ==
The area where Platte Bridge Station was located had been the site of various temporary Army encampments over a period of years before the establishment of the fort, or "station" itself. The fort was located on the south side of the North Platte, near the western edge of present-day Casper, at one several local points where the Emigrant Trail crossed from the south side to the north side of the river. In 1847, during the first Mormon wagon train to present-day Utah, Brigham Young commissioned a ferry at the site for later emigrants. The ferry consisted of cottonwood dugout canoes and planking for a deck, with two oars and a rudder. On June 19, Young named nine men to remain to operate the ferry while the remainder of the party continued the journey westward. A group of Mormons returned to the site each summer between 1847 and 1852 to operate the ferry. The ferry was moved to a different spot on the North Platte in North Casper in 1849. It was eventually replaced with a rope-and-pulley system that could make the crossing in five minutes.

In following years, trader John Baptiste Richard established a trading post several miles downriver of the crossing. The U.S. Army established its first presence in the area in 1855, erecting Fort Clay near Richard's trading post. In 1859, when the site was part of the Nebraska Territory, Louis Guinard built a competing bridge at the trading post, called the Platte Bridge Station, at the site of the old Mormon Ferry crossing. From 1860 to 1861, the Pony Express operated a station at the site.

By the middle 1860s, the increasing presence of emigrants and other white settlers in the region began to cause friction with the Lakota and Cheyenne. In response, and partly to protect the new telegraph line, the Army began increasing its presence in the region in 1861 by sending a detachment to guard Guinard's bridge. Many of these troops, who created a series of "stations" along the Oregon trail, were from various state units raised during the Civil War. In 1862 the Army used the buildings at Platte Bridge station while building and occupying Ft. Caspar.

Guinard, a naturalized U.S. citizen, born in Quebec around 1820 or 1821 had hired his nephew of the same name - Louis P. Guinard, also born in Quebec in 1840 - to come and help build this bridge. Louis P. came and worked for his uncle about three years, becoming a naturalized U.S. citizen in 1863. He worked on the actual building of the bridge as well as keeping his uncle's financial records. Louis Guinard the uncle, fell from the bridge on June 6, 1865 and drowned, leaving the property to his nephew Louis P. Guinard, who took possession on July 15 of 1865. The will was discovered in 1866 and Louis P Guinard stated that he was advised by Major Bullock, sutler at Ft. Laramie, that the will left him as sole owner of the property and that he should remain and hold possession of it. The U.S. troops occupied Guinard's buildings for three years during the Civil War. Louis P. Guinard stated that one of the officers promised him $1000 for use of the said buildings but he never received any payment. The bridge was later destroyed by Indians when the troops left in 1865, and with hundreds of Indians appearing on the opposite bank of the river, Guinard felt he had no choice but to leave for the protection of himself and his family. They had gone no more than 4 or 5 miles before he could tell from the smoke columns that the Indians were burning everything. Guinard had left his will in the safekeeping of Major Bullock at Ft. Laramie, having no way at the time to get it probated or secured in a bank. He later filed claim to be compensated for Indian depredations but Major Bullock told him the will was lost or destroyed. Unable to produce the will, the case dragged on in the courts for more than 25 years before it was finally abandoned and Guinard was never compensated for his losses.

=== Battle of the Platte Bridge Station ===
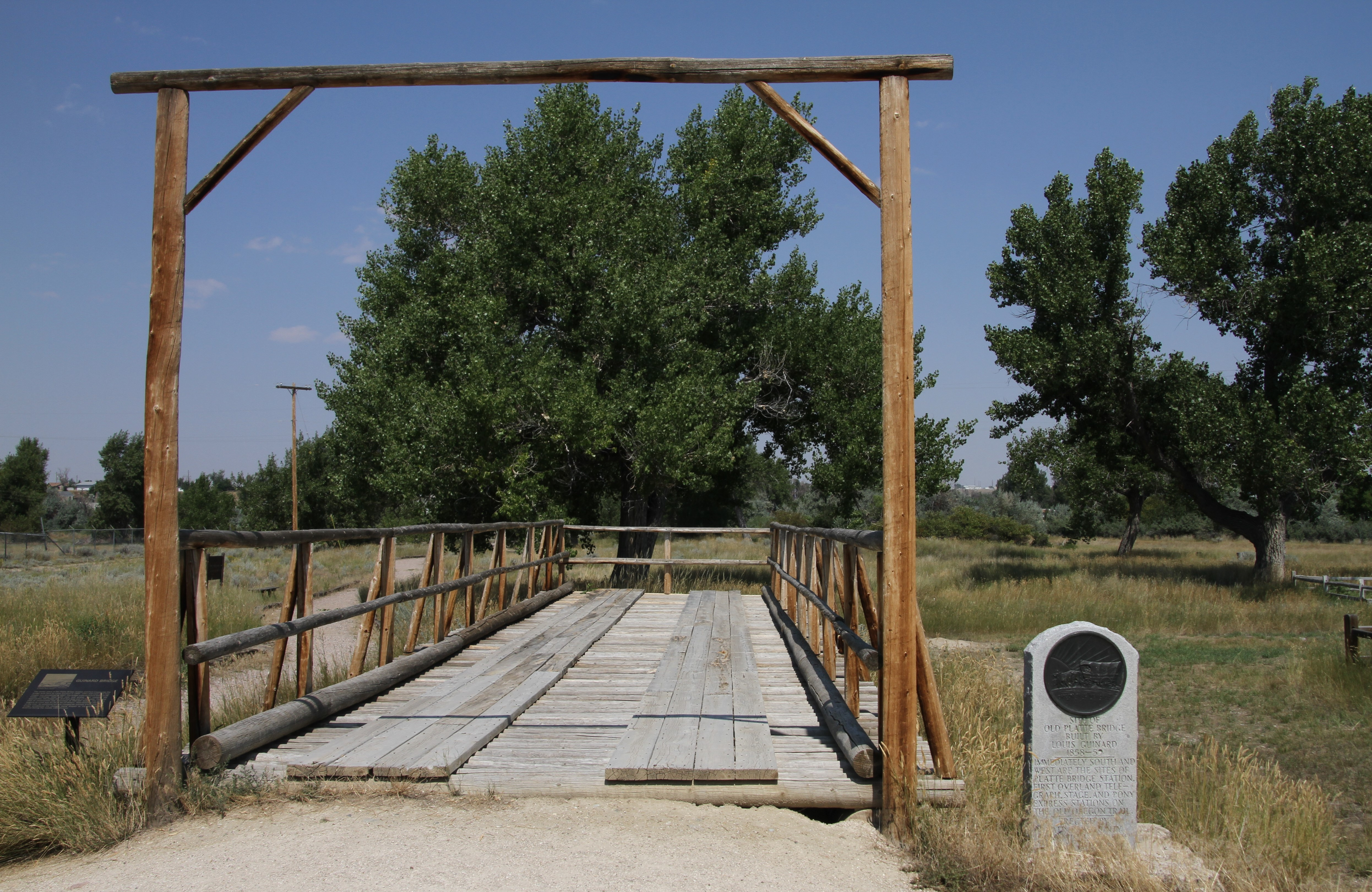
Reconstructed Platte Bridge

In July 1865, accompanied by survivors of the Sand Creek Massacre which occurred the previous November as part of the Colorado War, a party of several thousand Cheyenne and Sioux approached Platte Bridge Station from the north intending to attack the soldiers camped there and destroy the 1,000-foot-long (300 m) bridge. They had previously scouted the area and selected it because the soldiers there were not in the small trading post stockade of 14-foot pine logs but camped in tents. Initially only a small party of Indians showed themselves to the troops, the remainder of the Indians remaining concealed. By the afternoon of July 25, however, when a large raiding party had driven off a number of horses and forced the pursuing cavalry troopers to expend much ammunition, the station had permanent structures and a mountain howitzer of the 11th Ohio Cavalry covered the approaches to the bridge.

Late that night a detachment of 14 men of Company I, 3rd U.S. Volunteer Infantry led by Capt. Adam Smith Leib, escorted by 1st Lt. Henry C. Bretney and six (some accounts say 10) troopers of Company G, 11th Ohio Volunteer Cavalry, arrived from Sweetwater Station en route to Fort Laramie for supplies and a long-overdue payroll. They found the station on 50% guard duty and molding bullets. Leib advised the station commander, Major Martin Anderson of the 11th Kansas Cavalry, that he had earlier passed a small train of five empty mule-drawn wagons returning from Sweetwater to Laramie, 14 teamsters escorted by 11 enlisted men of the 11th Kansas. Knowing that the train was due to come in the next morning, the officers at the post discussed sending out a relief force to drive off the Cheyenne and Lakota warriors, so that the wagon train could come safely in. Leib and Bretney suggested an immediate march but Anderson decided to wait for daylight. Bretney, who had succeeded to command of Company G on February 13 when its captain, Levi M. Rinehart, had been accidentally killed by a drunken trooper during a skirmish, was not on good terms with Anderson. On his arrival at Platte Bridge on July 16, the Kansan had replaced Bretney as post commander and ordered Company G to relocate to Sweetwater Station, escorting the same wagon train now returning from there. In addition, the 11th Kansas Cavalry was due to march to Fort Kearney on or about August 1 to muster out of service.

After reveille, all four of Anderson's officers declined to lead the relief force and some placed themselves on the sick list to avoid the duty. 20-year-old 2nd Lt. Caspar W. Collins of Company G 11th Ohio Volunteer Cavalry, en route back to his company farther west from a remount detail at Fort Laramie, had arrived the afternoon before with the mail ambulance and was ordered by Anderson to lead the relief. Bretney had no authority to countermand the order but advised Collins to refuse it. Instead Collins borrowed Bretney's pistols and was given a mount from the regimental band. Among those leading the Indian warriors were Red Cloud and the famed warrior Roman Nose. George Bent, the half Cheyenne son of William Bent who survived the Sand Creek Massacre, participated in the battle as a Cheyenne warrior, and later wrote about it in his letters.

At dawn numerous Indians were observed by sentinels on the surrounding hills observing the station. At 7:00 a.m. a larger force forded the river east of the station and rode just out of rifle range, taunting the garrison. Collins and a small detachment of 25 men of the 11th Kansas crossed the Platte Bridge at a walk, then formed into a column of fours and rode west along the north bank at a trot to drive off any hostile Indians. Behind him, the contingent of the 3rd U.S.V.I. and its 11th Ohio Volunteer Cavalry escort crossed the bridge on foot as a support force for Collins, forming a skirmish line when they observed several hundred Cheyenne emerge from the sand hills and gulleys between themselves and Collins.

The Indians had concealed large bands of warriors near the bridge and over the crest of the hills, possibly as many as a thousand Lakota, Cheyenne and Arapaho. Collins wheeled his detachment into two lines and charged the first group to emerge, only to find himself heavily outnumbered. He then ordered a retreat to the bridge through the Cheyenne to his rear as yet another force, this of Lakota, attempted to rush the bridge. The skirmish line at the bridge held the Lakota at bay with volley fire until 20 of the 26 troopers, all wounded to some extent, fought their way through. Five were killed, including Collins, who was wounded in the hip and shot in the forehead with an arrow while trying to aid a wounded soldier. The battle lasted only a few minutes, with Bent claiming that the Lakota and Cheyenne suffered only a few casualties.

Bretney in a rage returned to the stockade and accused the Kansas officers of cowardice when Anderson refused to allow a larger force and the howitzer to attempt another relief. Anderson placed Bretney under arrest and turned over the post's defenses to Leib, who had the garrison throw up an embrasure and dig rifle pits to protect the howitzer at the south end of the bridge. During the morning the attacking force destroyed a thousand feet of telegraph wire on the line to Fort Laramie before Anderson thought to request reinforcements, then drove off the detail sent to repair it, killing another trooper.

The wagon train, commanded by Sergeant Amos J. Custard, was attacked approximately five miles to the west, within sight of the station, at around 11:00 a.m. According to the Indians the battle lasted about half an hour with one person escaping, a teamster, 22 troopers killed along with 8 Indian warriors. Many Indian warriors were wounded. The Indians, as was their custom, took no prisoners. However Army accounts state that the wagons were forced into a hollow where they held out for four hours, using fire from Spencer rifles to repel assaults until a large group closed on foot and overwhelmed the defenders, killing all. The wagons were burned at approximately 3:00 p.m. Corporal James A. Shrader and four troopers, sent as scouts by Custard to investigate the sound of the howitzer firing, were cut off and pursued by a hundred Cheyenne led by the brother of Roman Nose, Left Hand, who was killed in the running fight. Eventually Shrader and two men made their way on foot into the station. Two Shoshone scouts were paid to take a message requesting reinforcements to the next telegraph station east, but the attacking force broke up before relief arrived.

The battle became known as the Battle of Platte Bridge Station. The battle of the wagon train also became known as the Battle of Red Buttes, although that location was ten miles further to the west. Army fatalities in both actions numbered 27 men of the 11th Kansas Cavalry and Lt. Collins, with at least ten seriously wounded. Historian Robert Utley placed combined Indian casualties in all the July forays around Platte Bridge Station as 60 killed and 130 wounded. The Army officially renamed the post Fort Caspar to honor Collins, using his given name to differentiate the post from an existing fort in Colorado named after Collins' father.

=== Abandonment ===
The fort was abandoned two years later in August 1867, with the garrison moved to Fort Fetterman at Douglas, Wyoming.

=== Restoration and Museum ===
Fort Caspar was partially reconstructed in 1936 using sketches made by Lieutenant Collins in 1863. The fort itself underwent a lot of changes during its occupation, and the current recreation reflects the post in 1863-1865. The City of Casper now operates a museum at the site, which features reconstructed log buildings, including a wooden stockade. The site also includes a replica of the Mormon ferry that was operated there between 1847 and 1849, as well as a model of part of the bridge that later replaced the ferry. In early December members of a living history group portraying a company of the 3rd US Infantry host a historical reenactment at the site.
