= 11th Ohio Cavalry Regiment =

- Active: July 31, 1863 – July 14, 1866
- Country: United States of America
- Allegiance: Union
- Branch: Union Army
- Type: Cavalry
- Size: 11 companies
- Part of: Department of Kansas/Department of Missouri, District of Nebraska, West Sub-district
- Engagements: American Indian Wars: South Pass, November 24, 1862; Sweet Water Bridge, April 3, 1863; Mud Springs Station, February 6, 1865; Rush Creek, February 8, 1865; Near Laparelle Creek, February 13, 1865; Fort Marshall, March 28, 1865; Deer Creek Station, April 21, 1865; Camp Marshall, April 23, 1865; Deer Creek, May 23, 1865; St. Mary's Station, May 27, 1865; Elkhorn, May 28, 1865; Near Deer Creek, June 3, 1865; Sage Creek Statiaon, June 8, 1865; Sweet Water Bridge, June 22, 1865; Rock Creek, June 30, 1865; Platte Bridge, July 26, 1865; Powder River, August 20, 1865; Battle of the Tongue River, August 29, 1865

Commanders
- Notable commanders: William O. Collins

The 11th Ohio Cavalry Regiment, known in vernacular as the 11th Ohio Cavalry, was a cavalry regiment raised in the name of the governor of Ohio from several counties in southwest Ohio, serving in the Union Army during the American Civil War. The regiment was stationed in the Dakota and Idaho territories on the American frontier to protect travelers and settlers from raids by American Indians.

== Service ==
The first four companies of the regiment were originally raised by Lt. Col. William Oliver Collins as the 7th Ohio Cavalry Regiment, but were later to be consolidated into the 6th Ohio Cavalry Regiment posted at Camp Dennison. Collins refused to redesignate his companies, and to settle the political dispute, they were detached from the 6th in February 1862 to be sent west under the command of Collins, a 52-year-old lawyer from Hillsboro and member of the Ohio Senate. On April 4, 1862, the battalion was ordered to St Louis, Missouri, and during the month of May, marched to Fort Laramie in the Idaho Territory, a prominent post along the Oregon Trail. It was permanently detached from the 6th Ohio Cavalry and designated the 1st Ohio Independent Cavalry Battalion. The battalion located its headquarters at Pacific Springs, Nebraska Territory, assigned to protect travelers and interests along the North Platte and Sweetwater Rivers, and then at South Pass, Idaho Territory, to guard the Overland Mail routes from Julesburg, Colorado, to Green River, Wyoming.

In June 1863, Collins recruited four additional companies at Camp Dennison, including 40 former Confederates enlisted from the prisoner-of-war camp at Camp Chase, who were to be sent west to combine in July with the 1st Independent battalion as the 11th Ohio Cavalry. The additional four companies were activated as a defense against Morgan's Raid in July before being sent to Fort Leavenworth, Kansas, at the start of August. Following the burning of Lawrence, Kansas, the battalion was sent after William Quantrill for a short time. Companies E through H arrived at Fort Laramie on October 13. Three more companies (I, K, and L) were formed in 1864 from surplus recruits and men of Companies A through D who did not be re-enlist at the expiration of their enlistments.

Companies A through D mustered out April 1, 1865, along with Collins. He was replaced in command by Lt. Col. Thomas L. Mackey, former captain of Company C. Companies E and K, many members who were "Galvanized Yankees", accompanied the column of Brig. Gen. Patrick Edward Connor on the 1865 Powder River Expedition and saw action in the Battle of the Tongue River. The remaining seven companies mustered out July 14, 1866. They were the last volunteer troops from Ohio in service.

The 11th Ohio Cavalry suffered three officers and 20 enlisted men killed in action, and one officer and 60 enlisted men died from disease.

== Service on the emigrant trails ==
The 11th Ohio Cavalry was assigned to the Department of Kansas (Department of the Missouri after January 30, 1865), District of Nebraska. The battalion and later the regiment were stationed in the Idaho Territory to replace the regular troops who had been posted there before the Civil War. As a result of the military withdrawal, Indian attacks on emigrants intensified. By the time the volunteers arrived at Fort Laramie, most traffic on the trail had dropped off in favor of the more southern Overland Trail that went from Julesburg, Colorado, to the Front Range and through the Laramie Plains to meet the other emigrant trails at Fort Bridger. U.S. mail service also moved to the southern line after the contract was assigned to Ben Holladay's Overland Stage Line in 1861.

Upon arrival at Fort Laramie, the troops were assigned to various posts along the Sweetwater and North Platte Rivers between Nebraska and South Pass. A company was sent immediately to construct Fort Halleck near Elk Mountain on the Overland Trail. After it became the 11th Ohio Cavalry, troops manned Fort Halleck and several outlying satellite posts until they were abandoned in 1866. In 1864, two companies were sent to Camp Collins (named for Lt. Colonel Collins) and later Fort Collins until it, too, was decommissioned in 1866. Collins became commander of the West Subdistrict, District of Nebraska, with his headquarters at Fort Laramie.

On December 31, 1864, the 11th was posted in the West Subdistrict as follows:

- Fort Laramie: four companies
- Camp Collins: two companies
- Fort Halleck: one company
- Fremont Orchard: one company
- Camp Marshall: one company
- Camp Mitchell: one company
- Platte Bridge: one company

On July 26, 1865, a detachment of the 11th Kansas Cavalry posted at Platte Bridge Station near present-day Casper, Wyoming, engaged a large band of Cheyenne and Sioux who intended to destroy the 1,000-foot-long (300 m) bridge and the soldiers posted there to protect it. Lt. Colonel Collin's son Caspar, a 20-year-old second lieutenant en route with the mail escort back to his company farther west, was ordered by Major Martin Anderson of the 11th Kansas Cavalry to lead a relief force of Kansas cavalrymen to escort a small wagon train into the fort after the four officers of the Kansas regiment refused to do so. Collins and 25 Kansas troopers marched into an ambush less than a half mile after crossing the bridge. Most fought their way back to the bridge, held by a 20-man support force of the 11th Ohio and Company I, 3rd U.S. Volunteer Infantry en route to Fort Laramie, but six were cut off and killed, including Collins. The wagon train of 25 troopers and teamsters of the 11th Kansas was surrounded before reaching the bridge, and all but three troopers were killed.

In August, Companies E and K from Fort Laramie accompanied Colonel James H. Kidd's western column of Brigadier General Patrick E. Connor's Powder River Expedition aimed at stopping Sioux, Cheyenne, and Arapaho attacks on the Bozeman Trail. On August 29, the troops attacked an Indian village along the Tongue River. Five soldiers were killed, and seven were wounded compared to 63 killed or wounded Arapaho.

== Notable members ==
Sergeant Charles L. Thomas, Company E - Medal of Honor recipient for heroism during the Powder River Expedition

== Legacy ==
In 1957, the Troopers Drum and Bugle Corps was founded in Casper, Wyoming. Paying homage to Casper's history, director Jim Jones based the Troopers uniforms on the field uniforms of the 11th Ohio Cavalry. To this day, the corps' symbol is a pair of crossed sabers with the number 11 emblazoned above them, the same symbol the 11th Ohio would have used.
