= Annie Maria V. Green =

Pioneer of the Union Colony of Colorado

Annie Maria V. Green and her husband William "Will" M. Green moved from Franklin, Pennsylvania, as pioneers of the Union Colony of Colorado (now known as Greeley, Colorado) in 1870. With their two children, and the addition of two more in Greeley, they were one white American farming family amid the great invasion of the North American West by many eastern U.S. families after the Civil War. Green was incredibly miserable throughout her sixteen years on the Great American Desert. She and her husband Will worked very hard to make their living in the newly established American town, and Green became one of the first published Colorado writers (although she would doubtlessly be resentful to be identified with Colorado.) She documented their struggles and her budding literary and thespian ambitions in her memoir, Sixteen Years on the Great American Desert; Or, The Trials and Triumphs of a Frontier Life.

== Family ==
Annie Maria Green was married to William "Will" M. Green, and had 2 children before moving to Greeley, Colorado. While she lived in Greeley, Colorado, she gave birth to two more children. There is not much known about the identities of her children other than her claim that they became "natural Coloradoans."

== Life in the New Union Colony ==
The Union Colony of Colorado (also known as Greeley, Colorado) was organized as a colony in late 1869 by Nathan Meeker and Horace Greeley as an irrigated farming settlement. Nathan Meeker worked for The New York Tribune at the time as the paper's agricultural editor and posted an ad for the establishment of a new colony in the Territory of Colorado. He used Greeley as an offer to start over and build a new life among "a middle-class community and sought settlers who abstained from alcohol, were literate, and possessed 'high moral standards.' "In April 1870, 144 families traveled westward on the railroad to settle in 'Union Colony.' This new society gained national publicity thorough the support and praise of Horace Greeley with his phrase "Go west, young man." The settler families began building irrigation ditches and creating farming colonies. The Union Colony of Colorado "attracted hard-working, temperate, family oriented people. The colony survived and prospered because it placed emphasis on working together for the benefit of all, particularly by supporting public education and culture, but still allowed for exceptionally hard working and innovative people to become prosperous in their own right."

Green describes life in the early Union Colony as very difficult, and told friends that she regretted moving there. Due to her boredom, she decided to open the colony's first school but after two weeks she reluctantly gave it up to care for an ill friend. On July 4, 1870, Green received a letter from a friend back home asking her if she could join her in Colorado. Green replied to her letter stating that she should be content where she is, and to pray for her unfortunate and unhappy friend (herself). In order to make ends meet in their earliest days in the Union Colony, Annie's husband started a job at a coal mine which required him to be five miles away from his wife. While her husband Will was away, Annie began making and selling bread for people who would come by, but swore her children to secrecy so their father would never find out. This went on for some time until one night while they were eating dinner after Will's return, there was a knock at the door and the man who bought bread earlier had come back to buy more, outing Annie as working behind her husband's back. Will was understanding though, and instead of belittling her, he simply stated that if she thought it was the best option, he would support her efforts to help the family.

== Memoir ==
Annie Maria Green wrote a memoir about her experiences in Greeley, Colorado and some experiences in Fort Collins, Colorado. In her memoir, Sixteen Years on the Great American Desert; Or, The Trials and Triumphs of a Frontier Life, she writes about Greeley, in "a sort of dark-comedy satire on settler hype reminding us once again that farming was much a gamble as mining." Green began writing the memoir as a way to pass the time and ignore her loneliness. As time went on, she found herself writing in it more and more. She began writing everything in the memoir, her poems, songs, various letters she received, and some conversations she had. She documented many notable events in the early Union Colony, most of them unfortunate: floods, tornadoes, deaths in the family, and the ceremony for the late Nathan Meeker and his wife and daughter who were captured during the Meeker Massacre on Colorado's Western Slope in 1879.

The book recounts multiple disasters that occur during Annie and Will's time in the New Union Colony. It begins "with a train wreck on the way out, and moving on to bad weather, locusts, and diverse calamities incidental to farming." She describes the constant struggle to find a way to make money on the side as opposed to completely relying on farming because it was unreliable and there were many obstacles they had to overcome in order to be successful farmers. She states one of her side jobs in her memoir: "the only alternative was to mortgage our grain in order to raise the money." As time goes on in her memoir, Green begins to grow fond of Greeley and the people in it, despite all the hardships she endured. She describes becoming a playwright in order to make ends meet, and founded an amateur acting troupe, the Union Colony Victim Company to stage her play "Ten Years on the Great American Desert" in Barnum Hall. She states in her memoir of 1887 that she is returning to her home in Franklin, Pennsylvania. However, she writes that "Greeley is now a 'handsome little city,' a 'prosperous city' with ' the best of hotel accommodation good theaters,' pure artesian water,' 'electric light,' excellent schools and churches."

== Significance ==
Annie Maria V. Green's memoir about her experiences in the Union Colony of Colorado is vastly different from any other previous writings on the west. Unlike the other writings and propaganda of the Pike's Peak Gold Rush and the California Gold Rush, Green's memoir is a sarcastic lament by an easterner about the challenges U.S. Americans could face moving west. Her memoir revolves around all of the pain, destruction, and lack of success her family faced as a result. She specifically tells her friend in her memoir not to move west because it is all a bunch of propaganda and she is not happy. On top of being a corrective to popular propaganda about the West, her memoir is a unique look into the lives of American women and farmers in the U.S. West after the Civil War.
