= 1st Ohio Independent Cavalry Battalion =

- Active: October, 1861 to July, 1863
- Country: United States
- Allegiance: Union
- Branch: Cavalry
- Engagements: American Civil War: Action at Upper Crossing, Sweetwater, N. T. November 24, 1862; Action at Platte River, N. T. April 17, 1863; Cheyenne Fork July 19, 1863

The 1st Ohio Independent Cavalry Battalion was a battalion of cavalry in the Union Army during the American Civil War. With the addition of a second Battalion its designation changed to that of Regiment, the 11th Ohio Cavalry in July, 1863.

== Service ==
The battalion's organization was commenced on October, 1861. On December 1, 1861, the members of the battalion were consolidated with the 6th Ohio Cavalry, to form 4 companies. The battalion would be formed and trained at Camp Dennison near Cincinnati, Ohio, during the winter of 1861-1862. In February 1862, the battalion was detached from the 6th Ohio Cavalry and was designated as the '1st Ohio Independent Cavalry Battalion'.

Following its formation, it was transferred to the Benton Barracks, Missouri. On April 4, 1862, the battalion boarded the Steamers of Robert Campbell and Sam. Gaty, traveling to Fort Leavenworth, Kansas, arriving a week later. On April 26, the battalion moved to Fort Laramie on the Wyoming Territory on May 30, 1862.

Upon arriving at Fort Laramie, the battalion was assigned to duty at the North Platte and Sweetwater rivers, with the battalion's headquarters near Pacific Springs and the South Pass. The battalion was primarily engaged in guarding Overland Mail routes from Julesburg to the Green River.

In July 1862, the Overland Mail Company opened another route across the Rocky Mountains along the Cherokee Trail. The Battalion's responsibilities were expanded to also guard the mail wagons on this new route, the battalion's headquarters were later relocated to Fort Laramie. During its deployment, it was engaged in skirmishes against Native Americans. The battalion saw action at Upper Crossing, Platte River and Cheyenne Fork.

In June and July 1863, a new cavalry battalion was formed at Camp Dennison in Ohio, and on July 1863, the Battalion was consolidated to form the 11th Ohio Cavalry Regiment.

The battalion was mustered out of service on July, 1863.

== Commanders ==
- Lt. Col. William O. Collins

== See also ==
- List of Ohio Civil War units
- Ohio in the Civil War
