= William O. Collins =

American politician

William Collins
- Born: William Oliver Collins; August 23, 1809; Somers, Connecticut, U.S.
- Died: October 26, 1880 (aged 71); Hillsborough, Ohio, U.S.
- Alma mater: Amherst College
- Military career
- Allegiance: United States; Union
- Branch: United States Army; Union Army
- Service years: 1861–1865
- Rank: Colonel, U.S.V
- Commands: 7th Ohio Cavalry; 11th Ohio Cavalry; Fort Laramie
- Conflicts: Colorado War: Battle of Mud Springs; Battle of Rush Creek
- Other work: Ohio State Legislator

William Oliver Collins (August 23, 1809 – October 26, 1880) was an American attorney, politician, and Union Army officer who served in the cavalry during the Civil War and in the American West. He is the namesake for Fort Collins, Colorado, and Casper, Wyoming's name is derived from his son, Caspar W. Collins, who died nearby shortly after William's command of a garrison there.

== Early life and education ==
Collins was born in Somers, Connecticut and graduated from Amherst College in Amherst, Massachusetts.

== Career ==
=== Political ===
Collins moved to Ohio where he worked as a lawyer and served in the Ohio Senate from 1860 to 1862.

=== Military ===
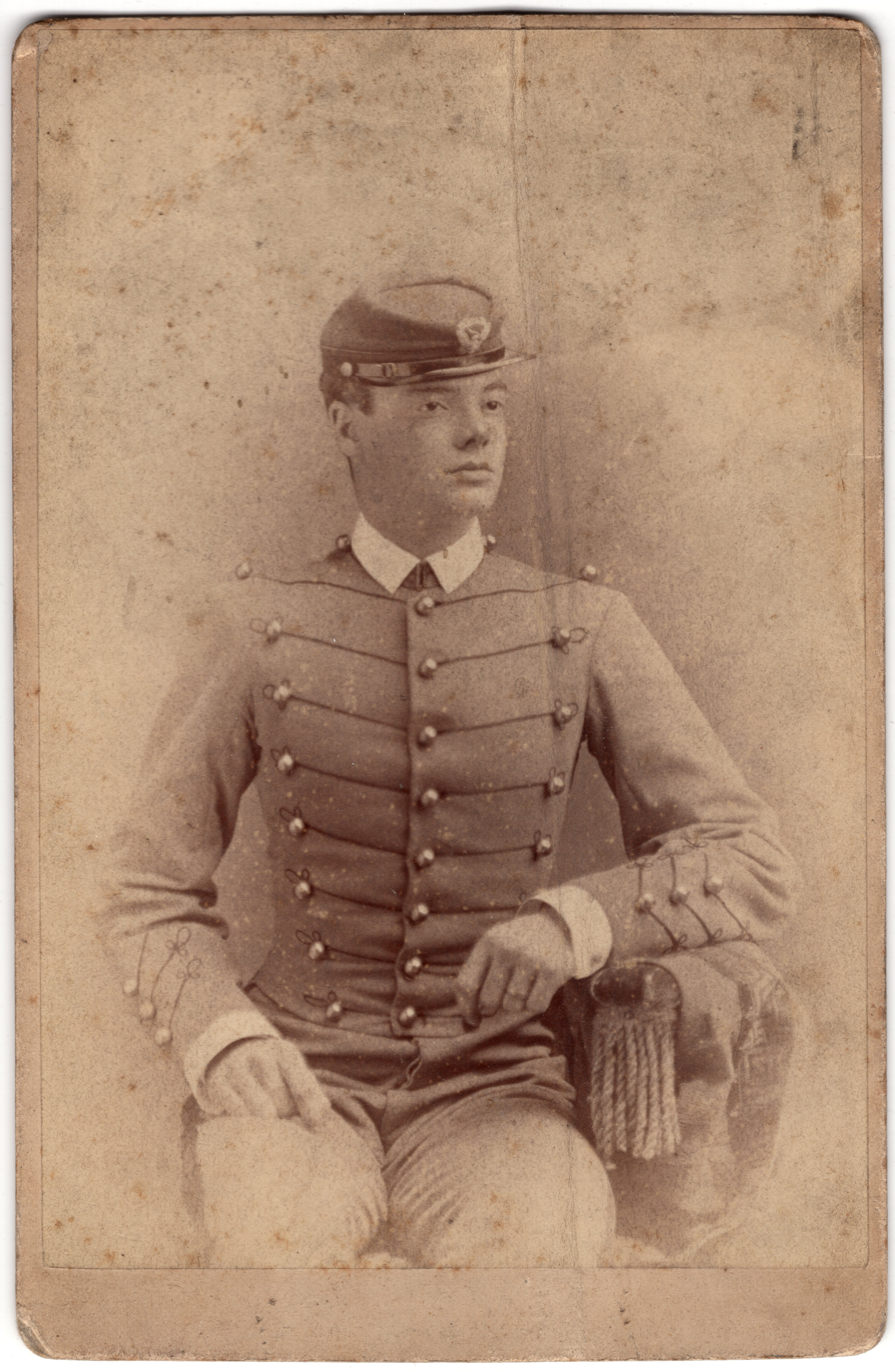

During the American Civil War, Collins was appointed colonel of the 7th Ohio Cavalry. However, this regiment never completed its muster and was therefore consolidated with the 6th Ohio Cavalry. Collins was now named lieutenant colonel of the 6th Ohio Cavalry with William Lloyd as colonel. Collins was resentful his regiment had been absorbed into another and used his political influence to have his original four companies transferred to an independent command. Ordered to St. Louis MO in February 1862, Collins' command was officially declared the 1st Ohio Independent Cavalry Battalion. Collins served under General James Craig protecting the Overland Mail routes in Nebraska Territory. In June 1862, four additional companies were recruited at Camp Dennison to be added to the 1st Ohio Cavalry Battilion. Before Collins could unite the two battalions, the new recruits were mobilized for the defense against Morgan's Ohio Raid. Also during this time General Craig ordered troops to establish a military post in northern Colorado Territory. Craig named the post Camp Collins in honor of the Ohio cavalry officer. The two Ohio cavalry battalions were joined to create the 11th Ohio Cavalry and on September 20, 1862, Collins was appointed lieutenant colonel, the de facto commanding officer. Lieutenant Colonel Collins commanded Fort Laramie from 1863 to 1864. In August, he authorized the establishment of "Fort" Collins the previous establishment having been destroyed by a flood. Collins commanded the Western Sub-district of the District of Nebraska from 1864 to 1865.

On November 29, 1864, the U.S. Army committed the Sand Creek Massacre, leading to a series of retaliatory battles in early 1865 by an alliance of Native Americans. During this time he was ranking officer at a military garrison called Platte Bridge Station, near present-day Casper, Wyoming, from which he led troops into action against the Native American warriors in the battles of Mud Springs and Rush Creek.

In April 1865, Collins and the original four companies of the 11th Ohio Cavalry were mustered out of the volunteer service.

In July 1865, his son, Lt. Caspar Collins was killed by nearby insurgents, and the garrison his father William had commanded was renamed Fort Caspar in the son's honor—which would live on as the area grew as Casper, Wyoming.

== Personal life ==
After being discharged from the Army in 1865, Collins settled in Hillsboro, Ohio. He died on October 26, 1880.
