= Caspar W. Collins =

American Soldier

Caspar Weaver Collins
- Born: September 30, 1844; Hillsboro, Ohio
- Died: July 26, 1865 (aged 20); Near present-day Casper, Wyoming
- Cause of death: Killed in Action
- Burial place: Hillsboro, Ohio
- Relatives: Son of William O. Collins
- Military career
- Branch: Army
- Rank: First Lieutenant
- Unit: 11th Ohio Volunteer Cavalry
- Conflicts: Battle of Platte Bridge/American Indian Wars

Caspar Weaver Collins (September 30, 1844 – July 26, 1865) was an American Union Army officer who served in the 11th Ohio Volunteer Cavalry in the American west. He is the namesake for Fort Caspar (historically known as Fort Casper), from which Casper, Wyoming derives its name. He was the son of William O. Collins, a Colonel who had command of the 11th Ohio Volunteer Cavalry. Caspar Collins was killed in the Battle of Platte Bridge on July 26, 1865.

== Early life ==
Caspar Collins was born in the family home in Hillsboro, Ohio on September 30, 1844 to William and Catherine Collins. He had two sisters, Josephine and Mary.

== Military career ==
On June 30, 1863, Caspar was commissioned as second lieutenant for Company G of the 11th Ohio Volunteer Cavalry, one of four companies recruited by William Collins. Company G would be assigned to outposts from Fort Laramie to South Pass Station. On May 1, 1865, he was promoted to first lieutenant.

== Artwork ==
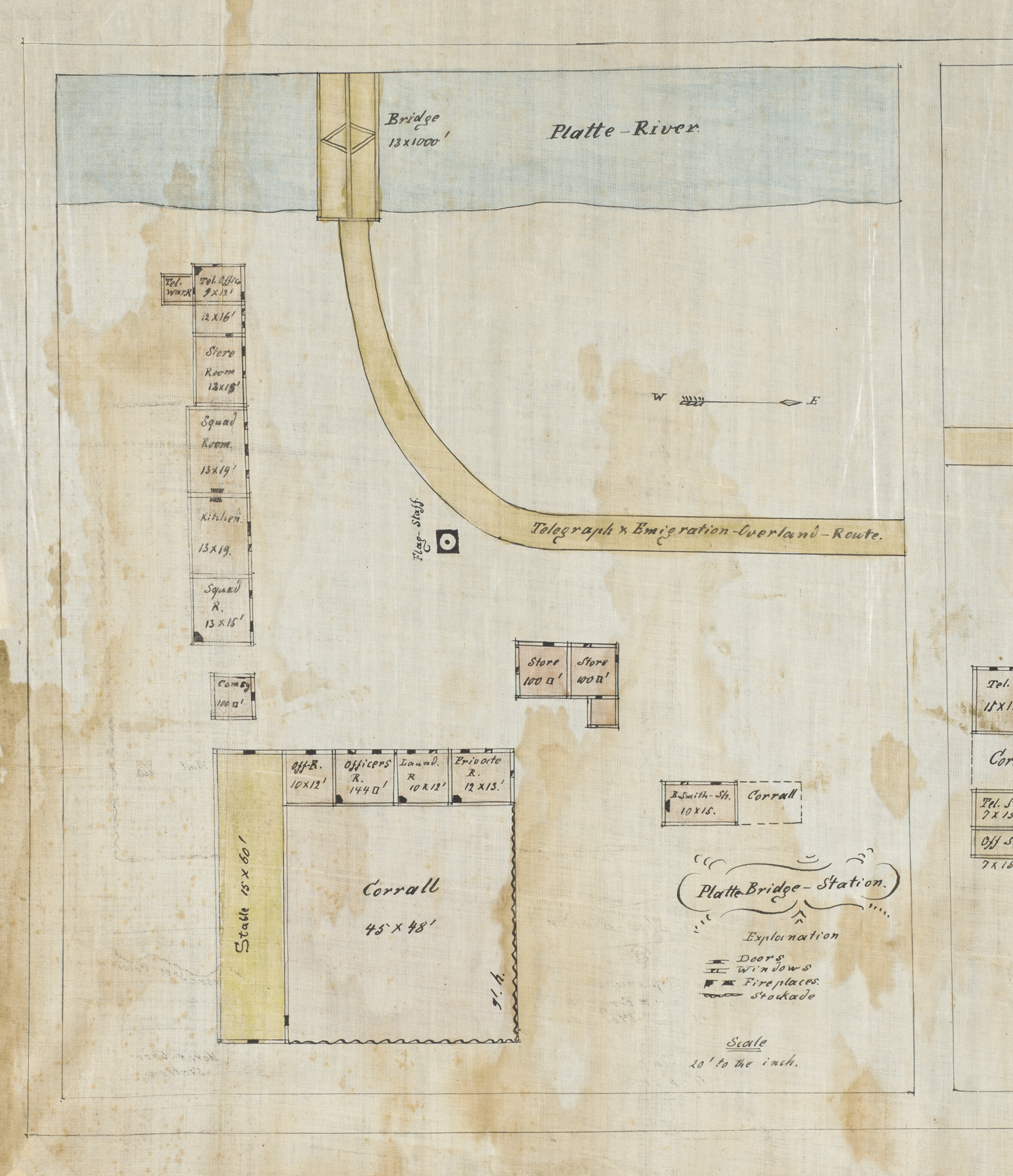
General layout of Platte Bridge Station drawn by Caspar Collins (circa 1864).

Caspar Collins' mother Catherine taught him how to draw and sketch. Throughout his travels in the West he would send letters to friends and family with depictions of the sights and people he met. He also completed images and floorplans of several of the frontier forts. His sketches were used to reconstruct the military post which would become the Fort Caspar Museum.

== Battle of Platte Bridge ==
On July 26, 1865, Lieutenant Collins took command of a small detachment from Platte Bridge Station in an attempt to reach Army supply wagons returning from Sweetwater Station near Independence Rock. Once across the bridge the unit was ambushed by members of the Lakota, Cheyenne and Arapaho tribes. Collins and four of the soldiers with him were killed in the battle. His body was later found and taken back to Hillsboro, Ohio for burial.

== Renaming the fort and name misspelling ==
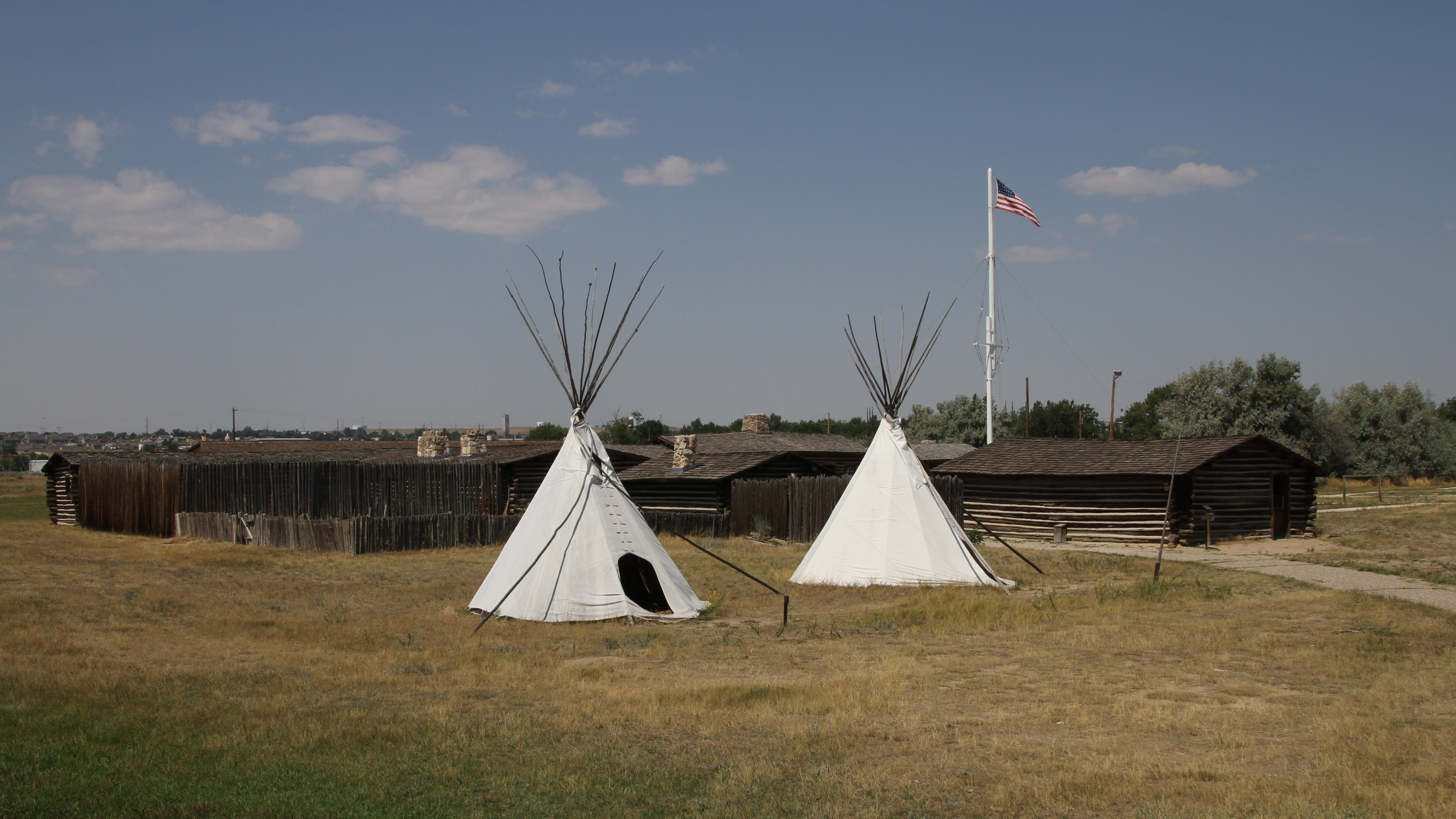
Fort Caspar Museum, 2017.

On November 21, 1865, Platte Bridge Station was renamed to Fort Casper by Special Order 49 by Major General John Pope. As there was already a Camp Collins in Colorado, it was decided to use the lieutenant's first name. When the order was written the name was misspelled as "Casper." When the museum was opened in 1936 it was decided to correct the spelling in the museum name, but the "er" spelling remains on local landmarks and the City of Casper.

== Misidentified photograph ==
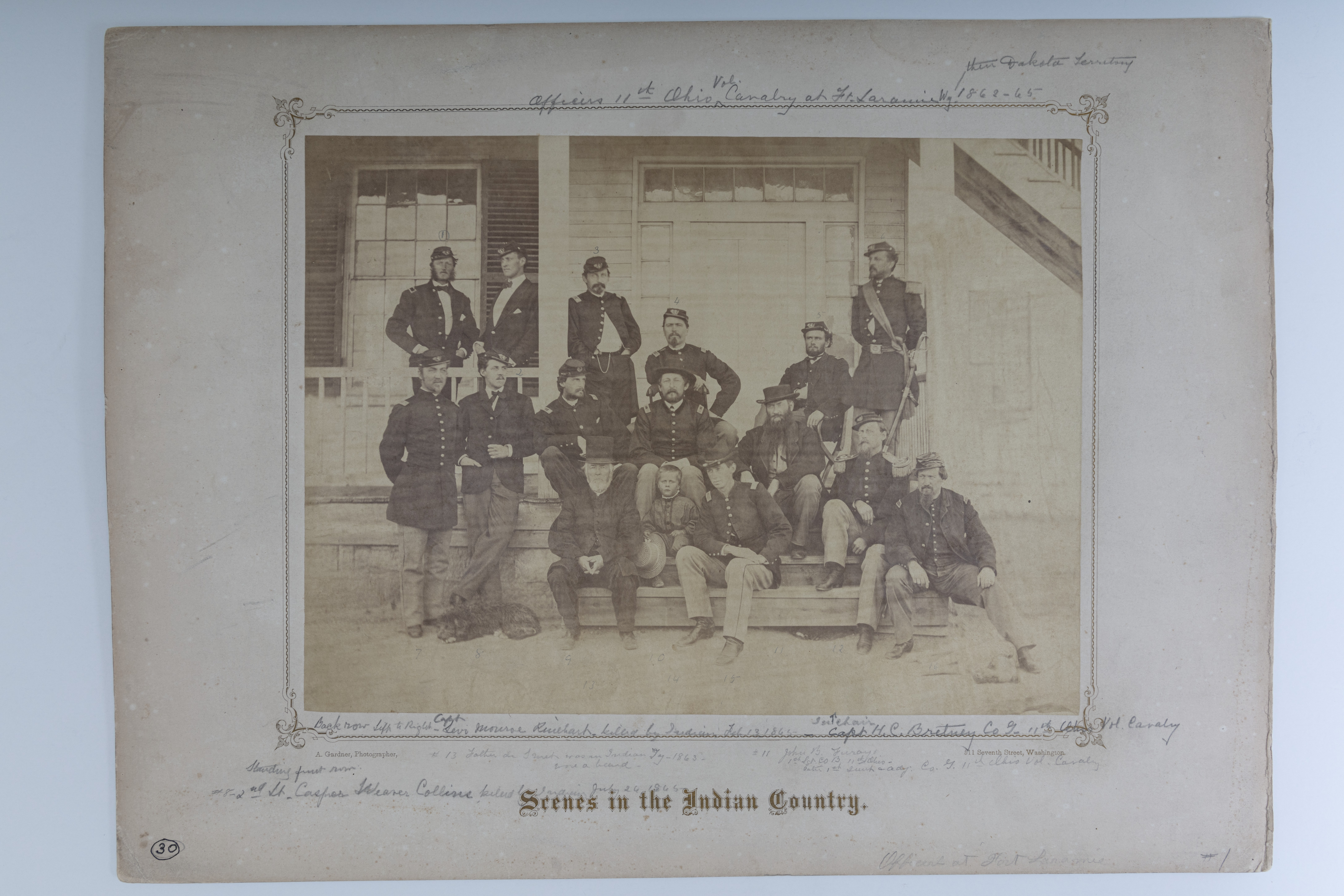
Alexander Gardner photograph with the incorrect identification of Caspar Collins, taken at Fort Laramie, 1867.

A photograph taken by Alexander Gardner at Fort Laramie in 1867 or 1868 incorrectly identifies an Infantry officer as Caspar Collins. This image was used as the basis for his likeness in a painting by Ruth Joy Hopkins in 1956, now on display at Fort Caspar Museum, and bronze sculpture by Pershing Geiger in 1981, now on display at the Ford Wyoming Center. The only known photograph of Caspar Collins is one of him as a child. This photograph was put through age progression techniques to create an image of what he might have looked like at the time of his death.

== See also ==
- Fort Caspar, originally Platte Bridge Station, renamed for Caspar Collins.
- William O. Collins, father of Caspar Collins
- Battle of Platte Bridge, battle where Caspar Collins was killed.
- American Indian Wars
