= Poudre Lake =

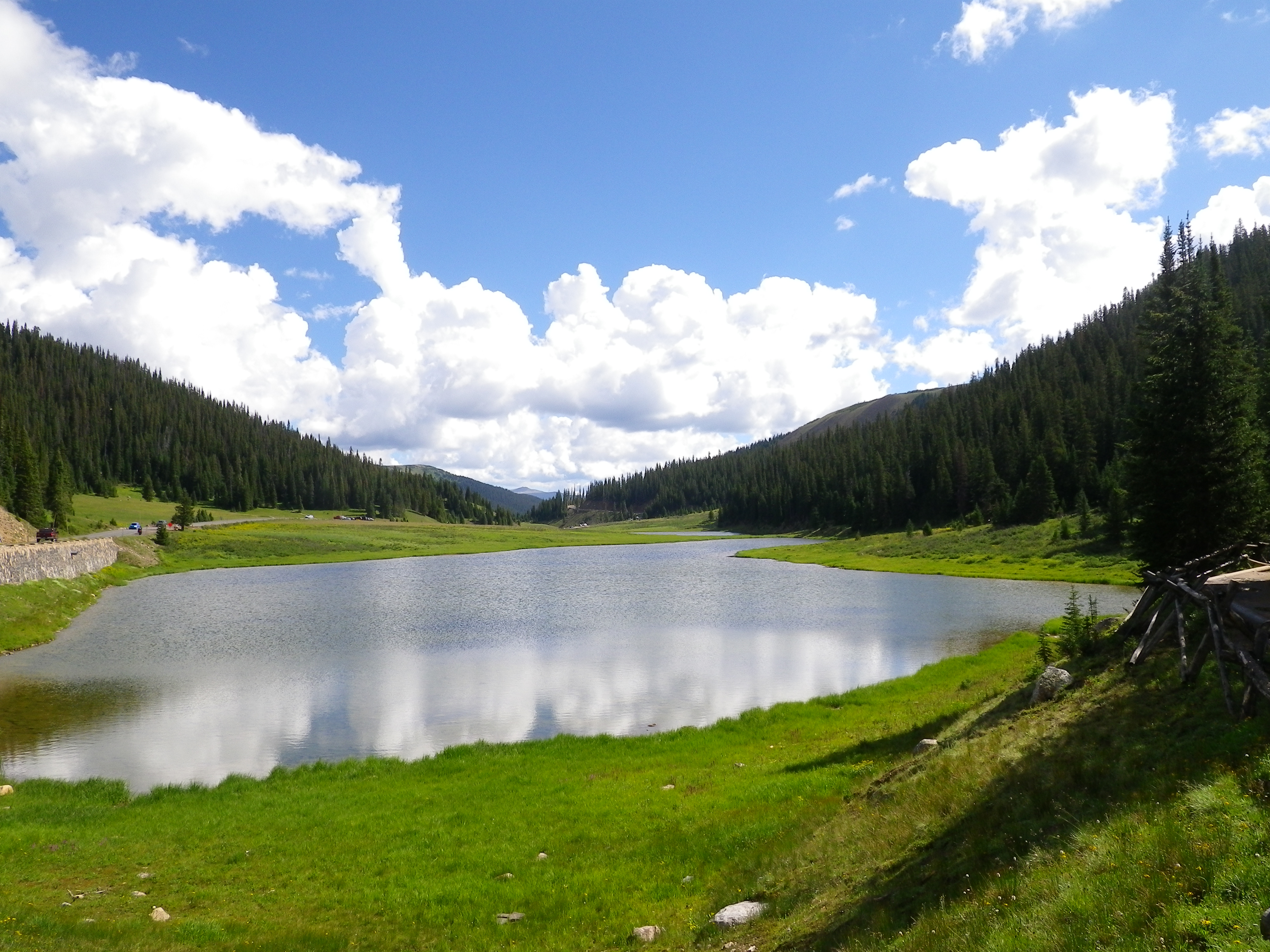
- Poudre Lake

- Location within Colorado
- Location: Larimer County, Colorado
- Coordinates: 40°25′19″N 105°48′31″W
- Type: alpine lake
- Surface elevation: 3,278 m (10,755 ft)

Poudre Lake is an alpine lake and a main source of Poudre River. It is located just a few feet east of the Continental Divide in Larimer County, Colorado, United States.

U.S. Route 34 passes the lake and crosses the Continental Divide at Milner Pass at the southwest end of the lake.

It is a "dead lake", as fish cannot survive in it because it freezes completely during the winter months.
