= Joseph Mason (settler) =

Homesteader in Larimer County, Colorado in the 1860s

- Born: Joseph Messier; January 28, 1840; Montreal, Canada
- Died: February 11, 1881 (aged 41); Fort Collins, Colorado, US
- Occupations: Explorer, businessman, sheriff, Postmaster
- Known for: Father of Fort Collins, Colorado
- Spouse: Luella M. Blake
- Children: Minnie Luella Mason, Albert J. Mason, Lizzie C. Mason

Joseph Mason (January 28, 1840 – February 1881) was an explorer, business man, law man, and early settler of the Colorado Territory. He is best known as the "Father of Fort Collins, Colorado".

Mason was an early white homesteader in Larimer County, Colorado in the 1860s. Mason settled a large tract of land along the Cache la Poudre River in present-day north Fort Collins, and he played in an instrumental role in persuading the United States Army to found Camp Collins along the river adjacent to his property in 1864. After Colorado became a territory in 1861, Mason was appointed to the first board of county commissioners. He became prominent in politics and business in Fort Collins after the founding of the town in 1867, and served in several official posts, including becoming Sheriff of Larimer County in 1871.

== Early life and settling in the West ==
Joseph Mason was born Joseph Messier on a farm near Montreal, Canada, January 28, 1840. He was the youngest child in a family of 10 He attended school in both Montreal and Sherbrooke before immigrating to the United States at the age of 15. After moving to the New England region of the United States, he Americanized his name to Mason.

After spending a year in Mississippi, in early 1859, Mason travelled to St. Louis, Missouri and joined the Raynolds Expedition which was traveling west to explore the headwaters of the Yellowstone River, but Mason left the expedition, before it was complete, in the winter of 1859-1860 while they were wintering over in Deer Creek Station in central Wyoming. From there, Mason traveled south to Laporte, Colorado, arriving on February 10, 1860, where he found a settlement of mountaineers, trappers, and Native Americans. Mason briefly left Laporte to spend time in the mining camps, but returned to the area to settle 4 miles downstream from the town in 1862.

Upon returning to the Cache la Poudre valley, Mason purchased a 160 acre tract of land from a Native American woman who was the recent widow of a man named Gangros. The land was located on the south side of the river a little over a mile northwest of present-day Fort Collins. In 1862, the governor of the Colorado Territory, John Evans, appointed Mason to the first board of county commissioners.

== Contributions to Fort Collins ==
In June 1864, a flood destroyed the nearby Army camp called Camp Collins. When Lt. James Hannah and his men were looking for safer ground on which to relocate the camp, they encountered Mason, who suggested they relocate on land near his property. He suggested that this ground would be high enough to be safe from flooding and would allow a good vantage point for spotting impending attacks from hostile Native American groups in the area.

Once the camp was moved to its new location, Mason and Major Asaph Allen built the first store, called Old Grout, in 1865. It was a two-story concrete sutler's store built on the south edge of the camp, and Mason was appointed as the sutler, or store keeper for the camp. Mason and his partner, Mr. Sherwood, also supplied horses to the army camp. When the post office was located in the sutler's store, Mason was also appointed as the first postmaster to the camp. In 1877, President Hayes reappointed Mason as postmaster but Mason resigned the office in 1879.

In 1868, Mason was instrumental in getting the county seat of Larimer County to Fort Collins from Laporte. Once the county seat was moved to Fort Collins, the courthouse was located on the second floor of the Old Grout sutler's store building.

In 1871, Mason was elected Sheriff of Larimer County. He was reelected to the position in 1873. During his time as sheriff, Mason arrested noted criminal Happy Jack, but he subsequently escaped custody. He also arrested notorious outlaw known as "Dirty Desmond."

In 1872, Mason purchased the Lindell flour mill from Elizabeth Auntie Stone and Henry C. Peterson.

Joseph Mason donated 50 acres of land to help build Colorado State University.

Mason Street in Fort Collins is named for Joseph Mason.

== Personal life ==
In 1861 in Denver, Mason took part in a duel with a Frenchman over a Native American woman. The Frenchman fainted before either party could draw their weapon, so no shots were fired. It is not known what became of the woman, but she did not end up with Mason. The woman's name was Mary Polzell

Mason married Luella M. Blake, the daughter of George G. Blake on July 3, 1870. The couple had two children who survived to adulthood, Minnie Luella Mason and Albert J. Mason, and one child, Lizzie C. Mason, that died in early infancy.

== Death ==
On February 9, 1881, Mason was kicked in the head by one of his horses. Local doctors removed 62 pieces of skull fragment from the wound, but could not save him. On February 11, 1881, Mason died of his wounds. He is buried in Grand View Cemetery in Fort Collins.<ref name="auto2"/
