= Cache la Poudre River =

River in Colorado, United States

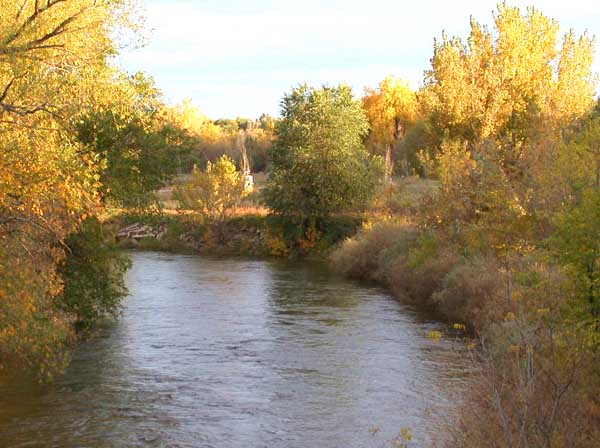
- Cache La Poudre River as it flows through Fort Collins, Colorado.

Location
- Country: United States
- Cities: Fort Collins, Greeley

Physical characteristics
- Source: Rocky Mountains
  - location: Rocky Mountain National Park
  - coordinates: 40°25′29″N 105°48′24″W
  - elevation: 10,755 ft (3,278 m)
- Mouth: South Platte River
  - location: Near Greeley
  - coordinates: 40°25′17″N 104°36′3″W
  - elevation: 4,600 ft (1,400 m)
- Length: 126 mi (203 km)
- Discharge
  - location: Fort Collins
  - average: 162 cu ft/s (4.6 m^{3}/s)
  - minimum: 0 cu ft/s (0 m^{3}/s)
  - maximum: 6,080 cu ft/s (172 m^{3}/s)

Basin features
- Tributaries
  - left: North Fork Cache la Poudre River
  - right: South Fork Cache la Poudre River

National Wild and Scenic River
- Type: Wild, Recreational
- Designated: October 30, 1986

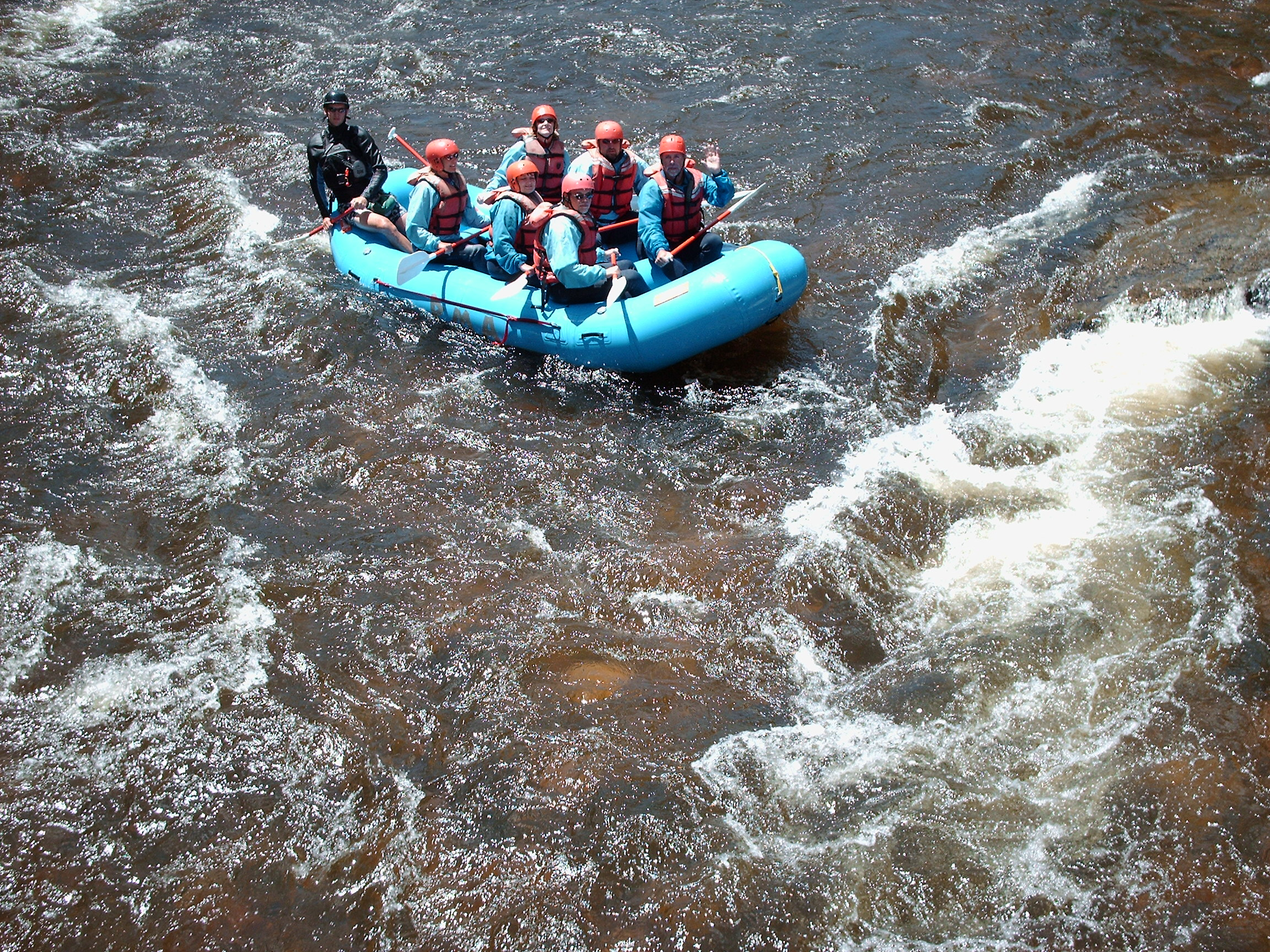
Rafters on the Poudre River near the Grey Rock trailhead

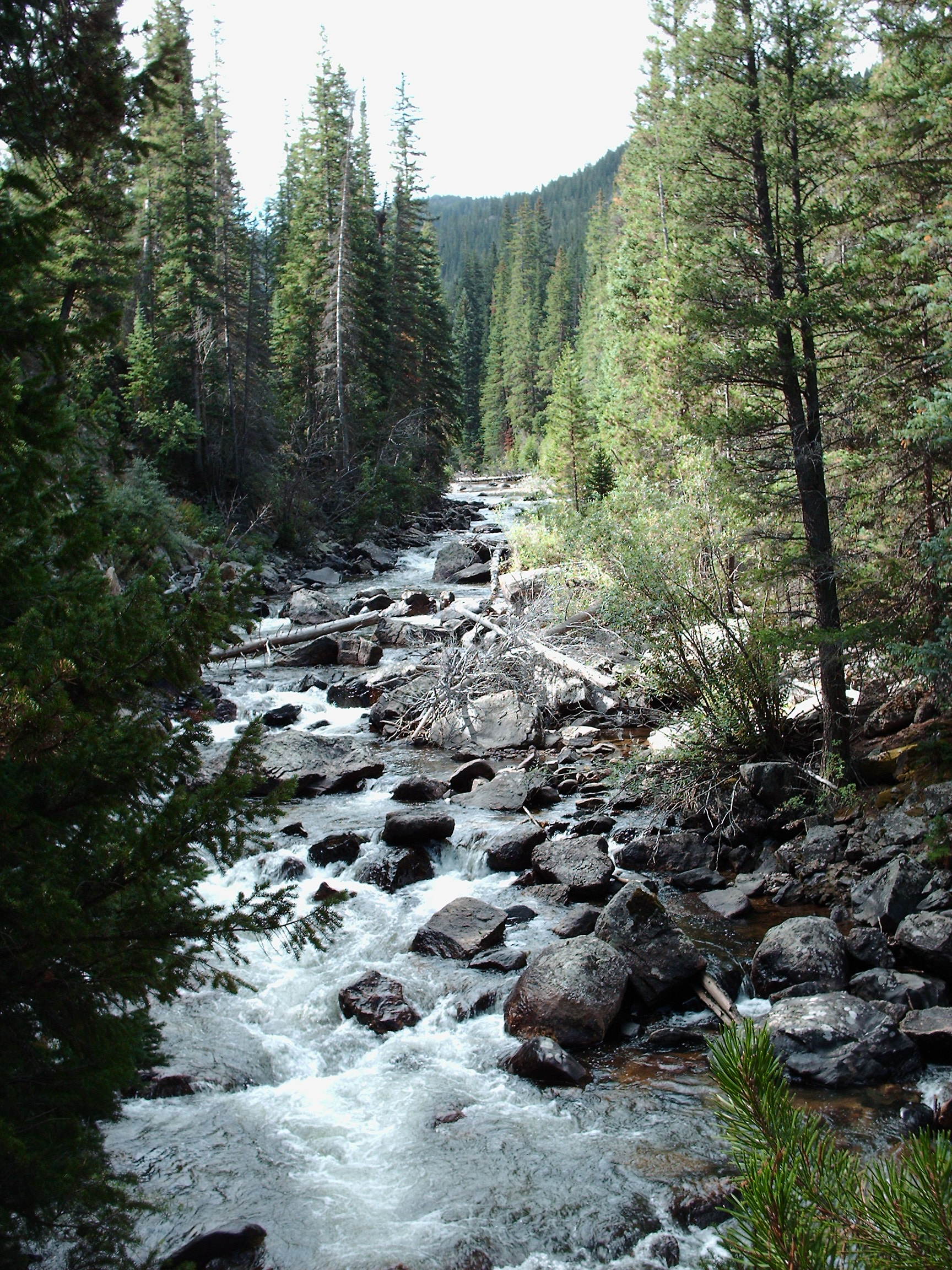
View of the Poudre River from the Big South trail

The Cache la Poudre River (/ˌkæʃ lə ˈpuːdər/ KASH lə POO-dər), also known as the Poudre River, is a river in the state of Colorado in the United States.

== Name ==
The name, Cache la Poudre (French for 'Hide the Powder'), is a corruption of the original Cache à la Poudre, or "cache of powder". It refers to an incident in the 1820s when French trappers, caught by a snowstorm, were forced to bury part of their gunpowder along the banks of the river.

== Geography ==
Its headwaters are in the Front Range in Larimer County, in the northern part of Rocky Mountain National Park. The main source is Poudre Lake. The river descends eastward in the mountains through the Roosevelt National Forest in Poudre Canyon. It emerges from the foothills north of the city of Fort Collins.

It flows eastward across the plains, passing north of the city of Greeley, and flows into the South Platte River approximately 5 miles (8.0 km) east of Greeley.

== History ==
The river is a popular summer destination for fly fishing, whitewater rafting, tubing, and kayaking in the Poudre Canyon, due in large part to the enormous 6,155 feet (1,876 m) elevation variance between its headwaters and its mouth, resulting in a typically very swift current. The river has been substantially populated since the 1930s by year-round residences. While a popular summer destination, the area has residential communities and churches that provide a year-round presence in the rural area. The fish in the Cache La Poudre River include: rainbow, brown and brook trout.

The river is subject to sudden and devastating floods which often impact nearby communities. A flood in 1864 destroyed the military post, Camp Collins, located near the river at La Porte. The military relocated the camp and renamed it Fort Collins. Although no fort was ever built, the current city of Fort Collins was established and continues to experience periodic flooding from the Cache La Poudre.

== Description ==
The Cache La Poudre River Corridor National Heritage Area includes the 100-year flood plain of the river from its emergence from the mountains to its confluence with the South Platte River.

On October 30, 1986, 76 miles (122 km) of the Cache la Poudre River were designated as a Wild and Scenic River under the National Wild and Scenic Rivers System. The designation spans from the headwaters of the river at Cache la Poudre Lake in Rocky Mountain National Park, downstream along the south fork of the river. 30 miles are classified as wild, and 46 miles are classified as recreational.

=== Trout fishing ===
From its headwaters downstream, through the city of Fort Collins, the Cache la Poudre River contains abundant populations of self-sustaining wild trout. The majority of trout that live within the river system are brown trout.

Special regulations apply for certain stretches of the Poudre by the Colorado Division of Wildlife. These regulations include the use of flies and lures only and strict catch and release designations. Special regulation waters include The Indian Meadows Section, The Hatchery Section and a small tailwater stretch of the North Fork of the Cache la Poudre River, which flows from Seamen Reservoir to the main fork of the Poudre. As the Cache la Poudre leaves the canyon for the valley to flow through Fort Collins the water quality decreases significantly. Although trout still live in the lower Cache la Poudre, the population is increasingly diminished due to marginal water flows and water quality, both of which greatly hinder self-sustained trout reproduction in the lower Poudre.

== Northern Integrated Supply Project ==
A project proposed by the Northern Colorado Water Conservation District called the Northern Integrated Supply Project includes several water supply projects, but focuses on the Glade Reservoir, which would be located north of Fort Collins, Colorado, and the Galeton Reservoir, which would be located north of Eaton, Colorado, and would supply 40,000 acre-feet (49,000,000 m^{3}) of water annually to 15 communities in Northern Colorado. Both reservoirs would be filled by a diversion from the Cache la Poudre River and would store that water for use by these communities. The project has been studied by the United States Army Corps of Engineers since 2005, resulting in a draft Environmental Impact Statement (DEIS) released in September 2008. Due to the number and complexity of significant comments received during the public comment period, the COE determined that additional analysis would be required before a decision on whether to approve or deny the permit can be made. They plan to release a supplemental DEIS in late 2013.

To supply 40,000 acre-feet (49,000,000 m^{3}) of water from the reservoirs, significant quantities of water would be diverted from the Poudre River above the city of Fort Collins, Colorado. Most diversions would occur during the peak snowmelt runoff in May and June. Essentially all the water that is diverted (and pumped) into the off-stream Glade Reservoir would be released back to the river at a later time. But these releases into the Poudre from Glade would be entirely offset by water that would normally be released from Horsetooth Reservoir into the Poudre, also upstream of Fort Collins. This Horsetooth water, originating from Colorado's west slope, would be piped to most of the NISP subscriber communities outside the Poudre basin instead of going to agricultural users downstream on the Poudre River and South Platte River. According to the first DEIS, the net diversion from the Poudre would represent anywhere from 26 to 71% of the flow as measured in downtown Fort Collins. These flow reductions are in addition to existing diversions that have removed approximately 50-60% of the river's water since European settlement began in the valley.

The formation of the Glade Reservoir has been the highlight of backlash from local communities. A group called "Save the Poudre" was created from the formation of the project in 2005, and has fought the project since, citing negative environmental and economic impacts that will come in the fulfillment of this project. On the other hand, supporters of NISP and the Glade Reservoir cite a negative alternatives like buy and dry (which is when a farmer sells their water rights, and to ensure that the farmer doesn't divert any more water, the land is completely dried up), as a reason to support NISP. The potential necessity for this reservoir comes from the increasing population of the Northern Colorado region, causing an increase in the demand for water while the supply of water has been slightly decreasing due to decreased snow packing in the mountains, which is a major way of storing water for the Northern Colorado area. The City of Fort Collins, which diverts water from the Poudre River and has more senior water rights than NISP, has addressed concerns with the Glade Reservoir in terms of its negative environmental impacts, which NISP has been trying to mitigate through various projects.

As of June 2018, NISP is working on releasing an environmental impact report, which is analyzed by the Army Corps of Engineers, and people can submit their comments on this report to the Army Corps of Engineers. The Army Corps of Engineers' final call on their approval of NISP is slated to happen sometime in 2019. With Save the Poudre stating they will take the Army Corps of Engineers to court if they approve the project, this process could possibly be dragged out to the point that NISP doesn't get any water rights until 2025 instead of the predicted year of 2020.

== See also ==
- List of Colorado rivers
- List of National Wild and Scenic Rivers
