= Blue Creek Canyon =

Canyon in Gunnison County, Colorado, USA

- Little Blue Creek Canyon
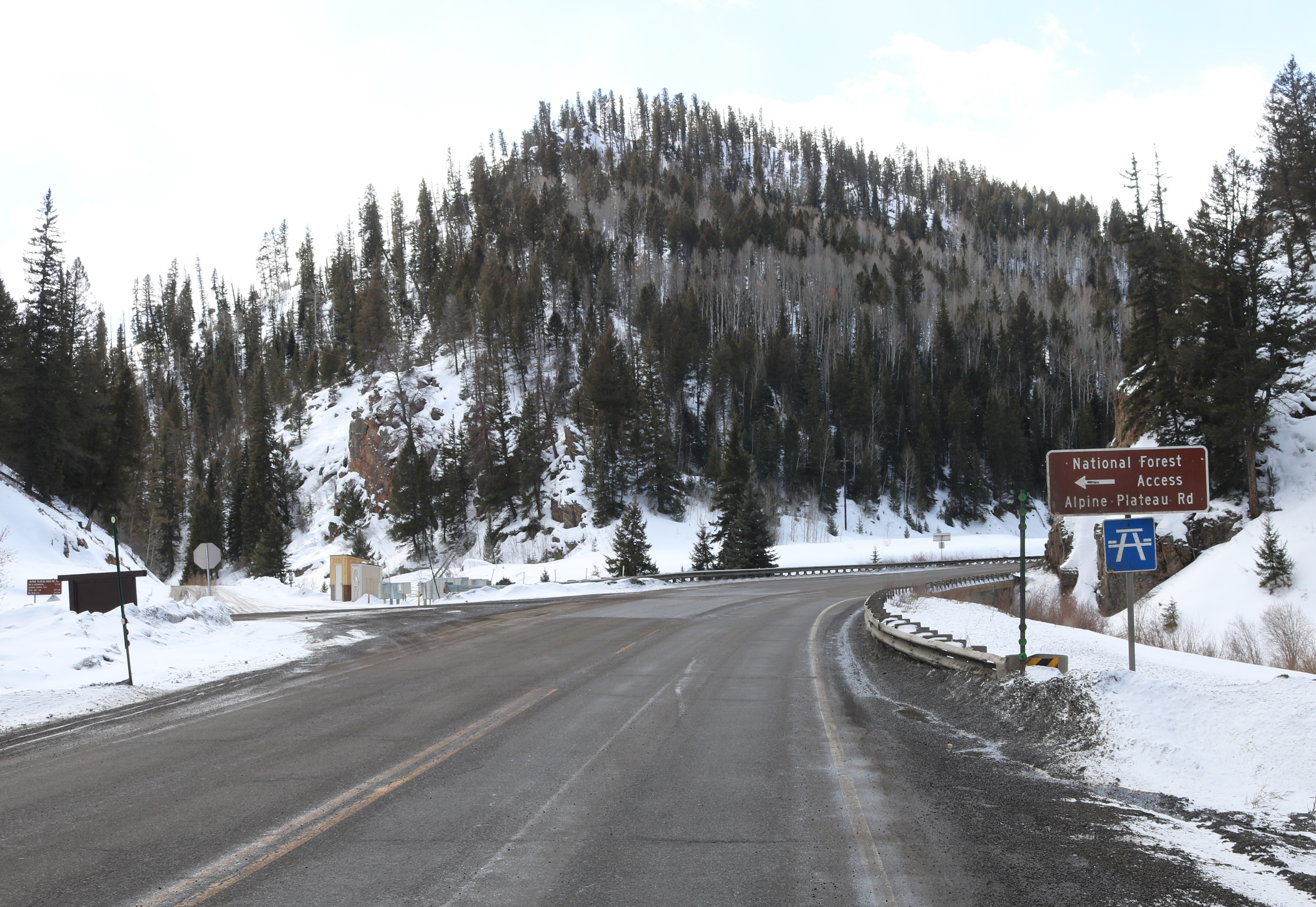

- Location within Colorado
- Floor elevation: 2,492 m (8,176 ft)
- Length: 3.8 mi (6.1 km) N-S

Geography
- Location: Gunnison County, Colorado
- Country: United States
- State: Colorado
- Borders on: Fitzpatrick Mesa; Blue Mesa
- Coordinates: 38°24′16″N 107°24′28″W
- Topo map: Curecanti Needle
- Traversed by: US 50
- Rivers: Blue Creek; Little Blue Creek; Big Blue Creek
- Interactive map of Blue Creek Canyon

Blue Creek Canyon is a narrow, steep-walled canyon in Gunnison County, Colorado. It lies between Fitzpatrick Mesa and Blue Mesa and is south of Morrow Point Reservoir and southeast of Cimarron, Colorado. U.S. Highway 50 goes through the canyon. Gunnison County Road 867 (also called Alpine Plateau Road and Forest Service Road 867) intersects with Highway 50 near the middle of the canyon.

== Upcoming highway construction ==
The highway through the canyon is narrow and winding. Because of this, many accidents have occurred there. The U.S. Department of Transportation and various other agencies are making safety improvements to the 3.8 mile section of the highway in Blue Creek Canyon (which U.S. DOT websites refer to as Little Blue Creek Canyon). The work began in April 2021 and will last through fall 2023. The construction — which involves widening the highway, widening and paving the shoulders, replacing guardrail, and adding new signage and striping — is requiring frequent and long-duration closures of the highway.

== Blue Creek ==
Inside the canyon, Little Blue Creek and Big Blue Creek merge to form Blue Creek. The confluence is adjacent to the intersection of Highway 50 and Alpine Plateau Road, next to the bridge. Immediately after the confluence, Blue Creek flows under the bridge, flows north along the highway's west side, and then separates from the highway heading northwest and eventually empties into Morrow Point Reservoir at the Curecanti Needle.

== Geology ==
The canyon walls are made of metamorphic rocks and are filled with big and small pegmatite dikes. Some of the dikes contain large, intergrown crystals of feldspar and pink quartz.
