= Curecanti Needle =

Granite spire in Colorado, USA

Curecanti Needle,
- Curecanti National Recreation Area (National Park Service)
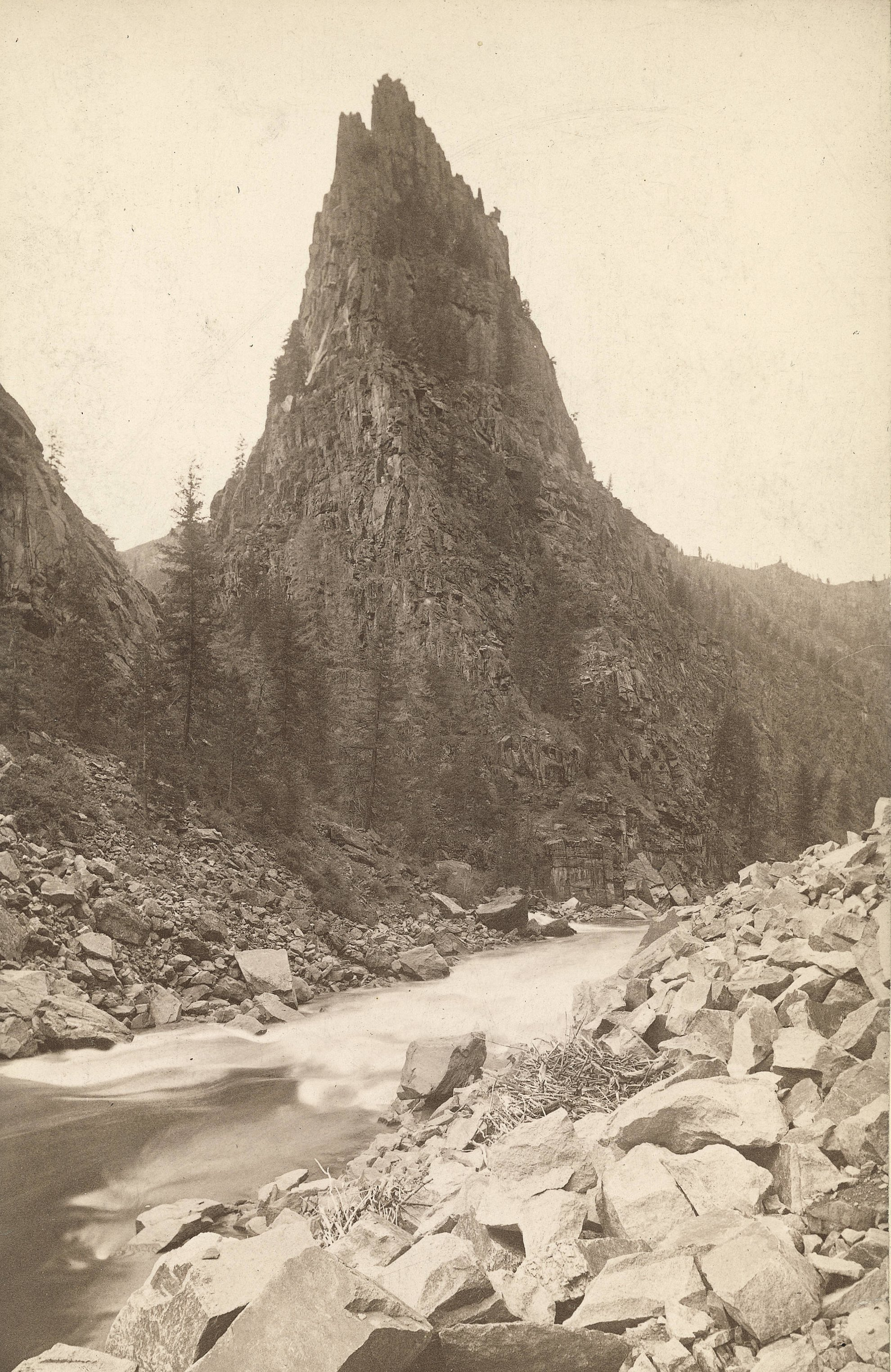
- The Curecanti Needle photographed ca. 1884.

Highest point
- Elevation: 7,739 ft (2,359 m)
- Prominence: 700 ft (210 m)
- Coordinates: 38°26′56″N 107°24′51″W

Geography
- Location: Morrow Point Reservoir, Gunnison River, Gunnison County, Colorado, US
- Topo map(s): Curecanti Needle; MRC: 38107D4; U.S. Geological Survey (USGS); Topo Series:7.5´ Map Scale:1:24,000

The Curecanti Needle is a 700-ft granite spire located on the Gunnison River in western Colorado. A notable landmark to generations of natives and pioneers, the Needle is located on the southern bank of Morrow Point Reservoir, an impoundment of the Gunnison river between Gunnison and Montrose, Colorado. Used for many years as an advertising symbol for the Denver and Rio Grande Western Railroad, whose narrow-gauge railway famously ran along the northern bank of the river and passed near the Needle, the spire is today part of the Curecanti National Recreation Area, a National Park Service facility that encompasses three impoundments of the Gunnison river, including Morrow Point Reservoir.

== Location ==
The Needle is located in the upper reaches of the Black Canyon of the Gunnison, along a portion of the Gunnison river impounded in 1965. On the south bank of the reservoir, the spire is immediately west of the mouth of Blue Creek and directly across the river from the mouth of Curecanti Creek, approximately 3.4 miles west of Blue Mesa Dam. The area south of the Needle is traversed by the section of U.S. Highway 50 between Gunnison and Montrose.

== History ==
Though the upper Gunnison River area was known to generations of trappers, traders, and explorers, it was the development of the Denver & Rio Grande railroad in the 1880s that first brought the Needle to larger public attention. Famously balked by the Atchison, Topeka, and Santa Fe Railroad in their attempt to build a main line into New Mexico through the Raton Pass, the Denver & Rio Grande instead began to expand into central Colorado, building a line west along the Arkansas River, through the Royal Gorge and into the San Juan Valley. Eager to extend this line to a junction with the Denver and Rio Grande Western, then building east from Utah, the D&RG continued west from Salida, across Marshall Pass, and into Gunnison, which it reached in August 1881.

West of the city the line began to follow the north bank of the Gunnison River, where it entered the upper reaches of the Black Canyon. Running along the bottom of the canyon, the line passed directly across the narrow river from the Curecanti Needle, between the towns of Sapinero and Cimmarron. The granite formation quickly become a popular landmark along the route, grabbing the attention of passengers who stopped and marveled at the striking and unique spire. Skilled at marketing the beautiful and impressive areas through which their lines ran, such as the Royal Gorge and Moffat Tunnel, the D&RGW eventually adopted the Needle as a symbol of their Royal Gorge route, confidently referred to as "The Scenic Line of the World." Emblazoned on timetables and promotional materials for the route, the easily recognizable Needle would also serve as the main logo for the entire rail line in the first two decades of the 20th century.

The Needle remained a popular landmark with railroad passengers until the 1950s, when the D&RGW ended service through the Black Canyon after nearly a century. Three years later the rail lines near the Needle were covered by the waters of Morrow Point Reservoir, an element of the Wayne N. Aspinall Storage Unit of the Colorado River Storage Project (CRSP) created by the construction of the Morrow Point Dam on the Gunnison River several miles west of the spire. After decades of prominence, the flooding of the canyon for the reservoir and the abandonment of the rail line quickly returned the area around the Needle to an earlier state, remote and difficult to access. Since the impoundment of the Gunnison, the Needle has become a part of the Curecanti National Recreation Area, a National Park Service-administered area responsible for the development and management of recreation facilities on Morrow Point and the other two reservoirs that compose the Wayne N. Aspinall Storage Unit.

== Access ==
=== By road and trail ===
Though U.S. 50 runs close by south of the Needle there is no direct road access. There is also no direct trail access. The closest developed trail is the Curecanti Creek Trail, which follows the moderately steep descent of Curecanti creek south to its entry into Morrow Point Reservoir. Though it is on the opposite (North) side of the river, the trail, and its attendant river-side campsite, are directly across the river from the Needle, offering excellent views to experienced hikers.

Curecanti Creek Trail (4 miles round-trip) 900 ft. elevation change. Access by trail-head located at the Pioneer Point overlook on Colorado Highway 92, 5.7 miles from the junction with U.S. Hwy 50.

=== By boat ===
There is direct access to the Needle by boat, but these must be hand carried down the 232-steps of the Pine Creek Trail, accessible from U.S. Hwy 50, west of Blue Mesa Dam. Boaters on Morrow Point Reservoir are required to obtain a free back-country use permit, available at the Pine Creek Trail-head. Once on the water, boaters can directly access the base of the Needle along Blue Creek. An undeveloped boat-in campsite is available for boaters at Blue Creek, as well as a developed camp-site, with a picnic table, grill and toilet, opposite the Needle at the end of the Curecanti Creek trail.

Pine Creek Trail (2 miles round-trip) 180 ft. elevation change. Access by trail-head on U.S. Hwy 50, 1 mile west of junction with Co. Hwy 92. Boat launch is at the end of the trail.
