= Carson Peak (Colorado) =

Mountain in the state of Colorado

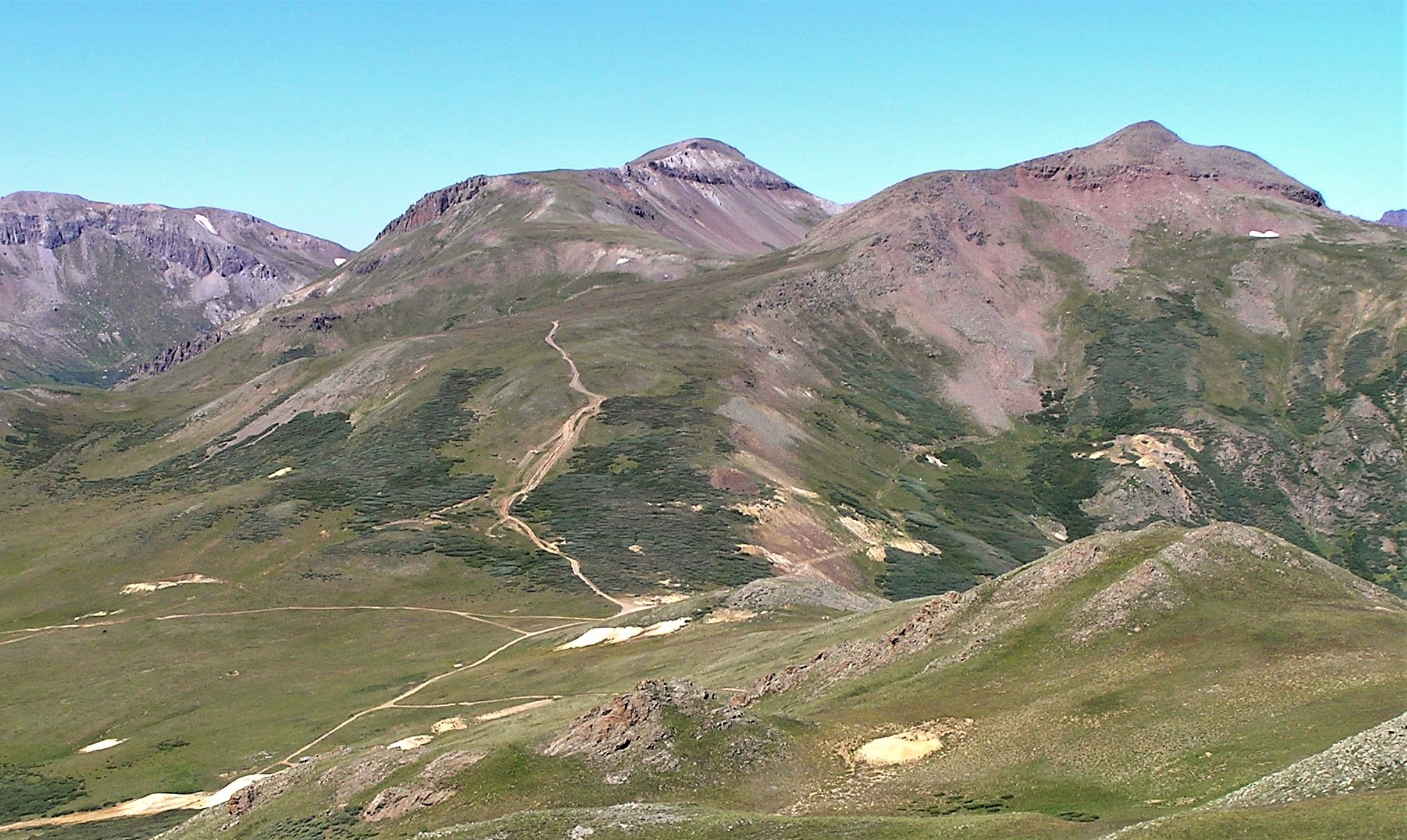
- East aspect, centered (Bent Peak to the right)

Highest point
- Elevation: 13,662 ft (4,164 m)
- Prominence: 1,222 ft (372 m)
- Isolation: 3.46 mi (5.57 km)
- Coordinates: 37°51′27″N 107°24′07″W

Naming
- Etymology: Christopher J. Carson

Geography
- Location within Colorado Location within the United States
- Country: United States
- State: Colorado
- County: Hinsdale
- Parent range: Rocky Mountains; San Juan Mountains
- Topo map: USGS Pole Creek Mountain

Climbing
- Easiest route: class 2 hiking

Carson Peak is a 13,662-foot-elevation (4,164-meter) summit in Hinsdale County, Colorado, United States.

== Description ==
Carson Peak is located 14.5 miles (23.3 km) east-northeast of the community of Silverton, on land administered by Gunnison National Forest and Rio Grande National Forest. It is situated on the Continental Divide in the San Juan Mountains, which are a subrange of the Rocky Mountains. Carson Peak ranks as the 23rd-highest peak in Hinsdale County and the 167th-highest in Colorado. Precipitation runoff from the mountain's south slope drains into headwaters of Lost Trail Creek which is a tributary of the Rio Grande, whereas the north slope drains to the Lake Fork Gunnison River. Topographic relief is significant as the summit rises 1,740 feet (530 meters) above Lost Trail Creek in one mile (1.6 km), and over 4,200 feet (1,300 meters) above Lake Fork in three miles (4.8 km). The Continental Divide Trail traverses the south slope of the peak, and an ascent to the summit involves hiking 9.3 miles with 3,030 feet of elevation gain. The mountain's toponym has been officially adopted by the United States Board on Geographic Names. Carson, the mining camp (now a ghost town) located two miles east-northeast of the peak at the head of Wager Gulch was named after Christopher J. Carson, who discovered silver and gold here in 1881.

== Climate ==
According to the Köppen climate classification system, Carson Peak is located in an alpine subarctic climate zone with cold, snowy winters, and cool to warm summers. Due to its altitude, it receives precipitation all year, as snow in winter and as thunderstorms in summer, with a dry period in late spring.

== See also ==
- Mountains of Hinsdale County, Colorado
- Thirteener
