= Blue Creek (Gunnison River tributary) =

Tributary of the Gunnison River

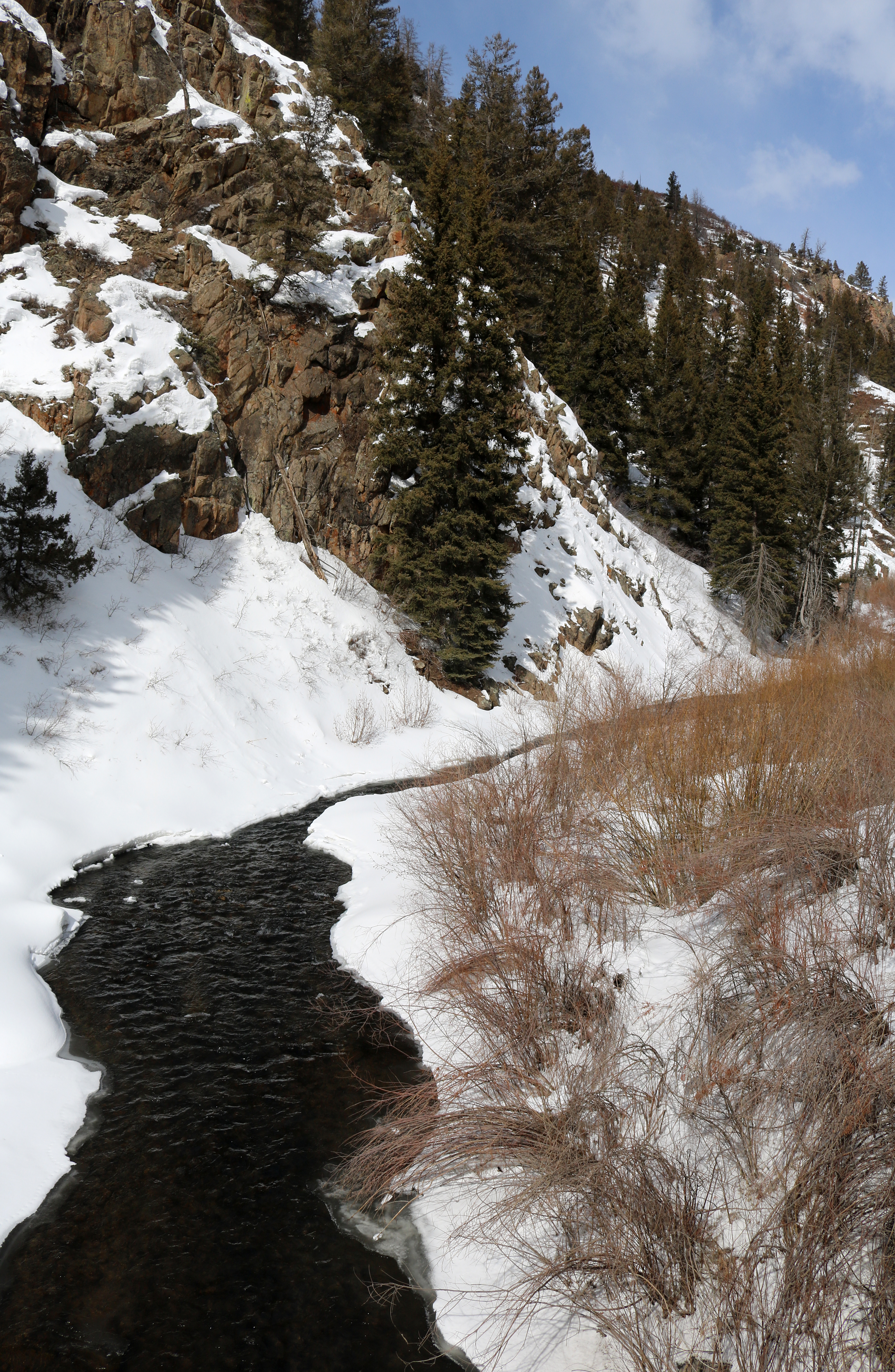
- The headwaters of Blue Creek in Blue Creek Canyon along U.S. Highway 50 in Gunnison County, Colorado

- The creek's location in Colorado

Physical characteristics
- Source
  - location: Blue Creek Canyon
  - coordinates: 38°02′31″N 107°24′16″W
- Mouth
  - location: Morrow Point Reservoir (Gunnison River)
  - coordinates: 38°27′02″N 107°27′16″W
  - elevation: 7,949 feet (2,423 meters)
- Length: 3.5 miles (5.6 kilometers) long.

Basin features
- Progression: Gunnison River—Colorado River

Blue Creek is a tributary of the Gunnison River in Gunnison County, Colorado. It forms at the confluence of Little Blue Creek and Big Blue Creek adjacent to the intersection of U.S. Highway 50 and Alpine Plateau Road (Gunnison County Road 867) in Blue Creek Canyon.

== Course ==
After it starts at the confluence of little Blue Creek and Big Blue Creek, Blue Creek flows under a bridge on Highway 50, it then flows north along the highway's west side, and then separates from the highway heading north until it eventually empties into Morrow Point Reservoir at the Curecanti Needle. The creek is 3.5 miles (5.6 kilometers) long.

== Other ==
Blue Creek is one of the two primary stream inflows to Morrow Point Reservoir (the other one is Curecanti Creek). Its mouth lies within the Curecanti National Recreation Area. The portion of the stream within the recreation area has good fly fishing and provides the best chance of catching fish, but access here is only by boat.

== See also ==
- List of rivers of Colorado
