= Crystal Reservoir =

Lake on the Gunnison River in Colorado, United States

- Location within Colorado Location within the United States
- Location: Montrose County, Colorado
- Coordinates: 38°28′52″N 107°34′53″W
- Type: Reservoir
- Part of: Wayne N. Aspinall Storage Unit (Bureau of Reclamation)
- Primary inflows: Gunnison River, Cimarron River, Crystal Creek, Mesa Creek
- Managing agency: Curecanti National Recreation Area (National Park Service)
- First flooded: 1976
- Max. length: 6 mi (9.7 km)
- Surface area: 340 acres (140 ha)
- Water volume: 26,000 acre-feet (32 GL)
- Surface elevation: 6,755 ft (2,059 m)
- Settlements: Gunnison, Colorado; Montrose, Colorado
- Website: https://www.nps.gov/cure/index.htm

Crystal Reservoir is a 340-acre artificial reservoir on the Gunnison River in western Colorado. Located in the upper Black Canyon of the Gunnison, the lake was created in 1976 by the U.S. Bureau of Reclamation as part of a larger plan to impound the upper section of the Gunnison for the generation of hydroelectric power, water storage, and public recreation. Crystal Reservoir is managed by the National Park Service as an element of the Curecanti National Recreation Area. Located at the far western end of Curecanti, Crystal Reservoir is the smallest, least developed, and least accessible of the three reservoirs within the park.

== Background ==
Crystal Reservoir is part of the Wayne N. Aspinall Unit of the Colorado River Storage Project, a Bureau of Reclamation project that retains the waters of the Colorado River and its tributaries, such as the Gunnison, for agricultural and municipal use. Crystal Reservoir was created by the impoundment of the Gunnison River approximately 6 miles west of Morrow Point Dam by Crystal Dam, a 323-ft. concrete double-arch dam built by the Bureau of Reclamation. The last of three reservoirs impounded for the Aspinall Unit, construction on Crystal Dam began in 1973, 5 years after the completion of Morrow Point Dam and 7 years after the completion of Blue Mesa Dam. The westernmost of the three reservoirs, Crystal is the last impoundment before the river enters the deep and dangerous Black Canyon of the Gunnison.

== Recreation ==
Crystal Reservoir is part of the Curecanti National Recreation Area, a National Park Service administered area responsible for developing and managing recreation facilities on the three reservoirs of the Aspinall Unit.

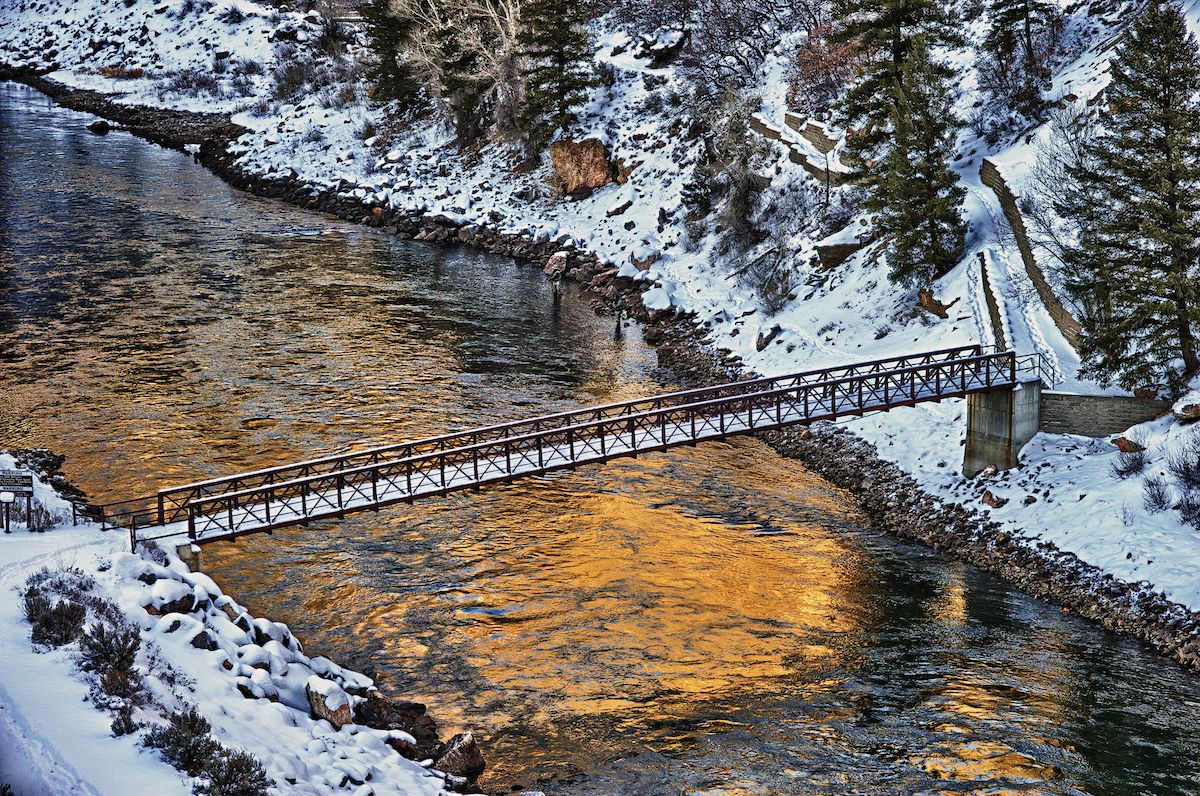
Bridge over Crystal Reservoir at Mesa Creek Trailhead near Cimarron.

Recreational opportunities at Crystal include boating (hand-carried craft only), camping, and hiking. There are two small developed areas near the reservoir, Mesa Creek Trailhead and Crystal Creek Trailhead. Mesa Creek Trailhead is located immediately west of Point Morrow Dam, and can be accessed from a one-mile road running north of U.S. 50 at Cimarron.

Preserved rail bridge over Cimarron Creek

Hand-launched watercraft can be launched into Crystal from Mesa Creek. A single boat-in campsite is located approximately 4 miles west of Mesa Creek at the mouth of Crystal Creek. Mesa Creek is also the trailhead for the Mesa Creek Trail, a fairly to moderately strenuous 1.5 mile round trip that crosses the reservoir on a footbridge and travels west along the north shore. Though Mesa Creek is a day-use facility, developed campsites are available at nearby Cimarron. Crystal Creek Trailhead is located on Colorado Highway 92, 24 miles west of Blue Mesa Dam and offers access to the 5-mile (round trip) Crystal Creek Trail. Moderately strenuous, Crystal Creek trail does reach the water but ends at an overlook 1800 ft. above the reservoir.

== See also ==
- List of largest reservoirs of Colorado
- Colorado River Storage Project
- Crystal Dam
- Curecanti National Recreation Area
- Blue Mesa Reservoir
- Morrow Point Reservoir
