= Lake San Cristobal =

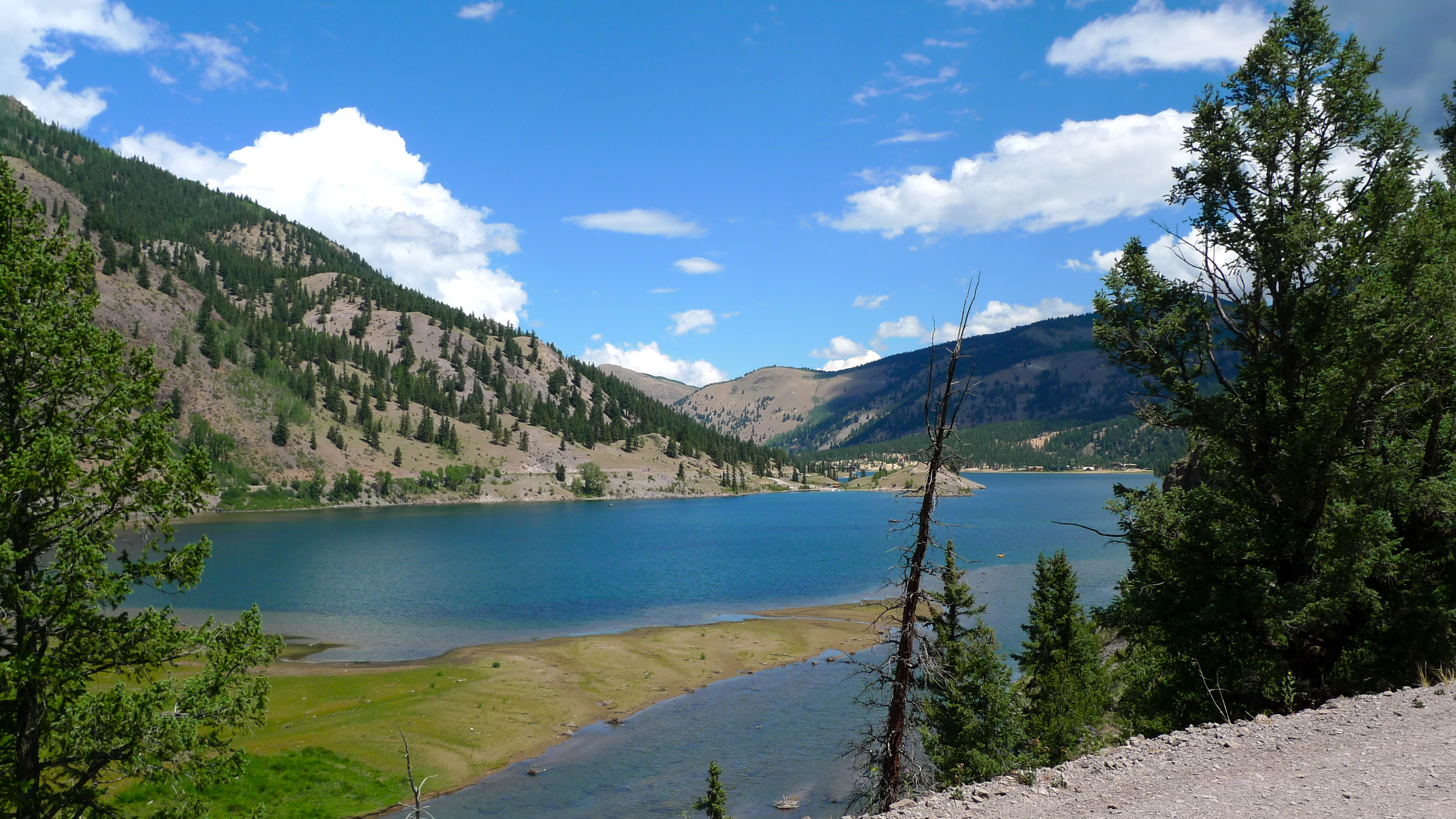

- Location within Colorado
- Location: Hinsdale County, Colorado
- Coordinates: 37°58′15″N 107°17′27″W
- Lake type: Barrier lake
- Basin countries: United States
- Max. length: 3.3 km (2.1 mi)
- Surface area: 1.34 km^{2} (0.52 sq mi)
- Max. depth: 27 m (89 ft)
- Water volume: 14,000,000 m^{3} (490,000,000 cu ft)
- Surface elevation: 2,744 m (9,003 ft)

Lake San Cristobal is a lake in the U.S. state of Colorado. Located in the San Juan Mountains at an elevation of 9,003 feet (2,744 m), the freshwater lake is 2.1 miles (3.4 km) long, up to 89 feet (27 m) deep, has a surface area of 0.52 square miles (1.3 km^{2}), and holds about 11,000 acre-feet (14,000,000 m^{3}) of water. The town of Lake City, a few miles to the north, is named after Lake San Cristobal. The name San Cristóbal means Saint Christopher in the Spanish language. Many old silver mines are near the lake and it is very clean and well kept, and stocked with Rainbow Trout.

== Geology ==
Lake San Cristobal was formed about 700 years ago when the first Slumgullion Earthflow, a natural landslide, created a dam across the Lake Fork of the Gunnison River. Natural landslide dams are usually short-lived, but some have been known to fail after long periods—131 years in the case of Lake Yashinkul in the former Soviet Union. This prompted the United States Geological Survey to investigate the possibility that the Lake San Cristobal dam might fail. Based on its non-porous composition and the fact that part of the dam's natural spillway is actually cut into bedrock and not the material deposited by the landslide, the USGS concluded the dam is stable. Sediments washing down via the Lake Fork and Slumgullion Creek are slowly filling in the lake, but are not expected to affect the dam's stability. If sedimentation continues at the past rate, the lake will have completely filled with sediment in about 2,500 years.

== Development ==
In the 1950s, the USGS studied Lake San Cristobal as a possible site for an artificial embankment dam. Such a dam would have been built near the present outlet and spanned the entire valley. This was rejected out of the concern that the upper, active part of the Slumgullion Earthflow could one day reach the dam site, and the possibility that the added pore pressure of the deeper water could reactivate the lower part of the slide. Minor adjustments to the lake level have been made over the years. Hinsdale County constructed a small rock and wooden dam at the lake outlet in 1954, but it began to deteriorate by the 1970s. As of 2009, the water level is controlled by the seasonal addition and removal of boulders at the lake outlet. The county has proposed a modification of the outlet structure which would allow the controlled storage and release of up to 960 acre-feet (1,180,000 m^{3}) water. According to an analysis submitted to the county, this will have a similar effect on the lake level as the previous practice.
