= Crystal Dam =

Dam on the Gunnison River in Colorado, United States

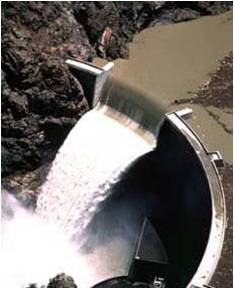
- Crystal Dam with overflowing spillway

- Location within Colorado
- Interactive map of Crystal Dam
- Location: Cimarron, Gunnison County, Colorado, USA
- Coordinates: 38°30′38.48″N 107°37′30.60″W
- Construction began: 1972
- Opening date: 1977
- Operator: U.S. Bureau of Reclamation

Dam and spillways
- Type of dam: Concrete thin arch
- Impounds: Gunnison River
- Height: 323 feet (98 m)
- Length: 620 feet (190 m)
- Width (crest): 10 feet (3.0 m)
- Width (base): 29 feet (8.8 m)
- Dam volume: 154,400 cu yd (118,000 m^{3})
- Spillway type: Ungated ogee-crest to plunge pool

Reservoir
- Creates: Crystal Reservoir
- Total capacity: 26,000 acre-feet (0.032 km^{3})
- Catchment area: 3,970 sq mi (10,300 km^{2})
- Surface area: 301 acres (122 ha)

Power Station
- Hydraulic head: 209 ft (64 m)
- Turbines: 1 x 31.57 MW Francis turbine
- Installed capacity: 31.5 MW
- Annual generation: 137,950,098 KWh

Crystal Dam is a 323-foot-tall (98 m), double-curvature, concrete, thin arch dam located 6 miles downstream from Morrow Point Dam on the Gunnison River in Colorado, United States. Crystal Dam is the newest of the three dams in Curecanti National Recreation Area; construction on the dam was finished in 1976. The dam impounds Crystal Reservoir. Crystal Dam and Reservoir are part of the Bureau of Reclamation's Wayne N. Aspinall Unit of the Colorado River Storage Project, which retains the waters of the Gunnison River and its tributaries for agricultural and municipal use in the American Southwest. The dam's primary purpose is hydroelectric power generation.

== Description ==
Crystal Dam, like the higher Morrow Point Dam farther upstream, is a thin-shell arch dam, primarily planned to generate hydroelectric power. Unlike its upstream companions, excess water spills over the top of the dam through a notched-out, ungated spillway that can create a 227-foot (69 m) waterfall in times of overflow. Under normal conditions the river flows through an 11.5 feet (3.5 m) diameter penstock to the 28 MW turbine. The dam is deep within the Black Canyon of the Gunnison in pre-Cambrian metamorphic rock.

== History ==
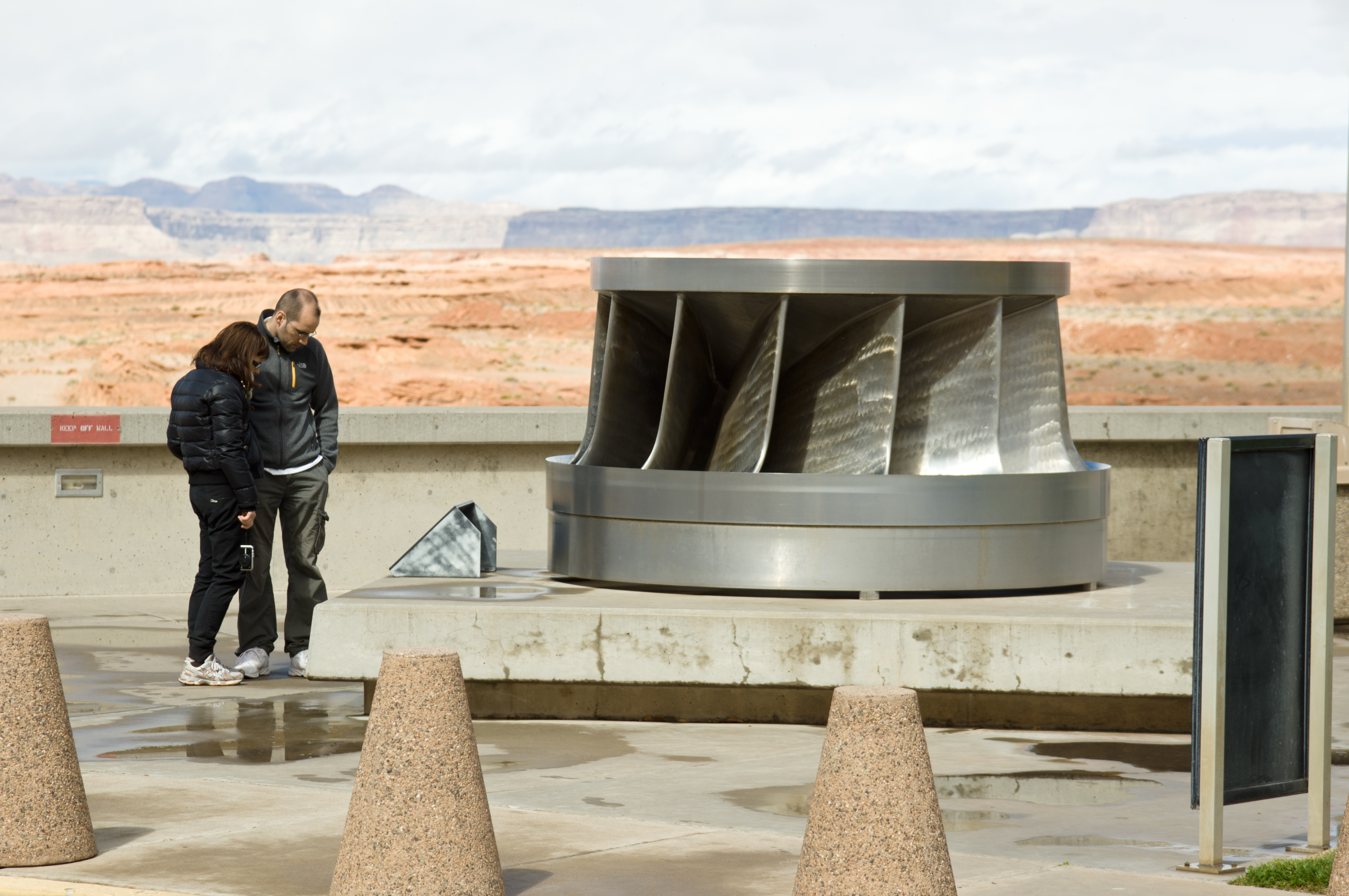
A Francis-type turbine removed in 1989 from Crystal Dam Powerplant is currently displayed at Glen Canyon Dam.

Crystal Dam was the last of the three dams in the Aspinall Unit of the Colorado River Storage Project to be completed. Crystal Dam's design and construction lagged behind Morrow Point and Blue Mesa dams. Construction started in 1964 on a materials borrow pit, with construction at the damsite beginning in 1965 for an access road and exploratory drilling. Work then stopped for five years. Initially planned as an earth-fill dam, the design was changed to a double-curvature, thin-shell concrete arch dam. After an initial bidding process in which all bid were rejected as too high, a contract for the diversion tunnel was awarded in 1972, which was holed through the same year. The construction contract for the dam itself was awarded to the J.F. Shea Company in June 1973. Cofferdam work continued into 1974, encountering problems with leakage though the upstream cofferdam; 24-inch (61 cm) wells were drilled below the cofferdam to intercept water. In the meantime, the dam foundation was excavated, with first concrete placement in June. Excavation and concrete work for the powerplant started the same year. Concrete work stopped in November, and resumed in April 1975. Work was behind schedule; the dam was supposed to be completed by December 1975. Concrete work resumed in April 1976, with final completion of the dam structure on August 30, 1976. Filling operations in the reservoir began on March 14, 1977, permanently blocking the diversion tunnel on April 12. The powerplant was not completed until 1978, the victim of a fire in the contractor's warehouse that destroyed many electrical components intended for the plant.

Because of Crystal Dam's then-new design, and as a result of the failure of the contemporary Teton Dam in 1976, Crystal Dam was inspected in 1978 by divers to verify the integrity of the structure.
