= Lake Fork Gunnison River =

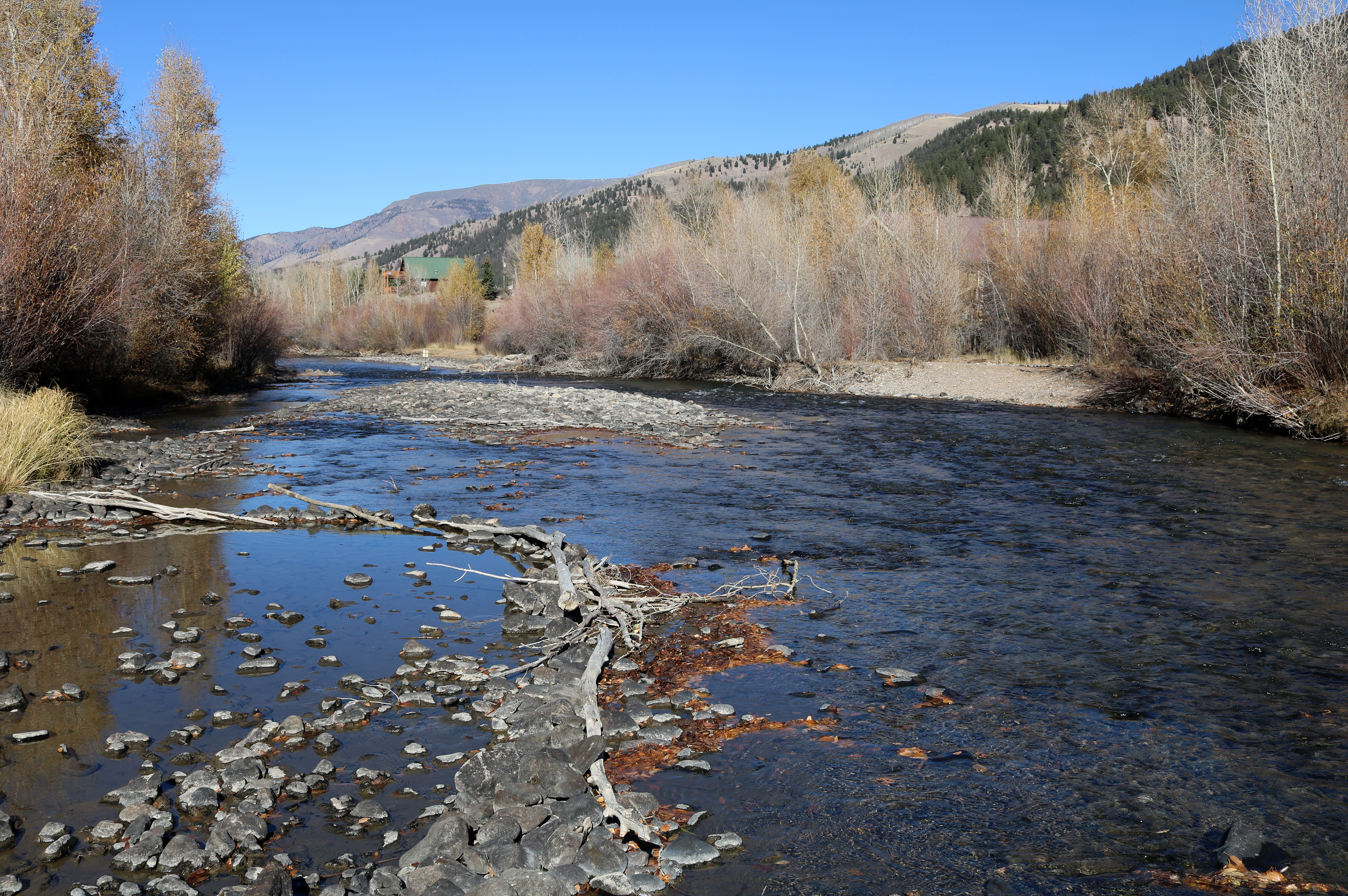
- The river in Lake City.

Physical characteristics
- Source
  - location: Sloan Lake
  - coordinates: 37°54′16″N 107°30′49″W
  - elevation: 12,910 ft (3,930 m)
- Mouth
  - location: Confluence with Gunnison River
  - coordinates: 38°27′38″N 107°19′19″W
  - elevation: 7,523 ft (2,293 m)

Basin features
- Progression: Gunnison—Colorado

Lake Fork Gunnison River (or Lake Fork) is a 64.7-mile-long (104.1 km) tributary of the Gunnison River in Colorado. The river's source is Sloan Lake near Handies Peak in the San Juan Mountains of Hinsdale County. Lake Fork flows through Lake San Cristobal and Lake City before a confluence with the Gunnison River in Blue Mesa Reservoir.

== See also ==
- List of rivers of Colorado
- List of tributaries of the Colorado River
