= Colorado River Storage Project =

US Bureau of Reclamation project

Colorado River Storage Project Act
- Long title: An Act to authorize the Secretary of the Interior to construct, operate, and maintain the Colorado River storage project and participating projects, and for other purposes.
- Acronyms (colloquial): CRSPA
- Enacted by: the 84th United States Congress
- Effective: April 11, 1956

Citations
- Public law: Public Law 84-485
- Statutes at Large: 70 Stat. 105

Codification
- U.S.C. sections created: 43 U.S.C. ch. 12B (§ 620 et seq.)

Legislative history
- Introduced in the Senate as S. 500 by D‑NM Clinton Presba Andersonth on January 18, 1955; Committee consideration by Senate Committee on Interior and Insular Affairs; Passed the Senate on April 20, 1955 (58–23); Passed the House as the H.R. 3383 on March 1, 1956 (256–136); Reported by the joint conference committee on March 1956; agreed to by the House on March 28, 1956 (Agreed to conference report) and by the Senate on March 28, 1956 (Voice vote (agreed to conference report)); Signed into law by President Dwight D. Eisenhower on April 11, 1956

Major amendments
- Colorado River Basin Project Act (1968)

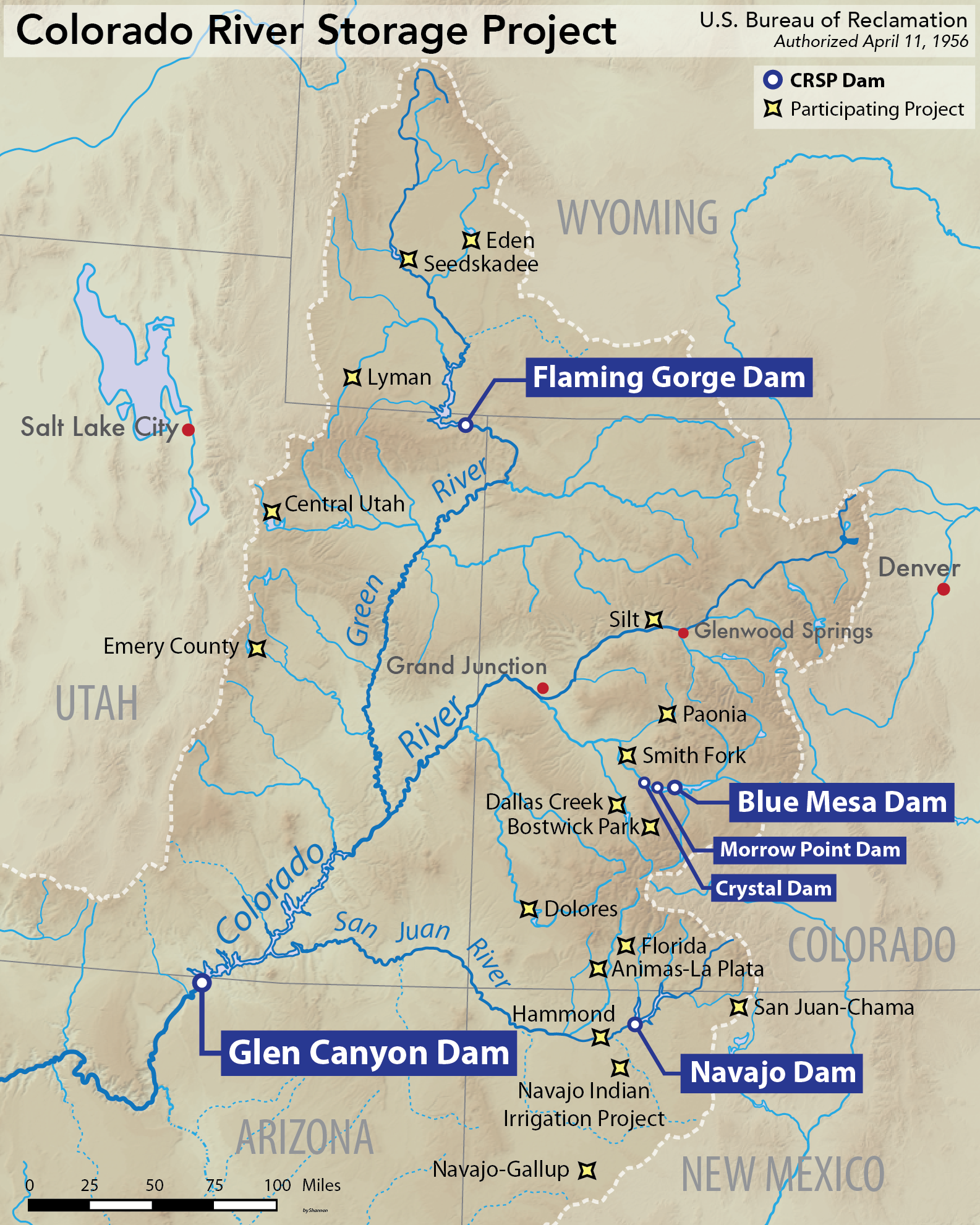
Map showing the locations of CRSP dams and participating projects

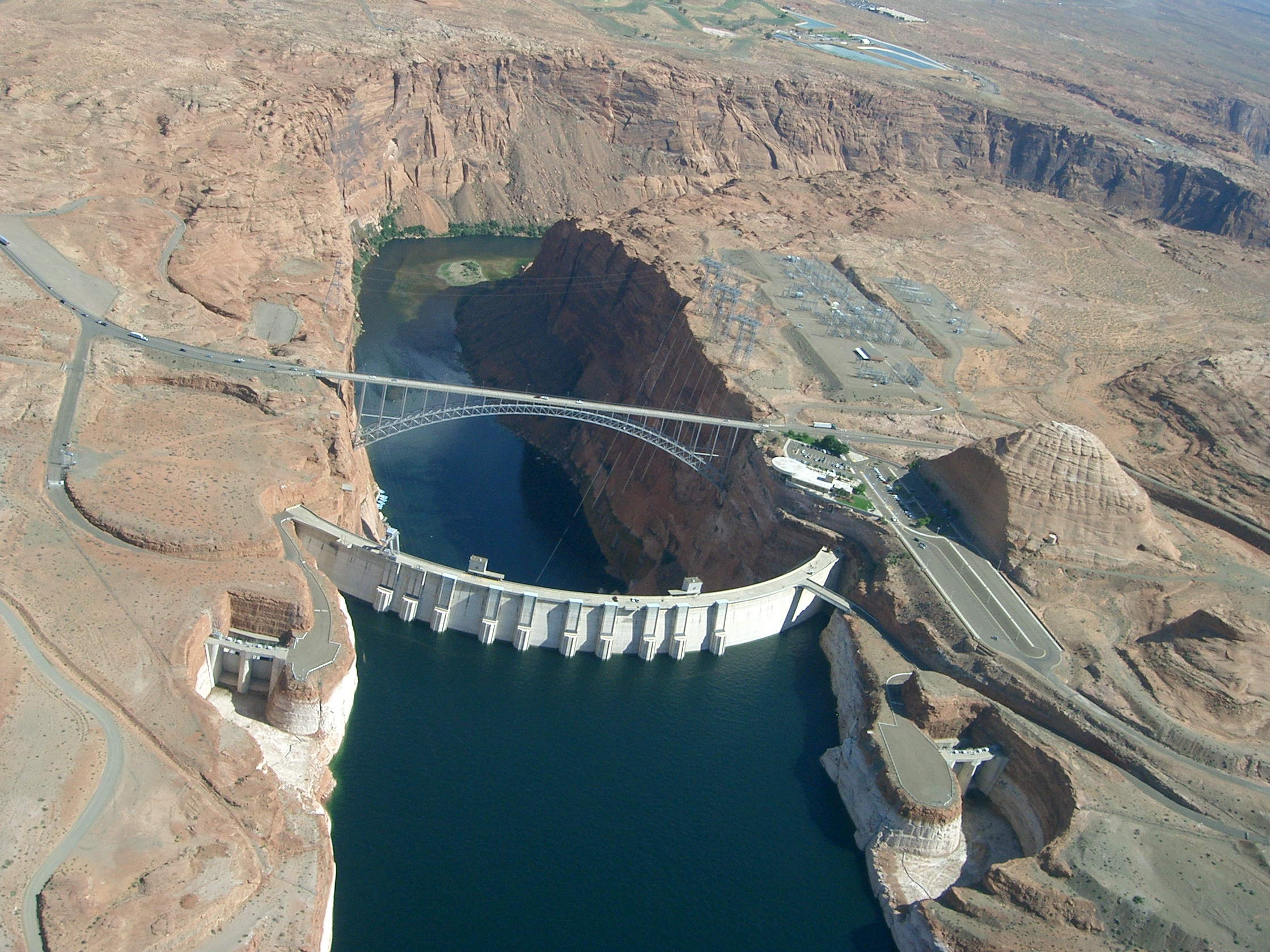
Glen Canyon Dam and Lake Powell near Page, Arizona. The dam and lake are major components in the Colorado River Storage Project's attempt to regulate the flow of the Colorado River.

The Colorado River Storage Project is a United States Bureau of Reclamation project designed to oversee the development of the upper basin of the Colorado River. The project provides hydroelectric power, flood control and water storage for participating states along the upper portion of the Colorado River and its major tributaries.

Since its inception in 1956, the project has grown to include the participation of several related water management projects throughout the river's basin. The project's original scope, and primary focus, are the upper Colorado River itself, the Green River, the San Juan River, and the Gunnison River.

Participating states are Arizona, Utah, New Mexico, Colorado and Wyoming.

== History ==
Attempts at managing the water supply in the upper Colorado River basin were first recorded in 1854 at Fort Supply in Wyoming, when water was diverted from Blacks Fork to irrigate local lands. Subsequent diversions of the waters in the Colorado basin led to preliminary investigations of means to develop the system as early as 1902 when the Bureau of Reclamation, then known as the Reclamation Service, was established.

Serious consideration for the project began when the Colorado River Compact was signed in 1922 by the participating states, as well as the lower Colorado River states, California and Nevada. As a stipulation of that compact, the upper basin states were required to ensure an annual flow of no less than 7,500,000 acre-feet (9.3 km^{3}) be delivered to the lower basin states. However, the annual flow of the Colorado River at Lee's Ferry in Arizona, the established dividing point, was extremely erratic, ranging from 4,000,000 acre-feet (4.9 km^{3}) to 22,000,000 acre-feet (27 km^{3}). This led to an inability of the upper basin states to meet the minimum delivery requirements to the lower states in dry years, and a loss of significant surpluses in wet years.

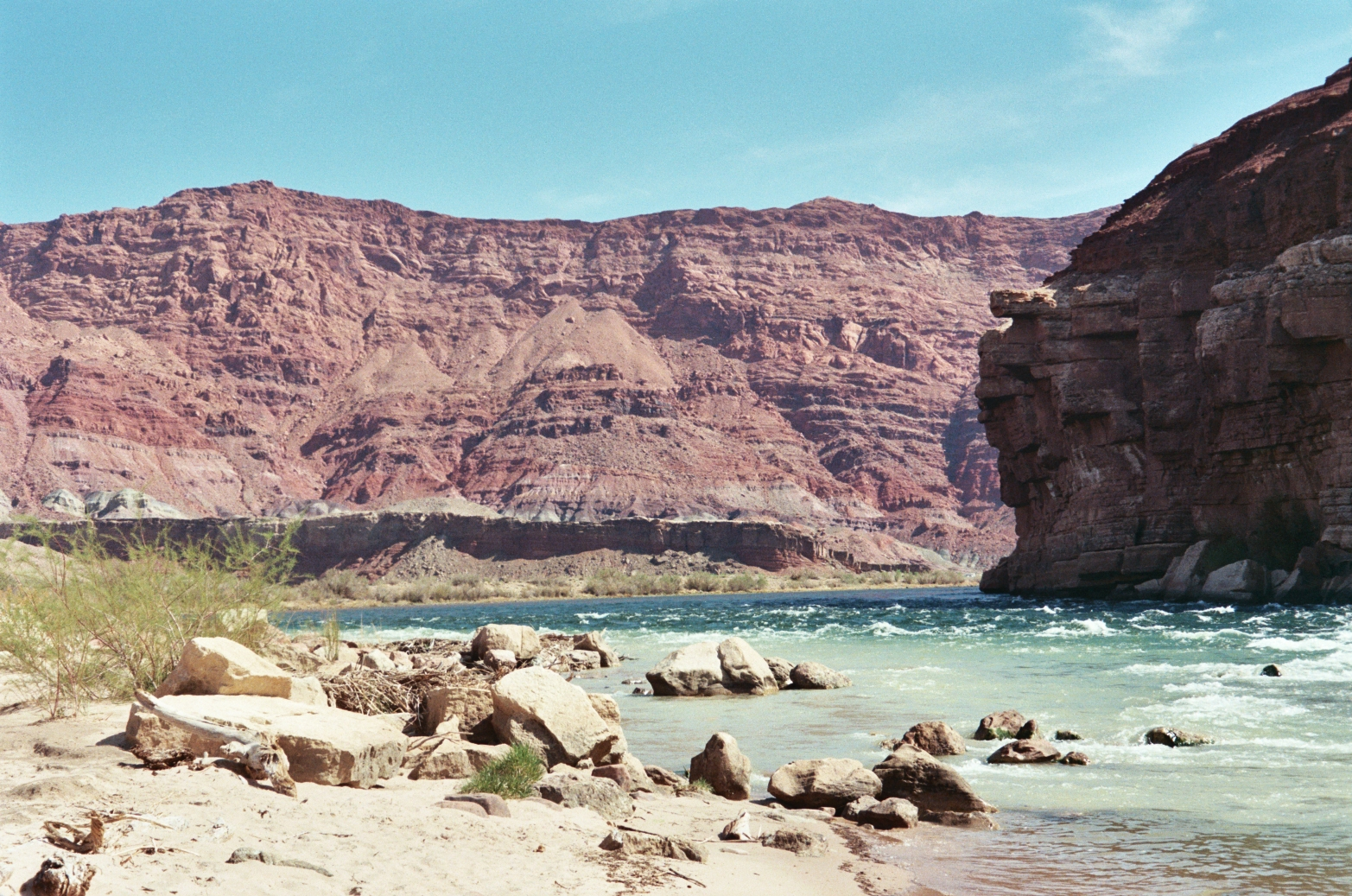
Lee's Ferry, Arizona, is the dividing point between the upper and lower Colorado River basins.

In order to regulate the flow of the Colorado and ensure compliance with the compact, a study was undertaken that determined a series of dams and reservoirs on the river and its tributaries would be necessary. A joint effort between the Upper Colorado River Commission, the Bureau of Reclamation and other federal agencies delivered a report with proposed projects to the United States Congress in 1950.

Among the proposed projects was a dam to be constructed on the Green River in Echo Park, in Dinosaur National Monument in Colorado. The proposal for Echo Park Dam created controversy and sparked the ire of Sierra Club director David Brower, who embarked on a national campaign to rescue the park. As part of a compromise, the proposed dam was stricken from the project and replaced with another dam in Glen Canyon, Arizona. Brower, who had not personally visited Glen Canyon prior to the compromise, later lamented the deal, describing it as "the worst mistake of his career" and "the biggest sin I ever committed".

A revised, and slightly pared down, version of the plan was passed into law by Congress in 1956. The legislation called for the construction of dams, reservoirs and related works at Curecanti in Colorado, Flaming Gorge in Wyoming, Navajo in New Mexico and Glen Canyon in Arizona. All but the Navajo project were to include power generation capabilities; the Navajo project was intended as flood control only. Also included in the legislation were several related projects in the Colorado River basin.

== Project scope ==
The Colorado River Storage Project is made up of four separate units, spread along the upper Colorado basin and its major tributaries. Also included are several participating projects located throughout the system.

As a whole, the system provides a storage capacity of approximately 34,000,000 acre-feet (42 km^{3}) of water. This capacity is released to meet the Colorado River Compact's delivery requirements during periods of low flow in the system. Additionally, three of the units provide hydroelectric power to major markets in the southwest.

Lee's Ferry in Arizona serves as the southern boundary point for the project, which encompasses the Colorado River upstream from this point and all tributaries.

=== Glen Canyon Unit ===
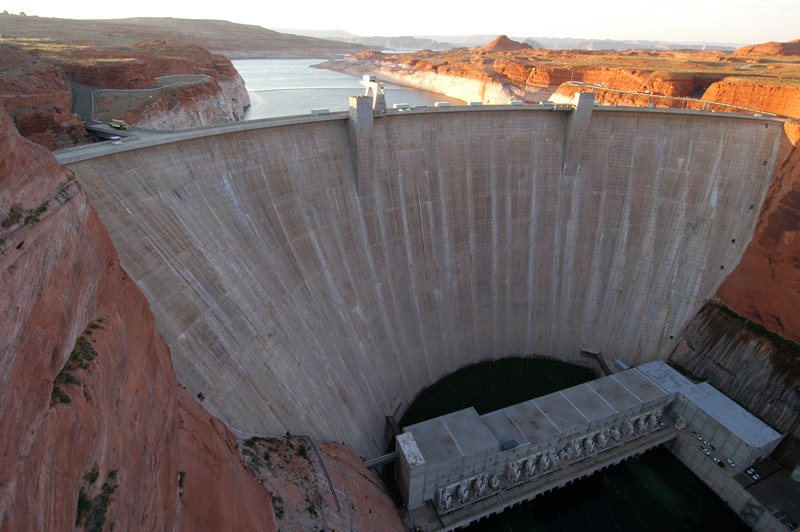
Glen Canyon Dam, with Lake Powell in the background

The Glen Canyon Unit, which consists of the Glen Canyon Dam, Lake Powell and the Glen Canyon Powerplant, is the largest and most important unit of the system. While the dam is located near Page in northern Arizona, the majority of Lake Powell resides in southern Utah. With a total storage capacity of 27,000,000 acre-feet (33 km^{3}) of water in Lake Powell, the Glen Canyon Unit accounts for over 64% of the system's overall water storage capacity. The 1,296 megawatt capacity of the dam's hydroelectric generators accounts for almost 75% of the overall generating capacity of the project.

In spite of its importance to the system, the Glen Canyon Unit has also been the source of controversy even before it began operating in 1964. Sierra Club director David Brower, who was partially responsible for the location of the dam as part of a compromise, later regretted the decision. Former Arizona Senator Barry Goldwater, who was a proponent of the dam in the beginning, later recanted his opinion and admitted that he had regretted supporting the project. Calls for the draining of Lake Powell and the restoration of Glen Canyon by environmental groups such as Sierra Club have resulted in the founding of several advocacy groups for the cause such as Living Rivers and Friends of Glen Canyon, as well as opposition groups such as Friends of Lake Powell.

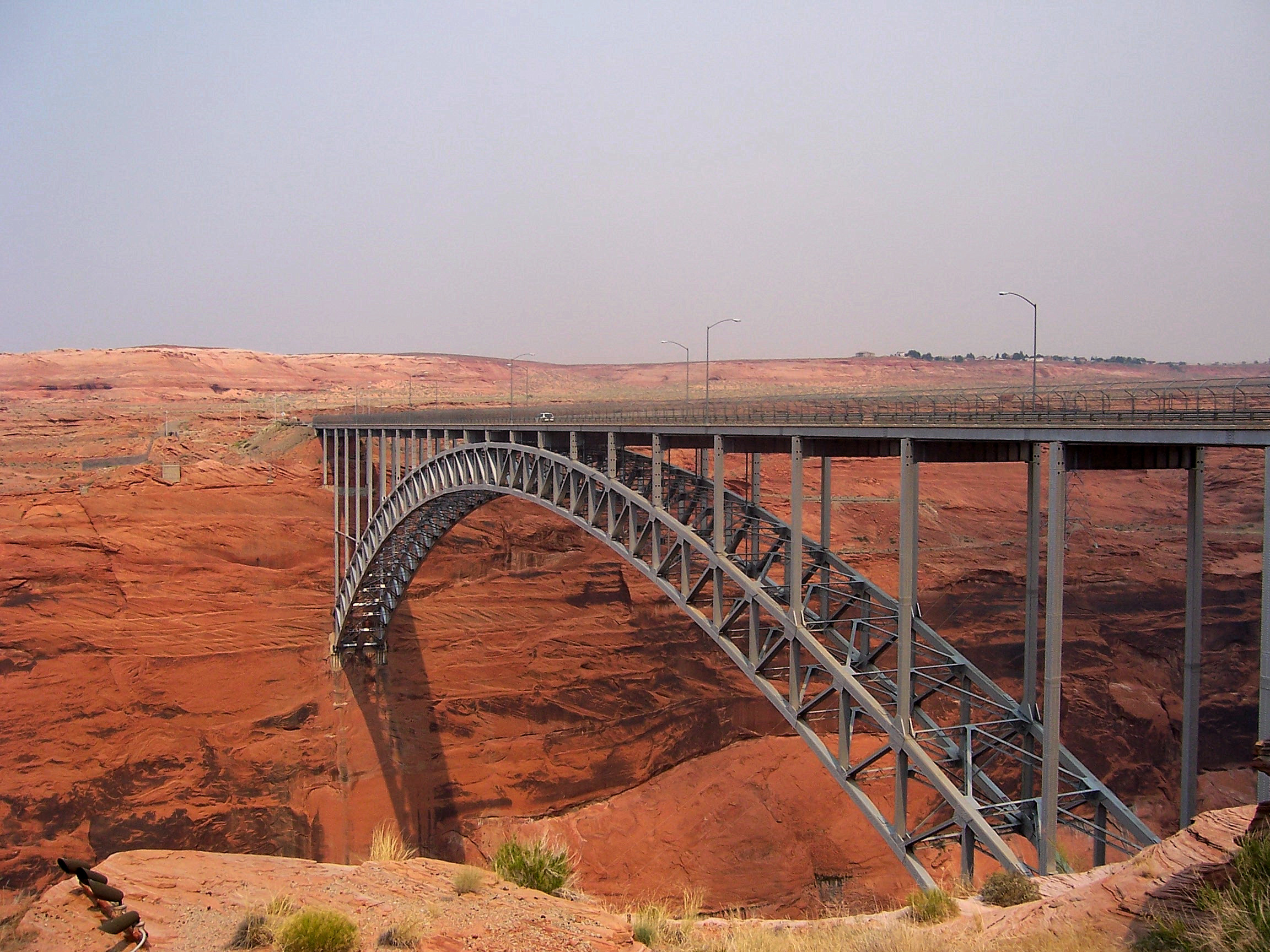
Glen Canyon Bridge

Given the importance of the unit to the project as well as its impact as a tourist destination to the region, restoration efforts face significant opposition and there currently exist no plans to cease operations at Glen Canyon.

Not directly a part of the project but built as a direct result of it, the Glen Canyon Dam Bridge was constructed over the river in 1959. At the time of its completion it was the highest arch bridge in the world. It currently serves as one of only two bridges to cross the Colorado River between Lake Mead and Lake Powell, carrying the majority of the traffic between northern Arizona and southern Utah.

=== Flaming Gorge Unit ===
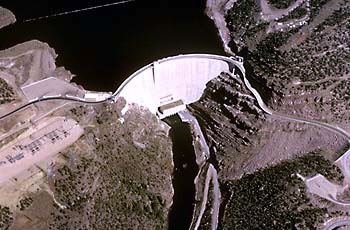
Flaming Gorge Dam and reservoir from the air

The Flaming Gorge Unit consists of the Flaming Gorge Dam and the Flaming Gorge Reservoir, and the dam's powerplant. The dam impounds the Green River near Dutch John, Utah. Portions of the reservoir spill over into Southern Wyoming near the city of Green River.

Completed in 1964, the dam provides water storage and hydroelectric generation, as well as flood control on the Green River, the primary tributary to the Colorado. The powerplant in the dam has a capacity of 153 megawatts or about 8.5% of the entire system.

=== Navajo Unit ===
The Navajo Unit consists of the Navajo Dam and the Navajo Lake reservoir. The dam impounds the San Juan River near Farmington, New Mexico.

The dam was completed in 1963, and was actually the first of the units in the project to be completed. Unlike the subsequent dams, Navajo Dam did not have any power generating capacity when built. A small plant with a capacity of 32 MW was installed in 1983 in conjunction with the city of Farmington to generate local power.

=== Aspinall Unit ===
The Aspinall Unit consists of three dams and reservoirs on the Gunnison River in Colorado. It is the only unit in the project to be made up of more than one dam or reservoir.

The Aspinall Unit was originally named the Curecanti Unit, but was renamed for former congressman Wayne N. Aspinall in 1980. Aspinall had been a strong proponent of water reclamation projects in Colorado and the western US in general, and was seen as a key opponent to David Brower in the fight to enact the Colorado River Storage Project. Brower was known to have fought regularly with Aspinall, going so far as to state that he had seen "dream after dream dashed on the stony continents of Wayne Aspinall".

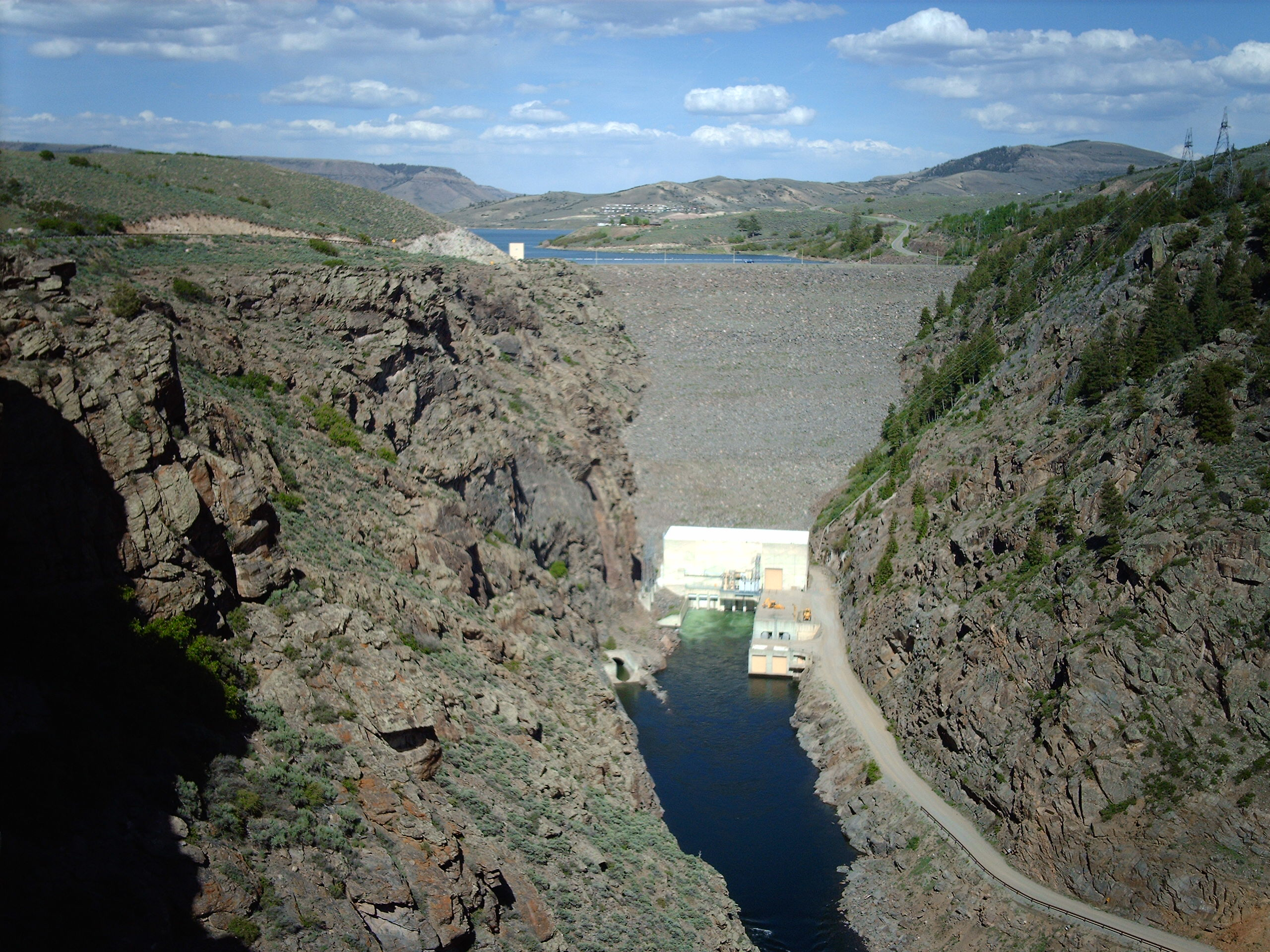
Blue Mesa Dam

As a whole, the Aspinall Unit has a generating capacity of about 290 megawatts, or about 17% of the entire Colorado River Storage Project, making it the second most productive unit after Glen Canyon.

==== Blue Mesa Dam ====
The Blue Mesa Dam impounds the Gunnison River upstream of the Morrow Point Dam forming the Blue Mesa Reservoir, making it the first dam the river passes through. The dam was completed in 1966 and has an electric generating capacity of 86,400 kilowatts, or about 30% of the Aspinall Unit's generating capacity.

==== Morrow Point Dam ====
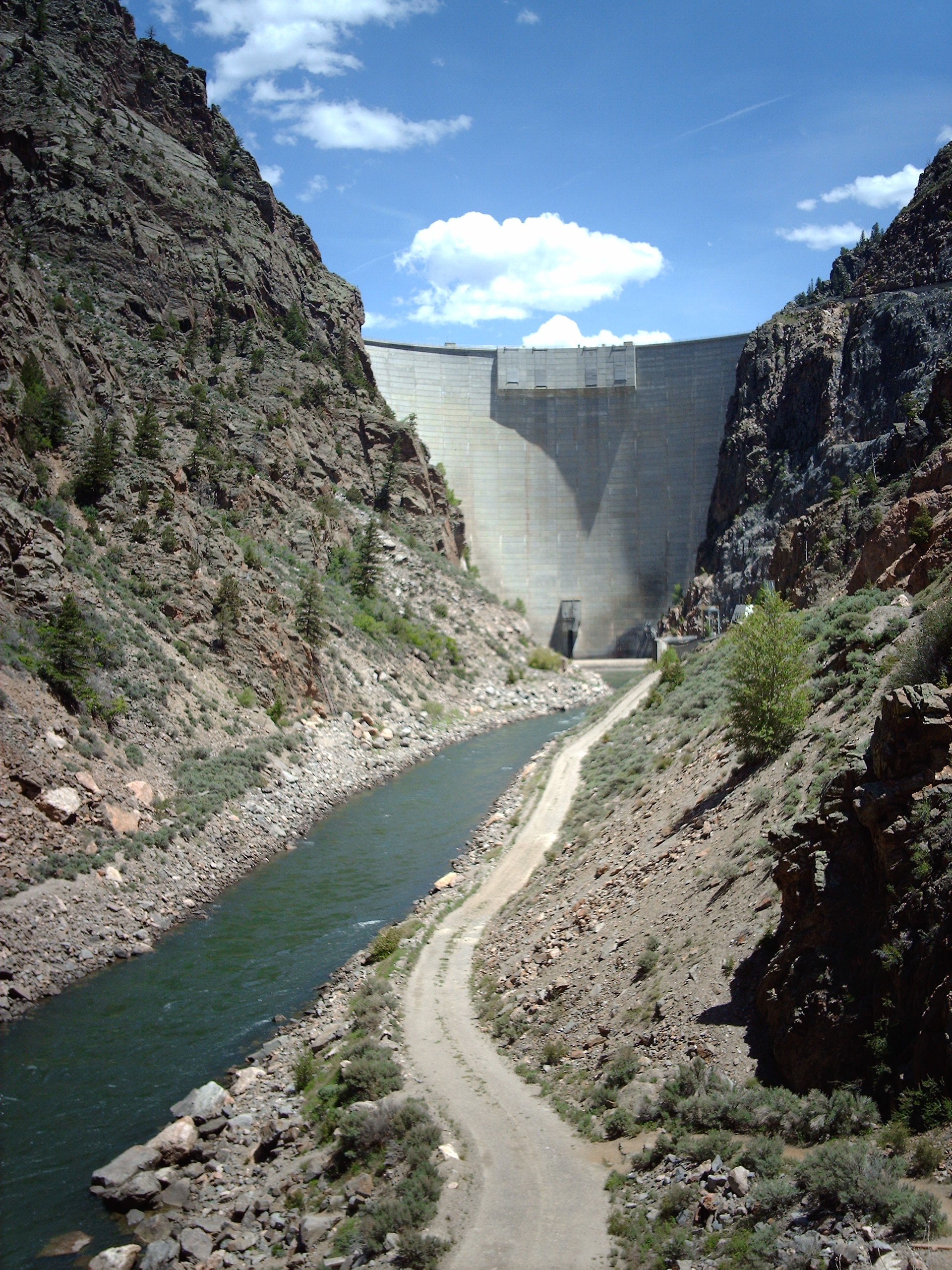
Gunnison River downstream from the Morrow Point Dam

The Morrow Point Dam impounds the Gunnison River downstream from the Blue Mesa Dam but upstream of the Crystal Dam, forming the Morrow Point Reservoir, putting it in the center of the Aspinall Unit. Completed in 1968, Morrow Point is the largest and most productive of the Aspinall dams. Morrow Point has a generating capacity of 173,334 kilowatts, making it the second most productive dam in the entire Colorado River Storage Project system. It provides about 60% of the Aspinall Unit's generating capacity.

The Morrow Point Dam is the first thin-arch concrete dam to be built in the Colorado River Storage Project system.

==== Crystal Dam ====
The Crystal Dam impounds the Gunnison River about 6 miles (10 km) downstream from the Morrow Point Dam, making it the final dam in the Aspinall Unit. Completed in 1976, it is the last dam in both the Aspinall Unit and the Colorado River Storage Project to be completed, marking the final completion of the system as a whole.

Crystal Dam forms the Crystal Reservoir and has the smallest capacity of the hydroelectric dams in the system, providing some 31,500 kilowatts capacity, or just over 1% of the Aspinall Unit's capacity.

=== Participating projects ===
A number of water management projects in various locations of the upper Colorado River basin are considered participating projects in the Colorado River Storage Project. These projects are financially related to the CRSP but are not considered a part of the project itself.

Eleven projects were included as participating projects in the 1956 legislation. These projects include:

- Central Utah Project, numerous dams and reservoirs in central Utah
- Emery County Project, covering dams in Emery County, Utah
- Florida Project, on the Florida River in southwestern Colorado
- Hammond Project, on the San Juan River in northeastern New Mexico
- La Barge Project in Wyoming
- Lyman Project, on the Blacks Fork and Smiths Fork of the Green River, primarily in Wyoming
- Paonia Project in west-central Colorado
- Pine River Project in western Colorado
- Seedskadee Project on the upper Green River Basin in Wyoming
- Silt Project in west-central Colorado
- Smith Fork Project in west-central Colorado

Wyoming's Eden Project was authorized independently in 1949. It was tied to the Colorado River Storage Project by the terms of its own authorization.

An amendment to the legislation in 1962 added two projects to the participants list:

- San Juan–Chama Project, diverting water from the San Juan River basin out to the Rio Grande basin
- Navajo Indian Irrigation Project, performed on behalf of the Bureau of Indian Affairs

A 1964 amendment added three more projects:

- Bostwick Park Project, involving Cimarron Creek, a tributary of the Gunnison River
- Fruitland Mesa Project in Colorado
- Savery-Pot Hook Project in Colorado and Wyoming

The Colorado River Basin Project Act in 1968 added a final five projects to the participants list:

- Animas-La Plata Water Project in Colorado and New Mexico
- Dallas Creek Project, a tributary of the Uncompahgre River, in turn a tributary of the Gunnison River
- Dolores Project in southwestern Colorado
- San Miguel Project, Colorado
- West Divide Project, Colorado

Four projects, the Fruitland Mesa, Savery-Pot Hook, San Miguel and West Divide Projects, were later found to be infeasible and removed from the list. Fruitland Mesa & Savery-Pot Hook Projects were cut by the United States Senate in the Public Works appropriations bill of July 1977.

== Project impact ==
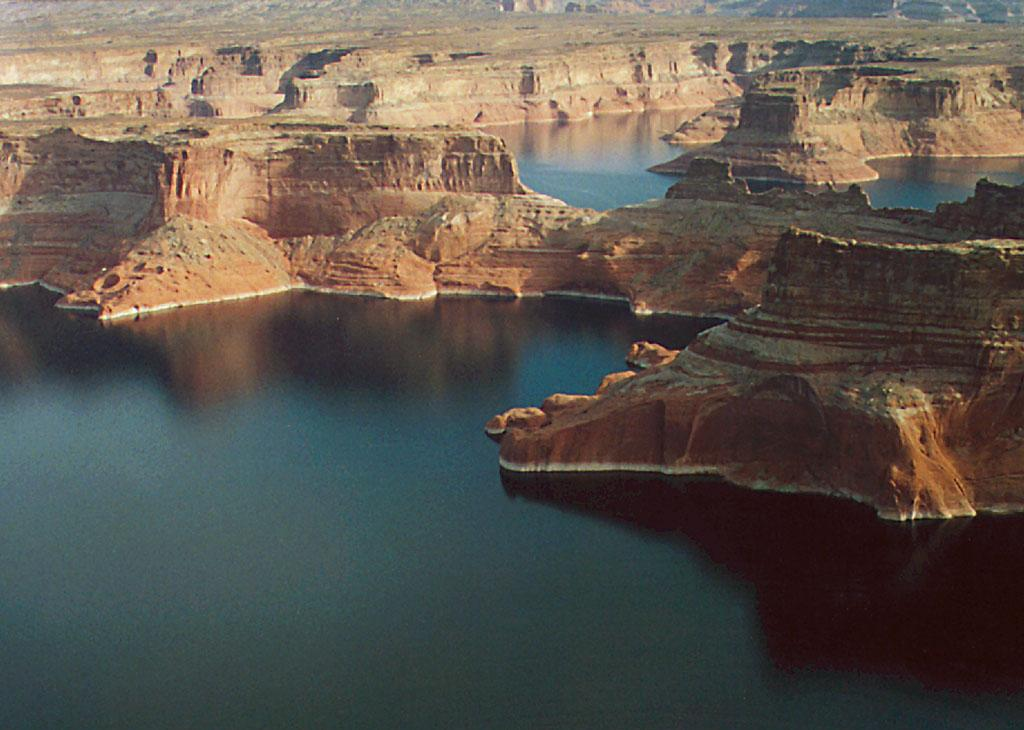
Lake Powell

=== Power, water, and recreational impact ===
The four primary units of the Colorado River Storage Project have a maximum output of 1,813 megawatts of hydroelectric power at any given time, comparable to a large coal-fired generating station such as the Navajo Generating Station.

The Blue Mesa and Navajo Dams, built primarily to function for flood control purposes, have saved approximately $10 million in flood-related costs up to the year 1999.

Additionally, the various units of the project have created significant recreational opportunities throughout the otherwise arid southwest regions.

=== Environmental impact ===
The project has changed the ecosystem in the Colorado River, including in Grand Canyon National Park. Glen Canyon Dam in particular has been the subject of much environmental criticism.

Water trapped behind the dams cools and drops its sediment load in the reservoirs. Natural floods of warm sediment-rich water flowing down the Colorado River, through the Grand Canyon, and on to the Colorado River Delta created sandbars and beaches along the river's course and throughout its canyons. These floods have been replaced with metered releases of cold, sediment-free water which has led to the erosion of sandbars in the Grand Canyon that are crucial for wildlife and has altered the food web within the river with natural species being displaced by invasive species. Attempts to simulate natural flood cycles were started in the 2000s but have thus far failed to restore the natural environment in the canyon.

The project has changed the topography of the river with the heavy loads of silt trapped behind the dams deposited in the upper reaches of the reservoirs. These silt loads have filled up the inundated canyons and are now coming to the surface as the water levels in the reservoirs drop.

The creation of large reservoirs and irrigation systems along the river as part of the project has increased the surface area of the Colorado River and the length of time the water is held in the basin which in turn increases the amount of water lost to evaporation. Some estimates indicate that 8.5 million acre feet of water is being lost each year, equivalent to the average amount of water released from Lake Powell to Lake Mead.

Water from the Colorado River rarely reaches the Colorado River Delta anymore due to usage and evaporative loss within the Project. This has reduced the size of the estuary at the mouth of the river from 3,000 square miles to fewer than 250 square miles. Invasive species have become dominant in the Delta and the loss of this habitat has had wider implications for marine life in the Gulf of California.
