= Morrow Point Reservoir =

Reservoir on the Gunnison River in Colorado

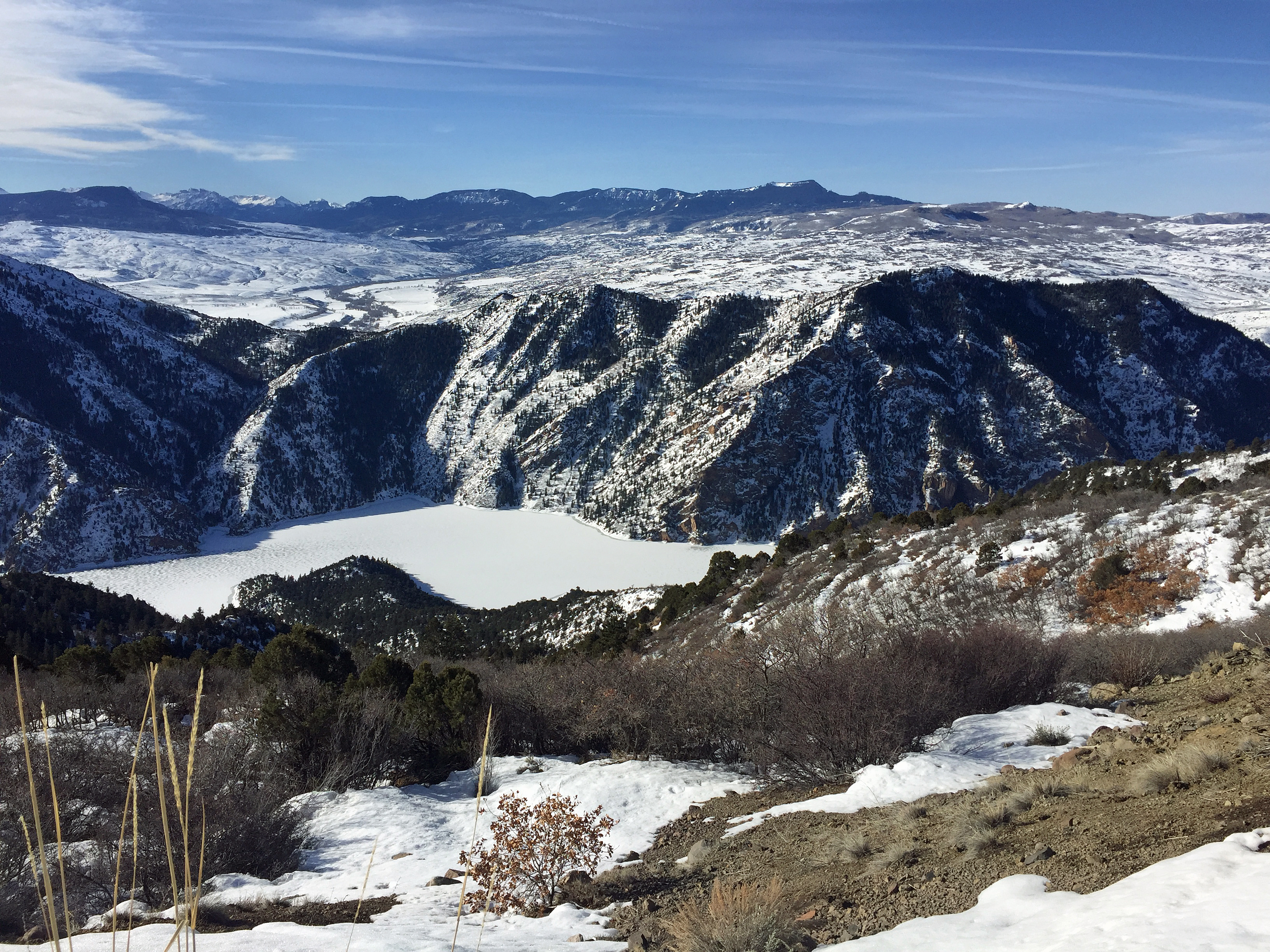
- The reservoir, frozen over in winter, as seen from Hermit's Rest

- Location within Colorado Location within the United States
- Location: Gunnison and Montrose Counties, Colorado
- Coordinates: 38°27′06″N 107°32′14″W
- Type: Hydroelectric Reservoir
- Part of: Wayne N. Aspinall Storage Unit (Bureau of Reclamation)
- Primary inflows: Gunnison River, Curecanti Creek, Blue Creek
- Managing agency: Curecanti National Recreation Area (National Park Service)
- First flooded: 1968; 58 years ago
- Max. length: 12 miles (19 km)
- Surface area: 817 acres (331 ha)
- Water volume: 117,190 acre-feet (144.55 GL)
- Surface elevation: 7,160 feet (2,180 m)
- Settlements: Gunnison, Colorado; Montrose, Colorado
- Website: https://www.nps.gov/cure/index.htm

Morrow Point Reservoir is an 817-acre (331 ha) artificial reservoir on the Gunnison River in western Colorado. Located in the upper Black Canyon of the Gunnison, the lake was created in 1968 by the U.S. Bureau of Reclamation as part of a larger plan to impound the upper section of the Gunnison and create opportunities for hydroelectric power generation, water conservation, and recreation. Morrow Point Reservoir is managed by the National Park Service as a unit within the Curecanti National Recreation Area, and is the location of the Curecanti Needle, a striking 700-foot (210 m) granite spire on the reservoir's southern bank whose unique shape was for decades a recognized symbol of the Denver and Rio Grande Western Railroad.

== Background ==
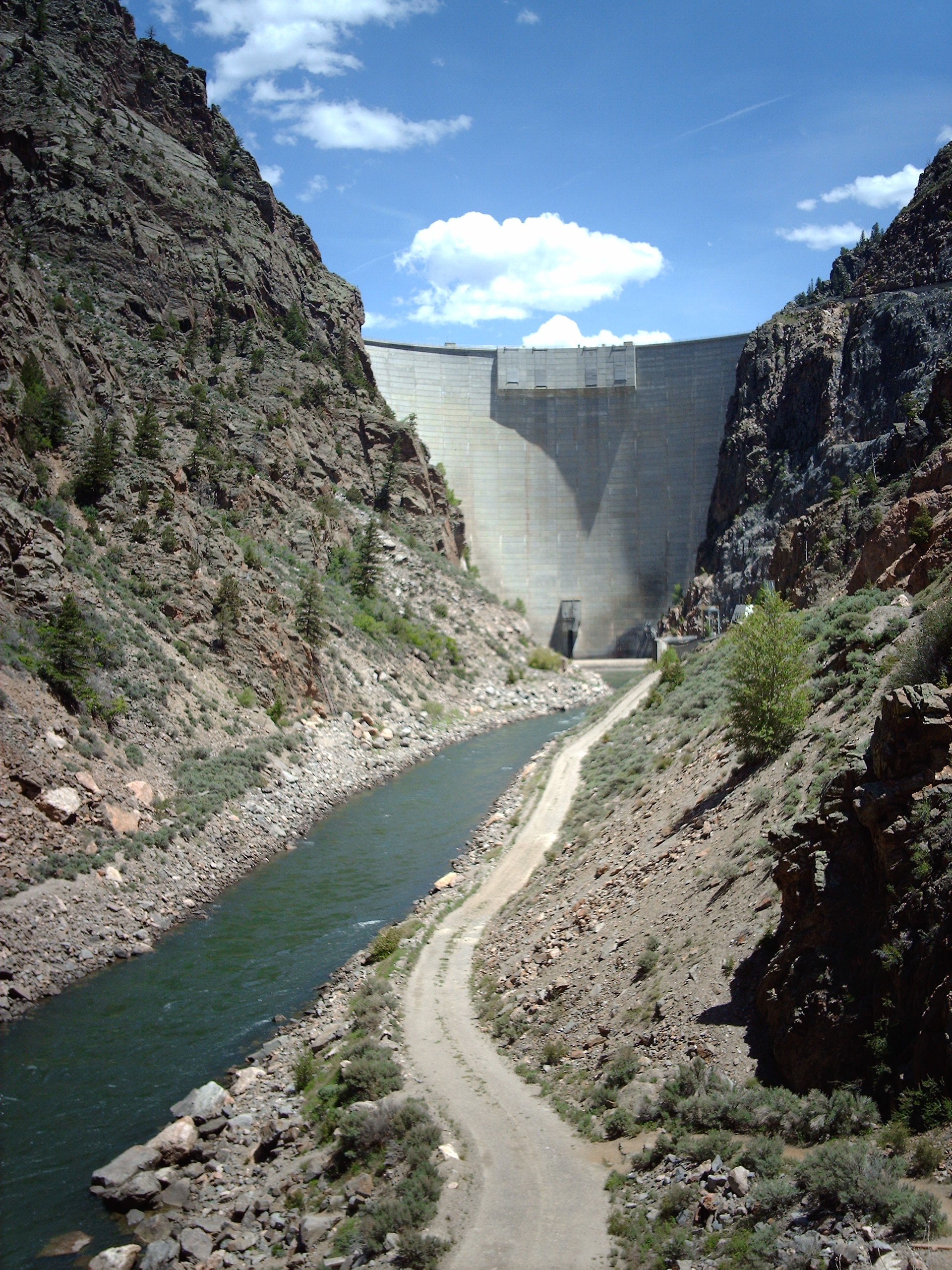
Morrow Point Dam

Morrow Point Reservoir is part of the Wayne N. Aspinall Unit of the Colorado River Storage Project, a Bureau of Reclamation project that retains the waters of the Colorado River and its tributaries, such as the Gunnison, for agricultural and municipal use. The second of three reservoirs impounded for the Aspinall Unit, Morrow Point lies between the larger Blue Mesa Reservoir to the east and the remote Crystal Reservoir, to the west. Morrow Point Reservoir was created by the impoundment of the Gunnison River approximately 12 miles (19 km) west of Blue Mesa Dam by Morrow Point Dam, a 486-foot (148 m) concrete double-arch dam built by the Bureau of Reclamation. Completed in 1968, Morrow Point was the first concrete double-arch dam constructed by the Bureau.

== The Needle ==
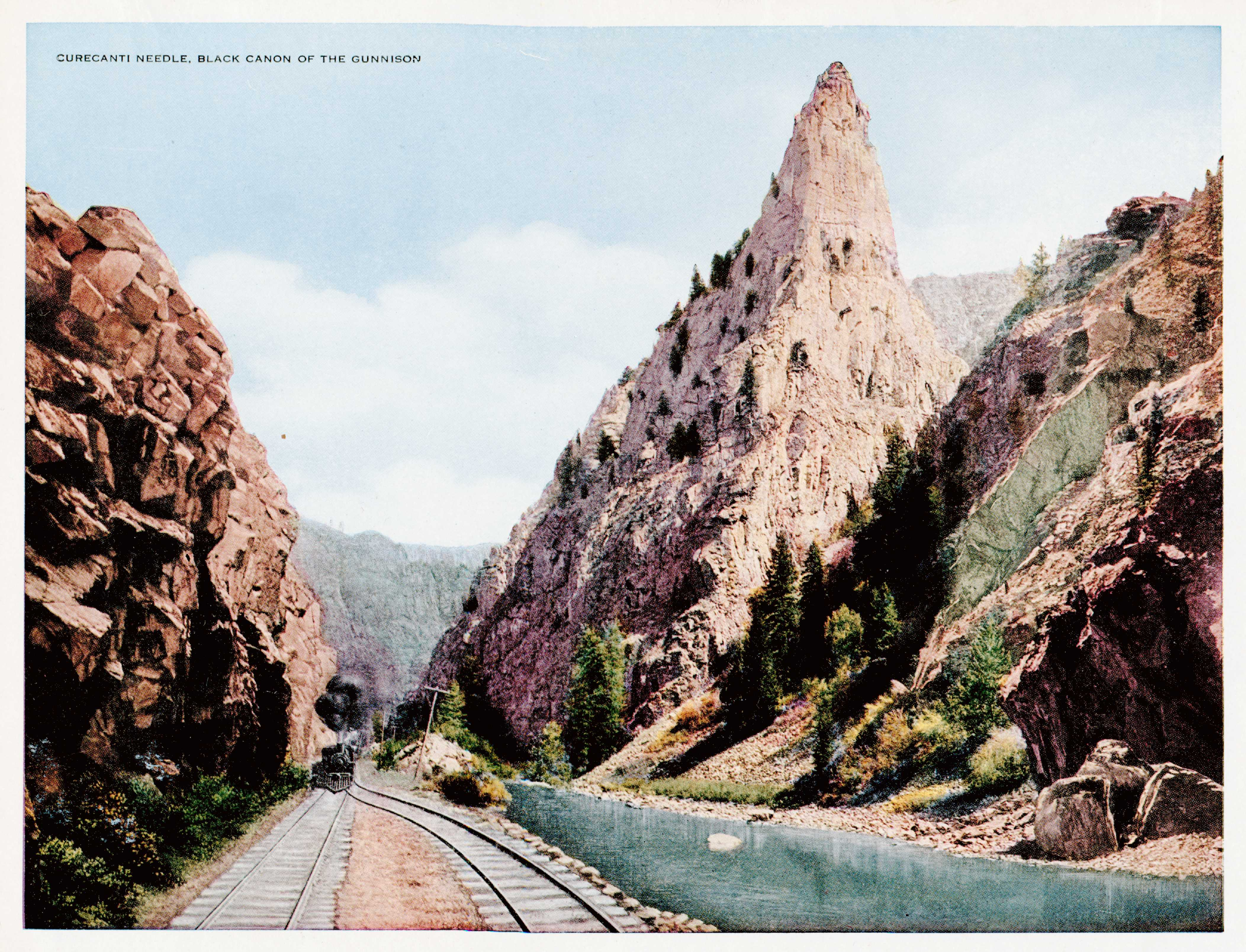
Curecanti Needle, Linen Postcard, 1910s

One of the most notable features of Morrow Point is the famed Curecanti Needle, a striking 700-foot (210 m) tall granite spire on the reservoir's southern shore. Located immediately west of the mouth of Blue Creek and directly across from the mouth of Curecanti Creek, the Needle was a well-known landmark to generations of rail travelers, who passed near to the spire on the Denver & Rio Grande Western's Black Canyon route between Gunnison and Montrose. Though difficult to access, the Needle is popular with climbers, who must either use a boat or cross the frozen lake in winter to reach the base.

== Recreation ==
Morrow Point Reservoir is part of the Curecanti National Recreation Area, a National Park Service administered area charged with developing and managing recreation facilities on the three reservoirs that compose the Aspinall Unit. Recreational opportunities at Morrow Point include boating (hand-carried craft only), camping, and hiking. There are three small developed areas with lake access, the Pine Creek Trailhead, accessible via U.S. 50 approximately 1 mile west of Blue Mesa Dam, the Pioneer Point Overlook, north of the reservoir on Colorado Highway 92, approximately 5.5 miles west of Blue Mesa Dam, and the Hermit's Rest Trailhead, on Co. 92 approximately 17 miles west of Blue Mesa Dam.

Pine Creek Trailhead's 232 steps lead 180 ft. down to the water, where hand-carried craft can be launched. Once on the water, there are two developed and two primitive boat-in campsites along the north shore, and two primitive sites on the south shore. The two-mile (round trip) Pine Creek Trail follows an abandoned narrow-gauge railroad bed. Boat-in camping requires a Backcountry Permit, available at the Pine Creek Trailhead.

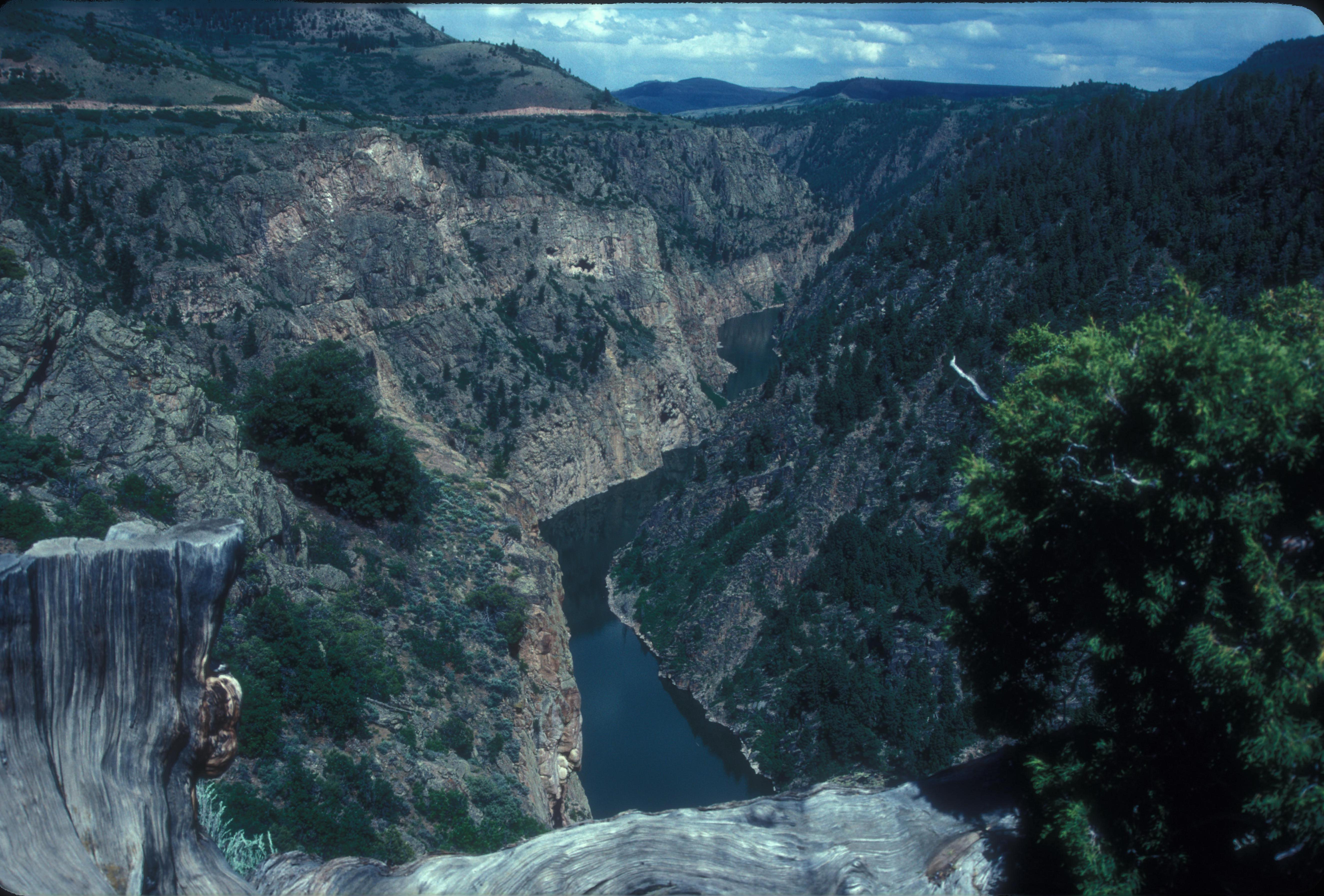
Pioneer Point Overlook, Morrow Point Reservoir

Pioneer Point Overlook offers a scenic viewing area and is the trailhead for the strenuous Curecanti Creek trail, a 4-mile (round trip) trail with a 900 ft. elevation change. Two campsites with picnic tables, fire grates, and composting toilets are located at the end of the trail.

Hermit's Rest Trailhead gives access to the steep and strenuous Hermit's Rest Trail. A 6-mile round trip with an 1800 ft. elevation change, the trail ends with lakeside picnic sites and two campsites with picnic tables, fire grates, and composting toilets.

== See also ==
- List of largest reservoirs of Colorado
- Colorado River Storage Project
- Curecanti National Recreation Area
- Morrow Point Dam
- Blue Mesa Reservoir
- Crystal Reservoir
