= Morrow Point Dam =

Dam on the Gunnison River in Colorado

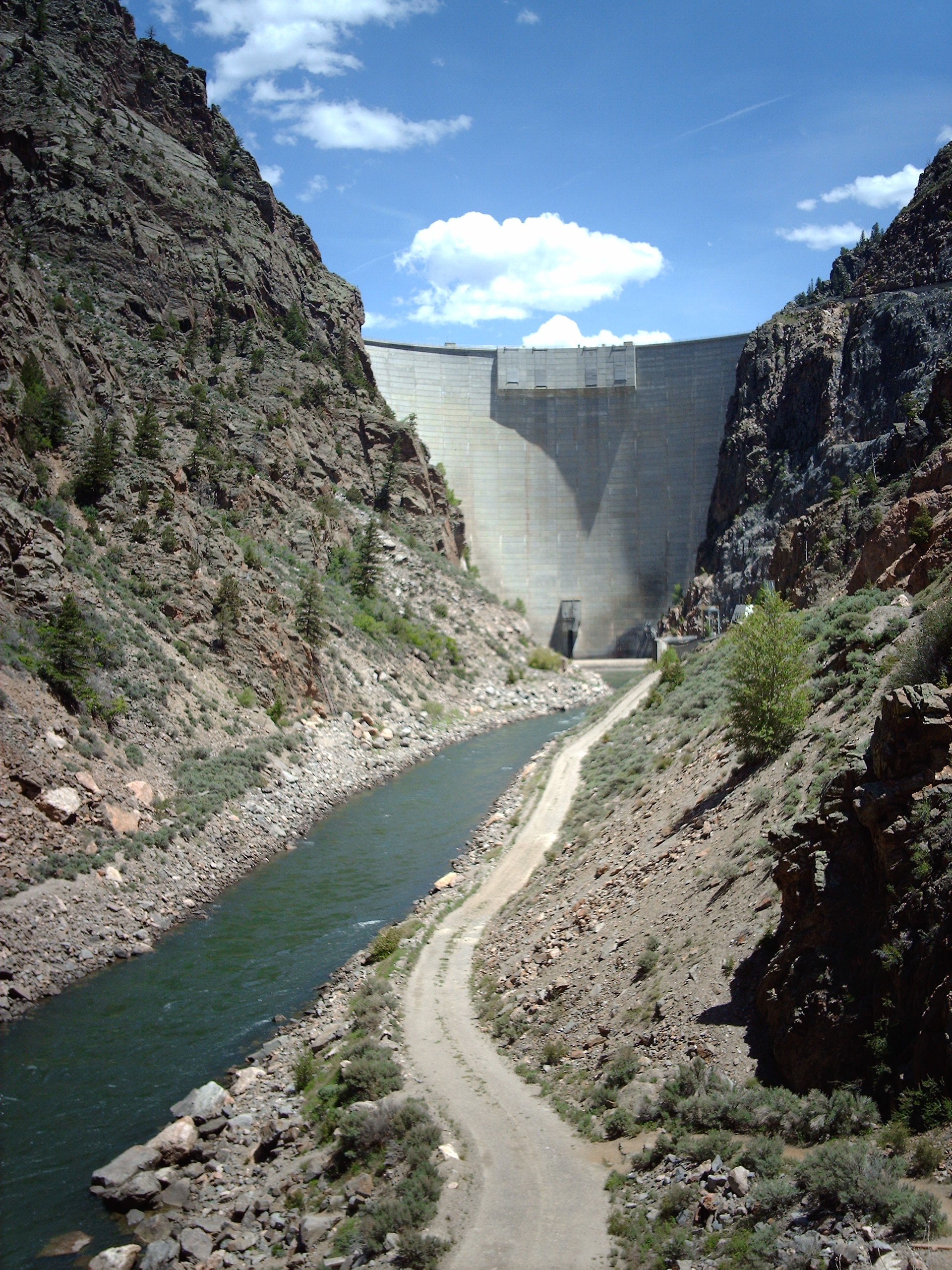
- Morrow Point Dam

- Location within Colorado
- Location: Cimarron, Gunnison County, Colorado, USA
- Coordinates: 38°27′07.25″N 107°32′17″W
- Construction began: 1963
- Opening date: 1968
- Operator: U.S. Bureau of Reclamation

Dam and spillways
- Type of dam: Concrete thin arch
- Impounds: Gunnison River
- Height: 468 feet (143 m)
- Length: 724 feet (221 m)
- Width (crest): 12 feet (3.7 m)
- Width (base): 52 feet (16 m)
- Dam volume: 365,180 cu yd (279,200 m^{3})
- Spillway type: Four-orifice free-fall in center of dam face, fixed-wheel gates
- Spillway capacity: 41,000 cu ft/s (1,200 m^{3}/s)

Reservoir
- Creates: Morrow Point Reservoir
- Total capacity: 117,190 acre-feet (0.14455 km^{3})
- Catchment area: 3,675 sq mi (9,520 km^{2})
- Surface area: 817 acres (331 ha)

Power Station
- Hydraulic head: 413 ft (126 m)
- Turbines: 2 x 86.667 MW turbines
- Installed capacity: 173.3 MW
- Annual generation: 269,193,371 kWh

Morrow Point Dam is a 468-foot-tall (143 m) concrete double-arch dam on the Gunnison River located in Colorado, the first dam of its type built by the U.S. Bureau of Reclamation. Located in the upper Black Canyon of the Gunnison, it creates Morrow Point Reservoir, and is within the National Park Service-operated Curecanti National Recreation Area. The dam is between the Blue Mesa Dam (upstream) and the Crystal Dam (downstream). Morrow Point Dam and reservoir are part of the Bureau of Reclamation's Wayne N. Aspinall Unit of the Colorado River Storage Project, which retains the waters of the Colorado River and its tributaries for agricultural and municipal use in the American Southwest. The dam's primary purpose is hydroelectric power generation.

== Description ==
The dam, powerplant and reservoir are contained in pre-Cambrian metamorphic rocks, primarily micaceous quartzite, quartz-mica, mica and biotite schists, with granitic veining. The dam site is in a narrow canyon about 200 feet (61 m) wide at the river and 550 feet (170 m) wide at the top. The spillway discharge falls 350 feet (110 m) into a stilling basin whose waters are retained by a weir below the dam. Intake structures near the south abutment feed two 18 feet (5.5 m) diameter penstock tunnels with 13.5 feet (4.1 m) steel linings leading to the powerplant. A streamflow of 100 cubic feet per second (2.8 m^{3}/s) is maintained at all times, equivalent to 200 acre-feet (0.00025 km^{3}) per day.

== History ==
The Curecanti Project (later renamed the Wayne N. Aspinall Project) was conceived in 1955, initially with four dams. It was approved by the Secretary of the Interior in 1959, comprising Blue Mesa Dam and Morrow Point Dam. Crystal Dam's design was unfinished and was approved in 1962. Plans for a fourth dam were dropped as uneconomical. The project was restricted to the stretch of the Gunnison above Black Canyon of the Gunnison National Monument (later designated a national park), a 40 miles (64 km) length of the river. Work began at the damsite in 1961 with foundation drilling. In 1962 the power plant exploratory tunnel was excavated. The construction contract for the dam was awarded to a joint venture between the Al Johnson Construction Company and Morrison-Knudsen, with notice to proceed given on June 13, 1963. Access roads and a diversion tunnel were begun that year, with the diversion tunnel complete by May 1964. Keyway excavation on either side of the dam continued through 1964. In 1965 work got underway on the powerplant, with several tunnels started. Concrete for the dam was first placed on September 3, 1965. The powerplant was excavated by April 1966. Final concrete placement on the dam took place on September 14, 1967. The diversion tunnel was closed on January 24, 1968, with releases through the outlet structures the next day. Final completion was achieved for the dam on October 7, 1968, while work continued on the powerplant. The plant was accepted and a visitor center was completed in 1971, with final completion on May 12, 1972.

The dam's grout curtain was extended in 1970 after leakage into the power plant reached 429 gallons per minute, using asphaltic emulsion and cement grout, reducing leakage to 37 gpm.

== Powerplant ==
Morrow Point Dam's powerplant is tunneled into the canyon wall 400 feet (120 m) below the surface at the dam's left abutment. It houses two 86.667 MW generators, uprated from 60 MW each in 1992-1993. The generating hall measures 231 feet (70 m) by 57 feet (17 m), with between 64 meters (210 ft) and 134 feet (41 m) of height. First operating in 1970, it is operated as a peaking plant. An exploratory tunnel became a ventilation tunnel, while initial access during construction was made through the cable tunnel, with two headings raising the head of the tunnel arch. An access tunnel intersects the generating hall at a right angle, with two draft tubes excavated below. In irrigation season the powerplant is operated as a base load plant, providing peaking power in other seasons.
