= Gunnison River =

Tributary of the Colorado River in Colorado, United States

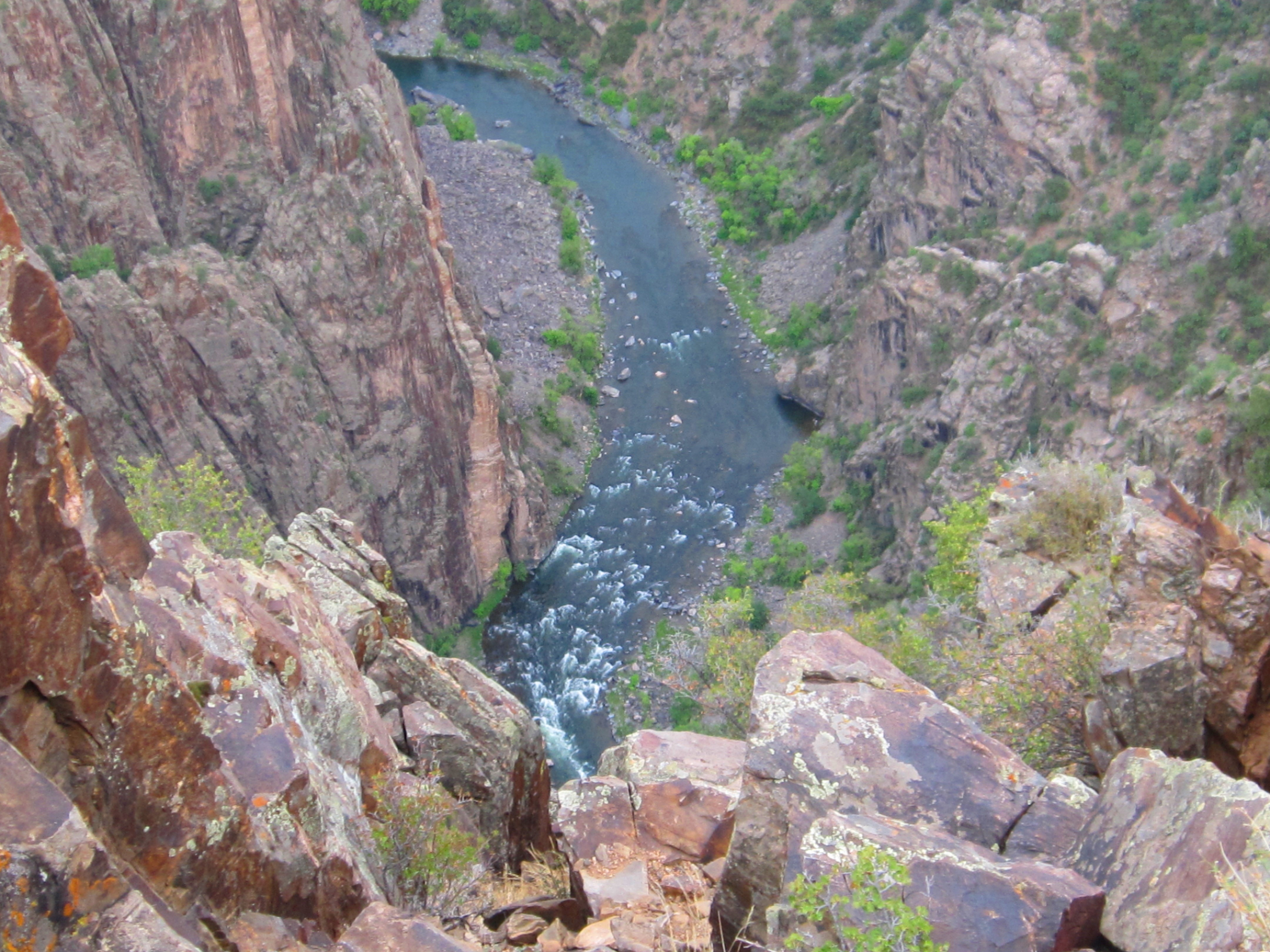
- The Gunnison River in Black Canyon of the Gunnison National Park

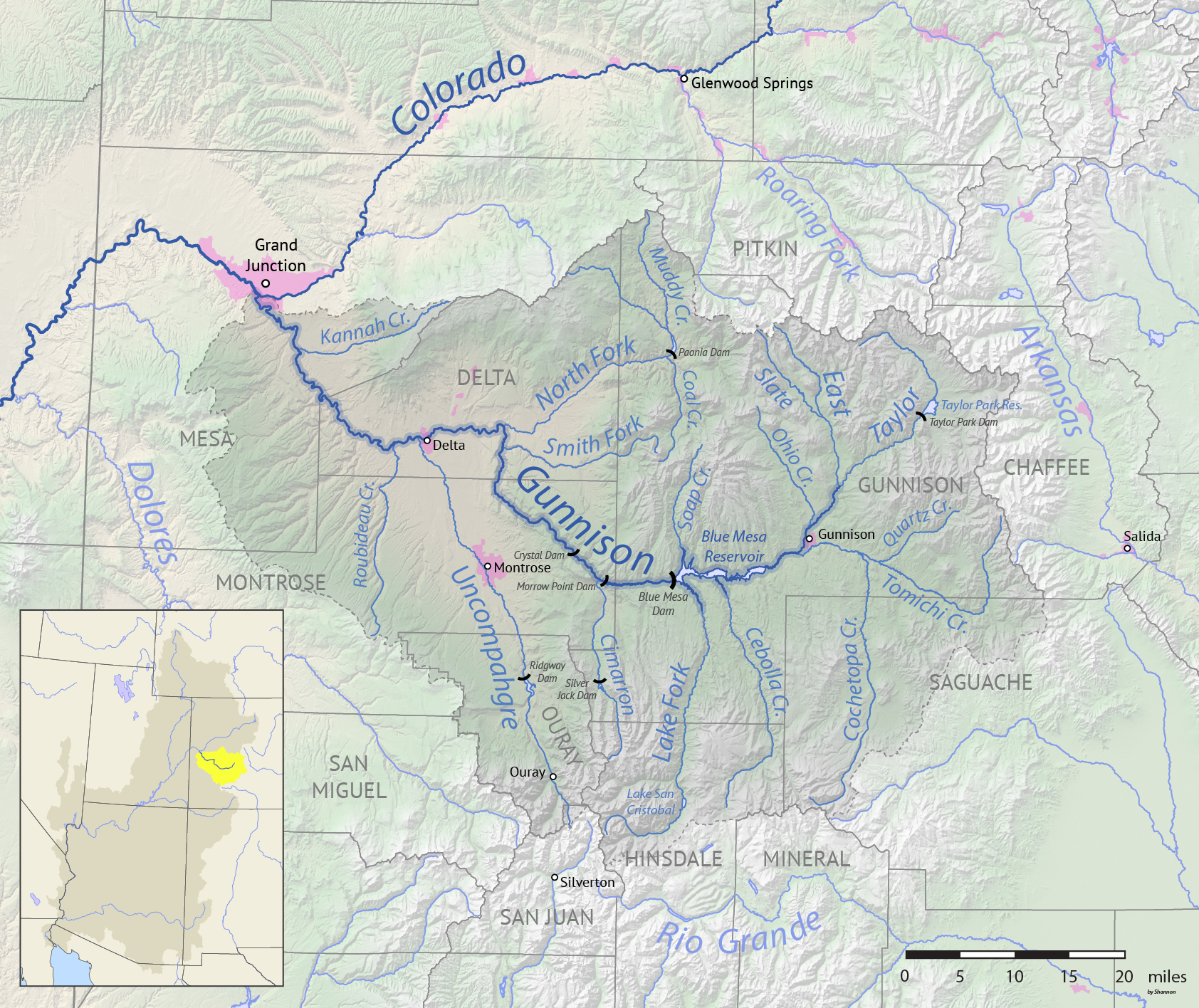
- Map of the Gunnison River, its tributaries and major cities

Location
- Country: United States
- State: Colorado
- Cities: Gunnison, Grand Junction

Physical characteristics
- Source: East River confluence with the Taylor River
  - coordinates: 38°39′49″N 106°50′50″W
  - elevation: 8,008 ft (2,441 m)
- Mouth: Colorado River
  - coordinates: 39°3′42″N 108°34′42″W
  - elevation: 4,552.56 ft (1,387.62 m)
- Length: 180 mi (290 km)
- Basin size: 7,923 sq mi (20,520 km^{2})
- Discharge
  - location: USGS Station 09152500 GUNNISON RIVER NEAR GRAND JUNCTION, CO
  - average: 2,499 cu ft/s (70.8 m^{3}/s)
  - minimum: 106 cu ft/s (3.0 m^{3}/s)
  - maximum: 35,700 cu ft/s (1,010 m^{3}/s)

Basin features
- Tributaries
  - left: Tomichi Creek, Cebolla Creek, Lake Fork Gunnison River, Cimarron River, Uncompahgre River
  - right: Smith Fork, North Fork Gunnison River, Kannah Creek

The Gunnison River is located in western Colorado, United States, and is one of the largest tributaries of the Colorado River.

== Description ==
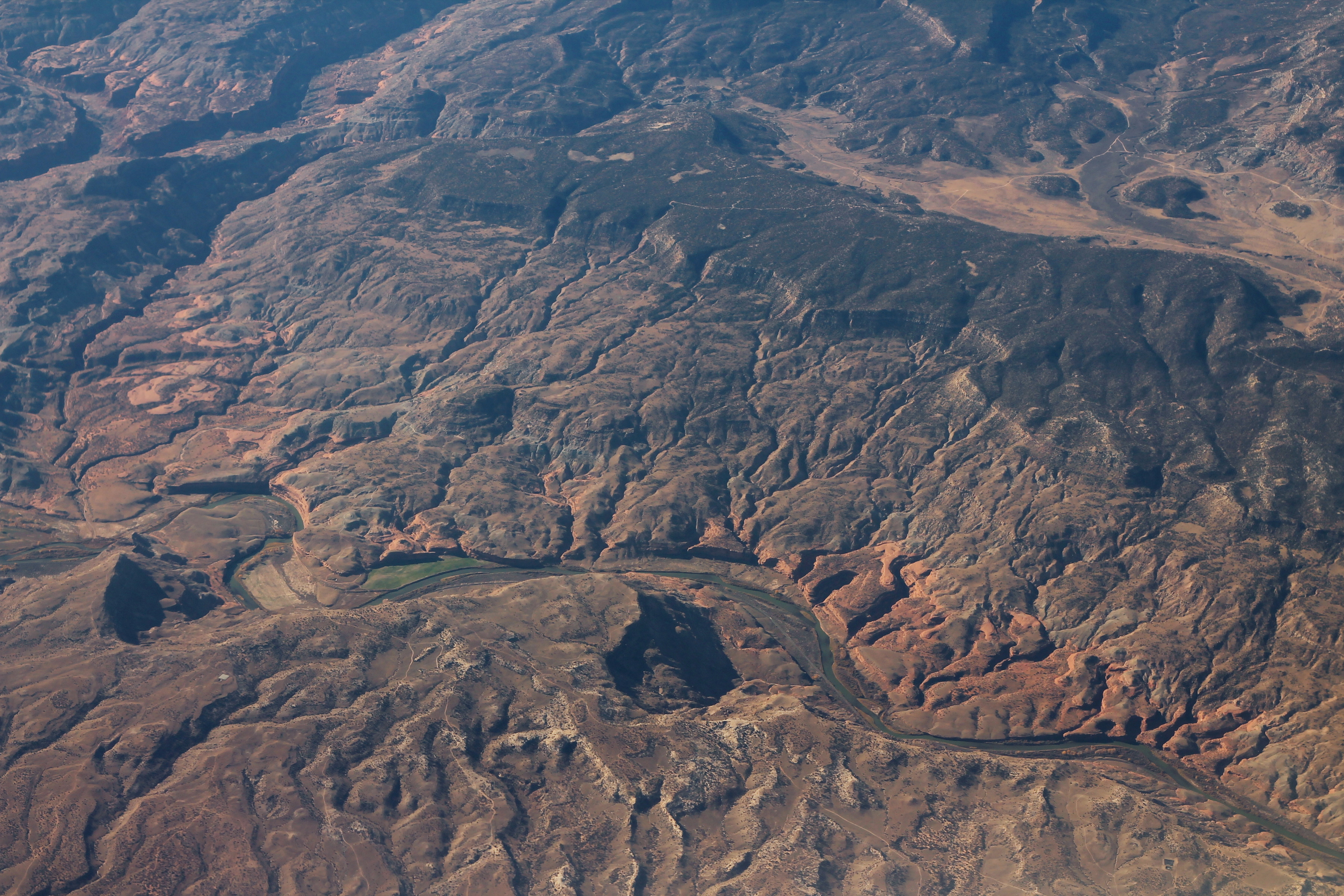
An aerial photograph of Gunnison River, November 2014

The 180-mile-long (290 km) river flows east to west and has a drainage area of 7,923 square miles (20,520 km^{2}) according to the USGS. The drainage basin of the Gunnison collects water from different habitats, such as forests and alpine meadows, located along the Continental Divide. As the river flows westward, it carves through the San Juan Mountains. It flows into the Colorado River at Grand Junction.

The Gunnison River Basin is popular for recreational activities such as fishing, rafting, boating, camping, hiking, and rock climbing.

Contamination of the Gunnison River with selenium and mercury results from irrigation of high-selenium soils derived from the Mancos Shale and from mineral mining. The region surrounding the Gunnison River is part of the Colorado Mineral Belt. Contamination of the Gunnison River with selenium and mercury is a conservation concern for the bonytail chub, Colorado pikeminnow, humpback chub, and razorback sucker, whose critical habitat includes the lower Gunnison River.

== Basin features ==
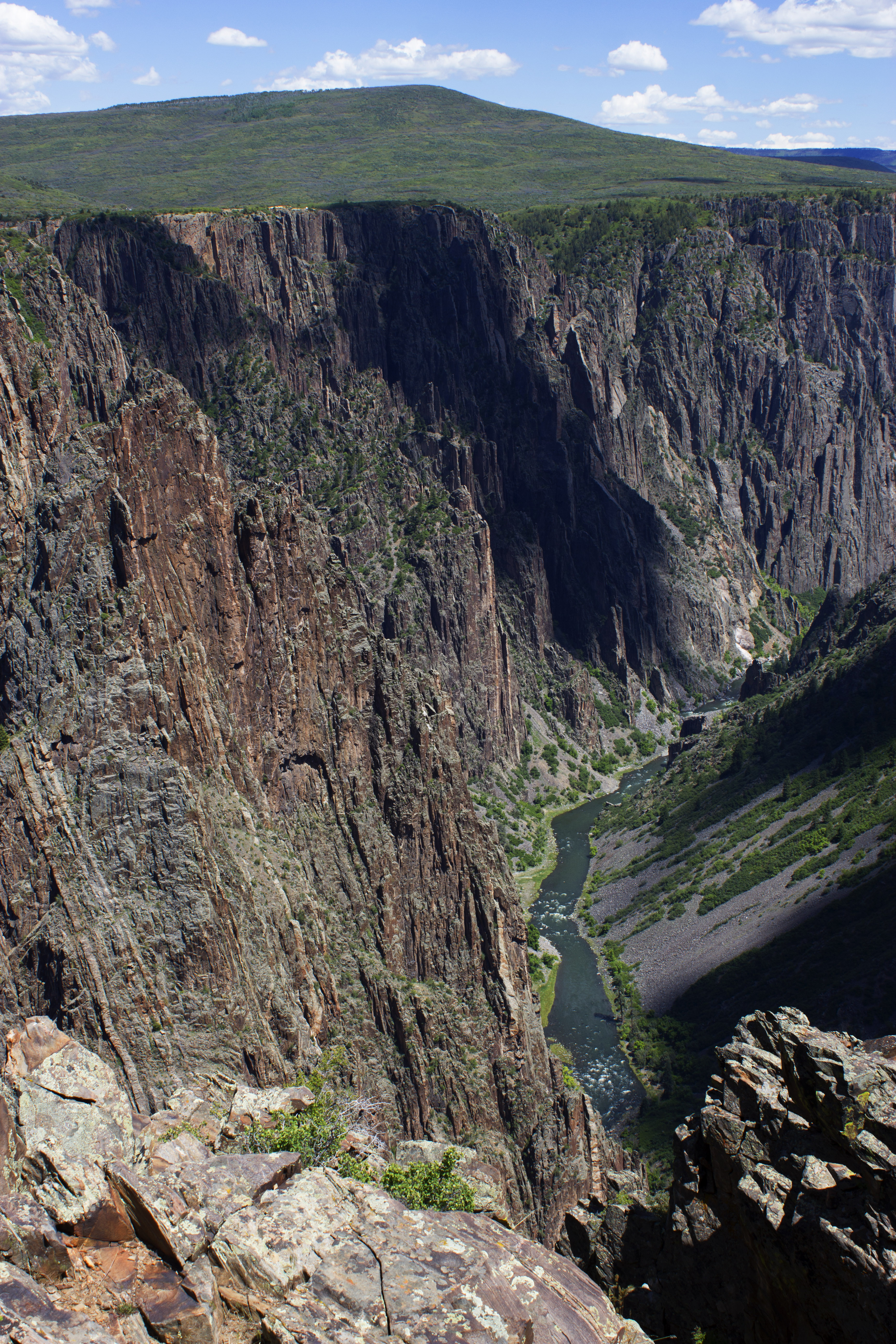
Black Canyon of the Gunnison, June 2016

The Gunnison River is formed by the confluence of the Taylor and East rivers at Almont in eastern Gunnison County, Colorado. Just past the town of Gunnison, the river begins to swell into the expanse of Blue Mesa Reservoir, a 36-mile-long (58 km) reservoir formed by Blue Mesa Dam, where it receives the Lake Fork of the Gunnison. Just downstream, it is dammed again to form Morrow Point Reservoir and then dammed again to form Crystal Reservoir. The reservoirs produce hydroelectric power and supply the surrounding areas with water for both municipal and irrigation use. The reservoirs are located along the upper part of the Gunnison River. Below Crystal Dam, the Gunnison River begins to roar through massive cataracts.

The Gunnison River then flows through the Black Canyon of the Gunnison, one of the longest, narrowest, and deepest gorges in the world. At the outlet of the Black Canyon, it receives the North Fork River, and then downstream, near Delta, it is joined by the Uncompahgre River. It then winds through desert canyonlands, where it receives Kannah Creek. It then empties out of the Dominguez Canyon into the Colorado River at Grand Junction, where some years it rivals the Colorado River in volume.

The Gunnison River ranges in width from 100 to 1,000 feet (30 to 305 m) and in depth from 3 to 50 feet (1 to 15 m). The river's powerful current and many rapids make upstream travel nearly impossible. It is navigable by small craft throughout its course and by larger boats below the Black Canyon. Parts of the Black Canyon are non-navigable by any sort of craft because of giant cataracts. Navigation through the entire canyon is dangerous and for experienced boaters only.

== History ==
The first non-native to see and record information of the Gunnison River was Juan Maria de Rivera, who came to the banks of the river just below its confluence with the Uncompahgre River in 1765. It was again seen in 1776 by Silvestre Vélez de Escalante. At the time the Spanish name for the river was Rio de San Javier (Xavier); the Native American name was Tomichi. Escalante noted that Rivera thought it was "the great Rio del Tizon", the long-used Spanish name for the lower Colorado River.

Through the mid-1800s, the river was variously named the Eagle, Eagle Tail, South Fork of the Grand, Grande, and Grand River. Exploration reports and published maps of the 1850s and 1860s most commonly referred to the river as the Grand River. In subsequent years, however, the river was renamed for U.S. Army Captain John W. Gunnison of the Topographic Engineers, who was ambushed and killed by Pahvant Utes while mapping a trail west in Utah Territory in 1853.

== Fishing ==
The lower section of the Gunnison River is designated as Gold Medal Water and Wild Trout Water. The fishing is very good and stretches for miles. The designated area begins 200 yards below the Crystal Dam and stretches through the Black Canyon to the confluence of the North Fork and Gunnison rivers.

== Engineering ==
Part of the river's water is diverted to irrigate the Uncompahgre Valley via the 5-mile-long (8 km) Gunnison Tunnel, which was built between 1905 and 1909. The Blue Mesa Dam, Morrow Point Dam, and Crystal Dam–built between the 1960s and the 1970s–are part of the Colorado River Storage Project.

== Timeline of river development and management projects ==
=== Past ===
Throughout the late 19th and early 20th century the Bureau of Reclamation built multiple dams (Blue Mesa, Morrow Point, and Crystal) and reservoirs (Blue Mesa, Morrow Point, and Crystal). All of these projects provided the area with large amounts of water which supported local agriculture, recreation, and other industries. Development of the Gunnison River prompted concerns from those wanting to preserve the scenic beauty of the river (especially the Black Canyon of the Gunnison). In the 1930s President Herbert Hoover designated the Black Canyon of the Gunnison River a national monument in order to protect "the roar of the river". By the end of the 20th century the Black Canyon received more protections when Congress declared the canyon a national park.

=== Present ===
In 2008, the Black Canyon Decree was passed which resolved legal disputes over water resources in Colorado and protect the Black Canyon of the Gunnison. The decree set a flow regime that "will protect the water-dependent resources of the Black Canyon and help restore the ecological balance in the river system disrupted by three federal dams immediately upstream of the Park." The condition of the Gunnison River continues to improve with increased protections for Black Canyon National Park and as stakeholders, scientists, and natural resource managers continue their efforts to protect the Gunnison. Their efforts include conducting scientific research and publishing information that informs the general public how they can protect the river. According to a progress report from 2019, the Gunnison Basin Selenium Management Program continues its efforts to "develop and implement a Selenium Management Program (SMP) in cooperation with the State of Colorado and Gunnison River basin water users to reduce adverse effects of selenium on endangered fish species in the Gunnison and Colorado rivers."

=== Future ===
The Gunnison River is threatened by climate change, demand for water resources, and ongoing challenges regarding selenium contamination. Because of these factors the future of the Gunnison River is uncertain.

== Ecosystem contamination ==
Selenium and mercury contamination of the Gunnison River results from irrigation of soils that are naturally high in selenium, mining activity, and atmospheric mercury deposition. Selenium and mercury contribute to concerns about conservation of resident biota. Four fish species - the humpback chub, bonytail chub, Colorado pikeminnow, and the razorback sucker - are endemic to the region. Critical habitat for these species includes the lower Gunnison River. Elevated salinity concentrations are also a problem for the river and its users. Soils derived from the Mancos Shale, east of the Uncompahgre River, are naturally high in both selenium and salinity.

=== Selenium ===
Elevated selenium in the Gunnison River Basin reflects the underlying geology. The Gunnison River Basin sits atop the Mancos Shale which is naturally elevated in selenium. The seleniferous soil the shale produces have come to the subsurface due to weathering of the rock and uplift. Agricultural irrigation of seleniferous soils is one mechanism of selenium loading to the Gunnison River. As farmland in the Gunnison River Basin is abundant, the amount of selenium reaches well over the normal concentration in areas from Grand Junction to the tributaries in the upper Gunnison River. Some of the most concentrated tributaries of the Gunnison, namely the Uncompahgre, load large amounts of selenium to the Gunnison River. Selenium concentrations in the River can be as high as 11 ppm during peak times. Agricultural areas in the Gunnison River Basin are heavily farmed and provide large amounts of sediment during the growing months. Concentrations of selenium in the Gunnison River rise in April until they peak in August due to irrigation drainage. These peaks in selenium concentrations coincide with the reproduction events of the Colorado pikeminnow and the razorback sucker. High amounts of selenium are deposited into the yolk by the mother and juvenile fish eat algae that is highly concentrated with selenium in August. Effects of high selenium concentrations in fish include reduced oxygenation rates and lowered total energy capacity used for movement and reproduction, with fitness consequences for migratory fish such as the Colorado pikeminnow. Elevated selenium exposure can also cause malformations in adult fish.

=== Mercury ===
Mercury in the Gunnison River comes from human activities including surface mining and burning fossil fuels such as coal. As rain water is discharged, it transports mercury to the river where bacteria biotransform mercury into methylmercury. Methylmercury has no biological benefit but rather bioaccumulates and biomagnifies through the trophic levels of the Gunnison River ecosystem. These concentrations of mercury can be as high as 13% above thresholds set in place by the EPA. Humpback chub, bonytail chub, Colorado pikeminnow, and the razorback sucker are susceptible to elevated concentrations of mercury based on their long distance annual migrations to reproduce. The Colorado pikeminnow is especially vulnerable to high concentrations of mercury as its life cycle is relatively long and the distances they travel for migration are especially far.

== Remediation ==
Organizations throughout Colorado are collaborating on pollution remediation in the Gunnison River in order to increase habitat quality for the razorback sucker and the Colorado pikeminnow. Some of these organizations and plans include The Gunnison River Basin's Selenium Management Plan, The Selenium Control Program, and the Bureau of Reclamation's Gunnison Basin Selenium Management Program. These programs aim to minimize the impact of selenium and salinity as unhealthy amounts of salinity lead to lower reproduction rates of fish as well as problems with agriculture. Current remediation attempts have led to a 43% reduction of selenium concentrations since the 1980s but additional reductions are needed to ensure the safety of the ecosystem. These attempts include giving funding to farmers of the Gunnison River Basin to reduce the amount of sedimentation deposited back into the river and therefore lower the overall amount of selenium being loaded into the river via tributaries. Salinity is being addressed by implementing local investments into the water use infrastructure by converting old systems to direct pipeline and sprinklers to help reduce the amount of runoff into the Gunnison. By reducing the amount of runoff being directed into the Gunnison, less selenium has been deposited into the river by irrigation drainage. As climate change reduces stream flow in the Gunnison River, future concentrations of both selenium and mercury will continually rise. This has led water managers and stakeholders from the Gunnison River Basin to review options in order to reduce the impact of climate change. These plans for the future hope to strengthen the critical water infrastructure, reduce agriculture water shortages, and encourage the beneficial relationship between agricultural, environmental and recreational water uses. In addition, the Clean Water State Revolving Fund has awarded the Colorado Department of Public Health and Environment almost $13 million for future research and development along with pollution control and mitigation attempts. Most recently, the Gunnison River will soon be evaluated by state water quality officials to determine if the improvement programs have been successful in reducing the selenium and salinity levels toxic to the endangered fish. If the selenium levels are above the 4.6 mg/L water quality standard, the Gunnison will be subject to reclassification.

== See also ==
- List of rivers of Colorado
- List of tributaries of the Colorado River
- Water pollution in the United States
- Kesterson National Wildlife Refuge
- Climate change
- Water scarcity
