= Iola, Colorado =

Extinct human settlement in America

Coordinates: 38.4750°N 107.0972°W

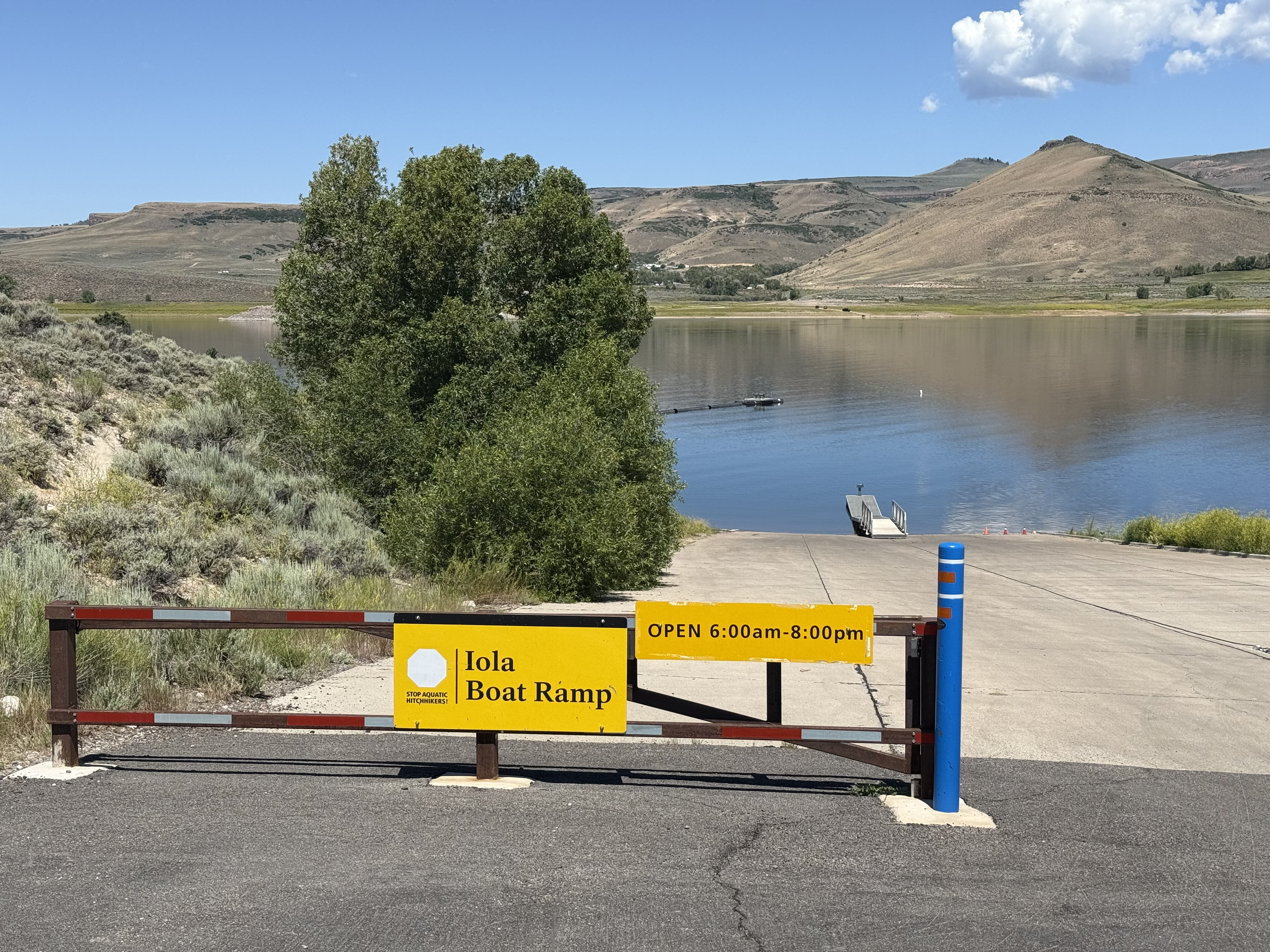
The dock floating above Iola, Colorado

Iola is an extinct town located in Gunnison County, Colorado, United States. The community was inundated and destroyed by the creation of Blue Mesa Reservoir.

== History ==
When the Denver and Rio Grande railroad pushed west from Gunnison in 1881, a stop was established at Stevens Ranch; a post office was established there from 1882 to 1896, when it moved east to Iola. A school district was organized in 1882 and served students through 1955. The Iola post office operated from June 24, 1896, until August 16, 1963. The name Iola reportedly was selected simply on account of it being a pleasant name.

The town's population peaked between 200 and 300 residents and had a store, hotel, and lookout tower. In addition to ranching, the area was a destination for fly fishing on the Gunnison River, with several resorts that catered to the activity.

In the late 1930s, Colorado State Highway 149 was routed through Iola with the road crossing the Gunnison River before its northern terminus at US 50.

The creation of Blue Mesa Reservoir in the 1960s inundated the town of Iola, along with the nearby towns of Cebolla and Sapinero.

In 2018, drought caused parts of Iola to be revealed by dropping water levels in the reservoir. An estimated 10-15 building foundations were visible by December 2018.

== Iola in popular culture ==
- The novel Go as a River (2023) by Shelley Read is set in a lightly fictionalized version of Iola.

== See also ==
- Bibliography of Colorado
- Geography of Colorado
- History of Colorado
- Index of Colorado-related articles
- List of Colorado-related lists
  - List of ghost towns in Colorado
  - List of post offices in Colorado
- Outline of Colorado
