= Middle Bridge (Colorado) =

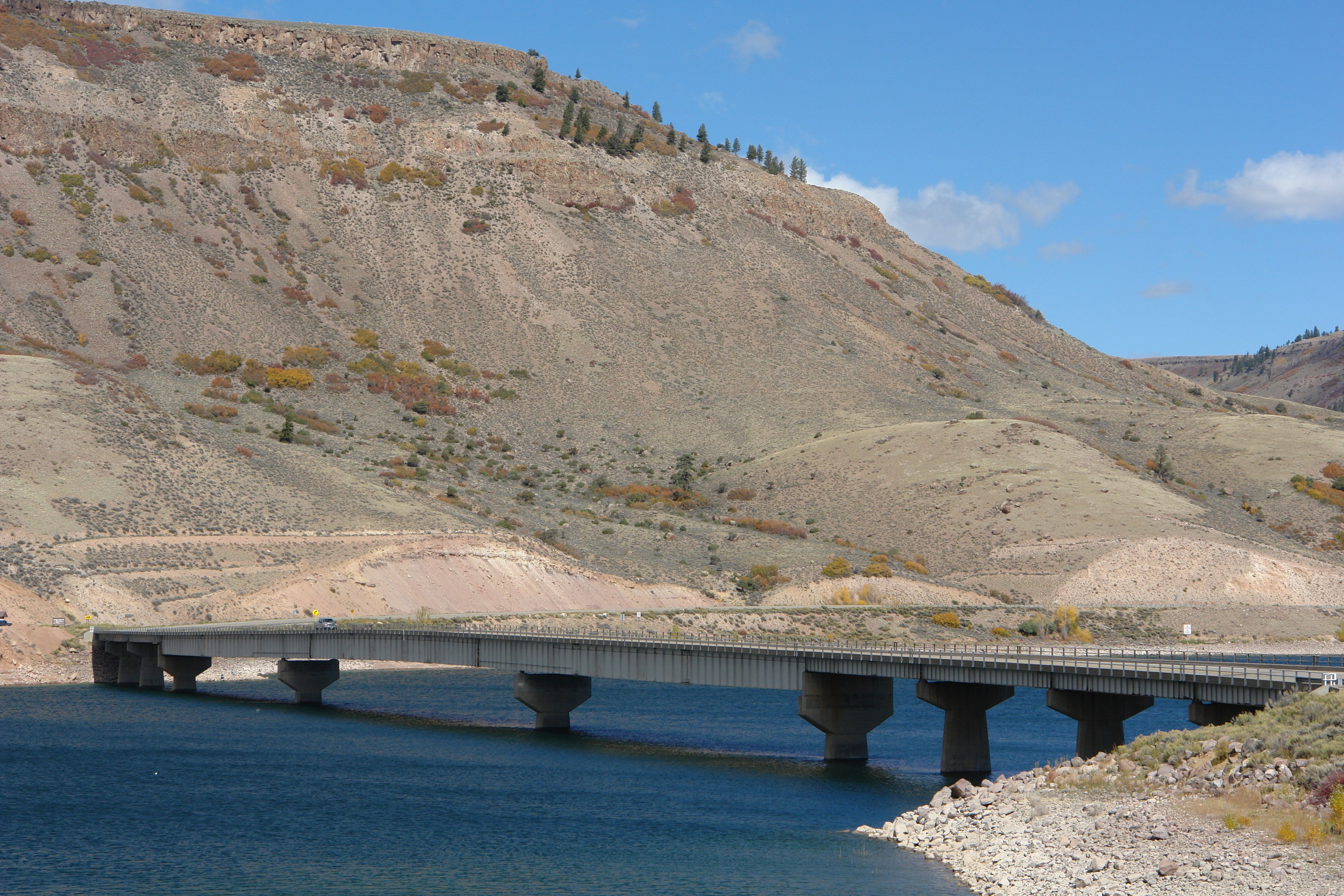
- Middle Bridge, October 2007
- Coordinates: 38.4680°N 107.2536°W
- Carries: US 50
- Crosses: Blue Mesa Reservoir/Gunnison River
- Locale: Gunnison County, Colorado; United States

Characteristics
- Design: Girder
- Material: Steel/Concrete

Location
- Interactive map of Middle Bridge

Middle Bridge is the crossing of Blue Mesa Reservoir (the Gunnison River) on U.S. Route 50 (US 50) within the Curecanti National Recreation Area in southwest Gunnison County, Colorado, United States, about 2.5 miles (4.0 km) east-northeast of the community of Sapinero.

Prior to the construction of the Blue Mesa Dam, US 50 did not cross the Gunnison River there, and a portion of the old highway can be seen descending into the lake. The Blue Mesa Middle Bridge was built in 1963.

== 2024 closure ==
The bridge was urgently closed on April 18, 2024, after an inspection found at least one 4 inch crack in the T-1 steel. Its 65 miles from Gunnison to Montrose. Detours were over 300 miles taking over 7 hours. Cracks and critical issues in four areas of the bridge were identified that posed an imminent risk to its structural integrity.

One lane of the bridge was reopened for travel on October 16, 2024. Vehicles were being piloted one direction at a time. On December 6, 2025 two-way traffic was reopened.

Final painting of the repairs was scheduled for May 2025.
