= Single-leaf =

Single-leaf may refer to:

- Single-leaf ash, a deciduous tree
- Single Leaf Bat, a mammal
- Single leaf bridge, a movable truss bridge with an elevated counterweight
- Single-leaf door, a door which consists of a single rigid panel that fills a doorway
- Single-leaf Pinyon, an evergreen tree
- Single-leaf woodcut, an individual woodcut print
