= Middle Bridge =

Middle Bridge may refer to:

- Middle Bridge, Basel, a historic bridge across the Rhine in the Swiss city of Basel
- Middle Bridge, Colorado, a bridge across the Blue Mesa Reservoir in the US state of Colorado
- Middle Bridge, Somerset, a location in the United Kingdom in North Somerset

See also

- Middle Arm Bridge, a transit bridge in Vancouver, Canada
