= Blue Mesa Dam =

Dam in Colorado, United States

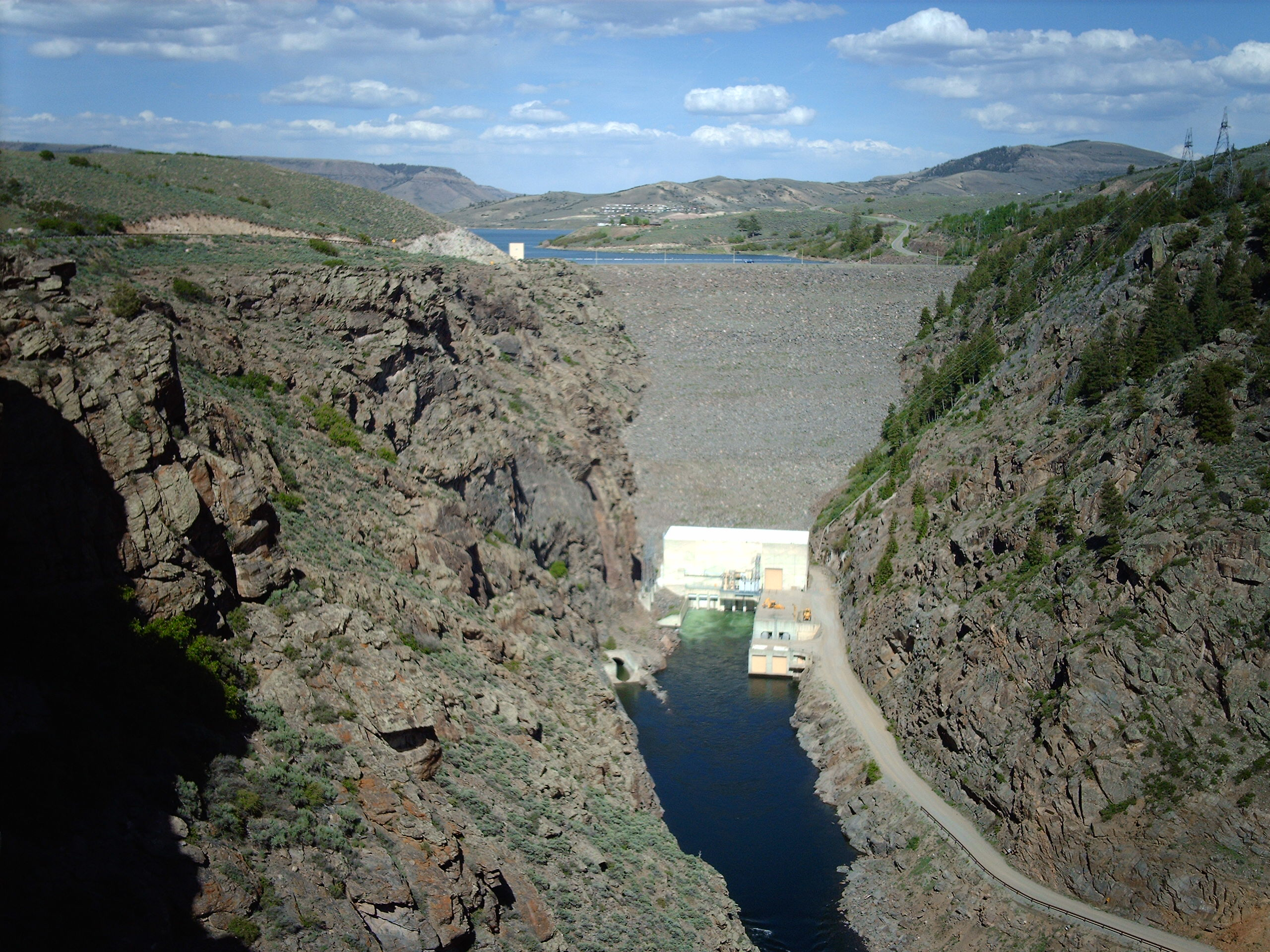
- Blue Mesa Dam

- Location within Colorado
- Interactive map of Blue Mesa Dam
- Location: Cimarron, Gunnison County, Colorado, USA
- Coordinates: 38°27′12″N 107°20′04″W
- Construction began: 1962
- Opening date: 1966
- Operator: U.S. Bureau of Reclamation

Dam and spillways
- Type of dam: Zoned earthfill
- Impounds: Gunnison River
- Height: 390 feet (120 m)
- Length: 785 feet (239 m)
- Dam volume: 3,080,000 cu yd (2,350,000 m^{3})
- Spillway type: Two radial gates feeding concrete-lined tunnels to a flip bucket and stilling basin
- Spillway capacity: 34,000 cu ft/s (960 m^{3}/s)

Reservoir
- Creates: Blue Mesa Reservoir
- Total capacity: 940,700 acre-feet (1.1603 km^{3})
- Catchment area: 3,470 sq mi (9,000 km^{2})
- Surface area: 9,180 acres (3,720 ha)

Power Station
- Hydraulic head: 332 ft (101 m)
- Turbines: 2 x 43.2 MW Francis turbines
- Installed capacity: 86.4 MW
- Annual generation: 203,411,938 kWh

Blue Mesa Dam is a 390-foot-tall (120 m) zoned earthfill dam on the Gunnison River in Colorado. It creates Blue Mesa Reservoir, and is within Curecanti National Recreation Area just before the river enters the Black Canyon of the Gunnison. The dam is upstream of the Morrow Point Dam. Blue Mesa Dam and reservoir are part of the Bureau of Reclamation's Wayne N. Aspinall Unit of the Colorado River Storage Project, which retains the waters of the Colorado River and its tributaries for agricultural and municipal use in the American Southwest. Although the dam does produce hydroelectric power, its primary purpose is water storage. State Highway 92 passes over the top of the dam. Blue Mesa Dam houses two turbine generators and produces an average of 264,329,000 kilowatt-hours each year.

== Description ==
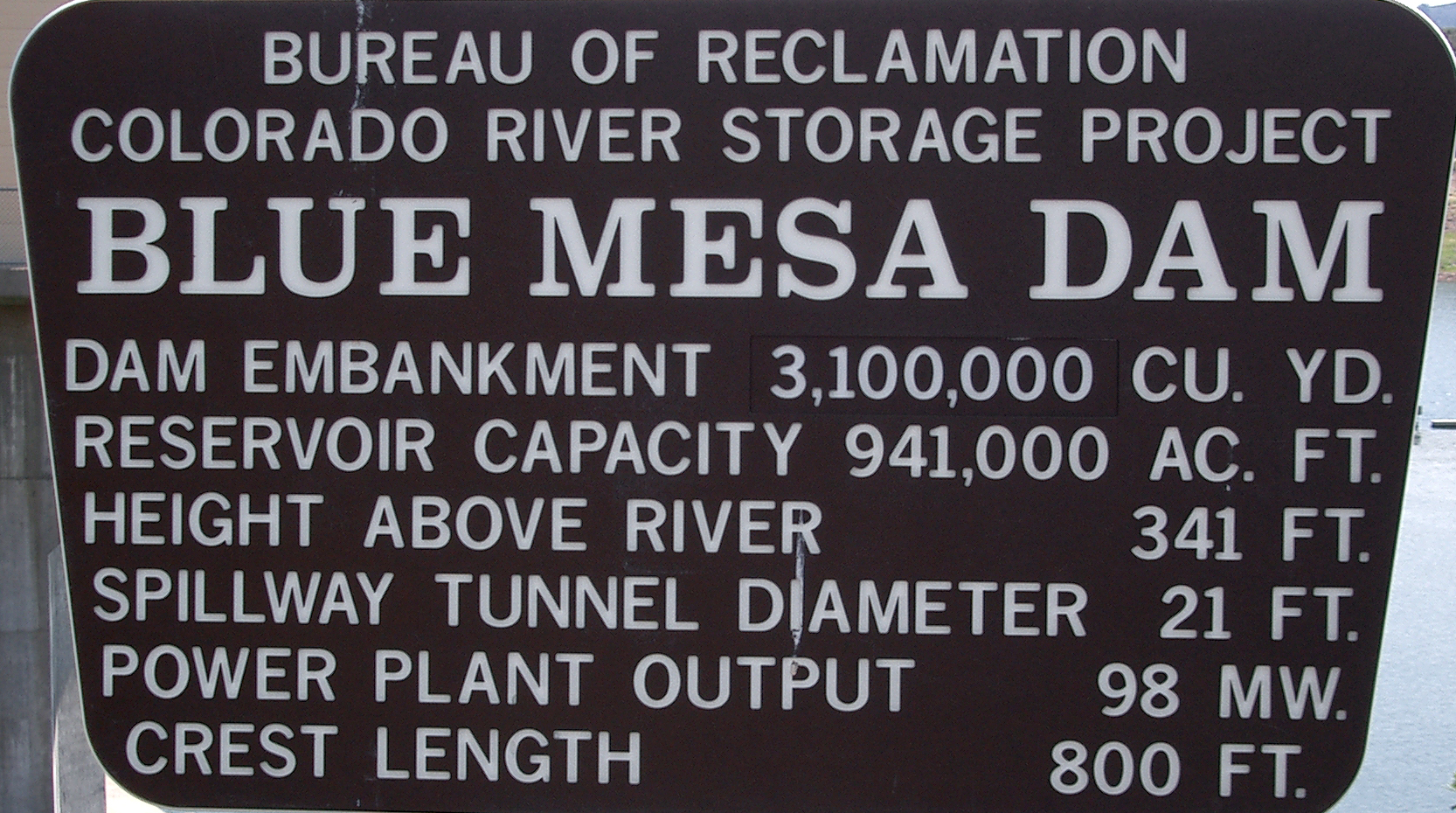
Blue Mesa Dam

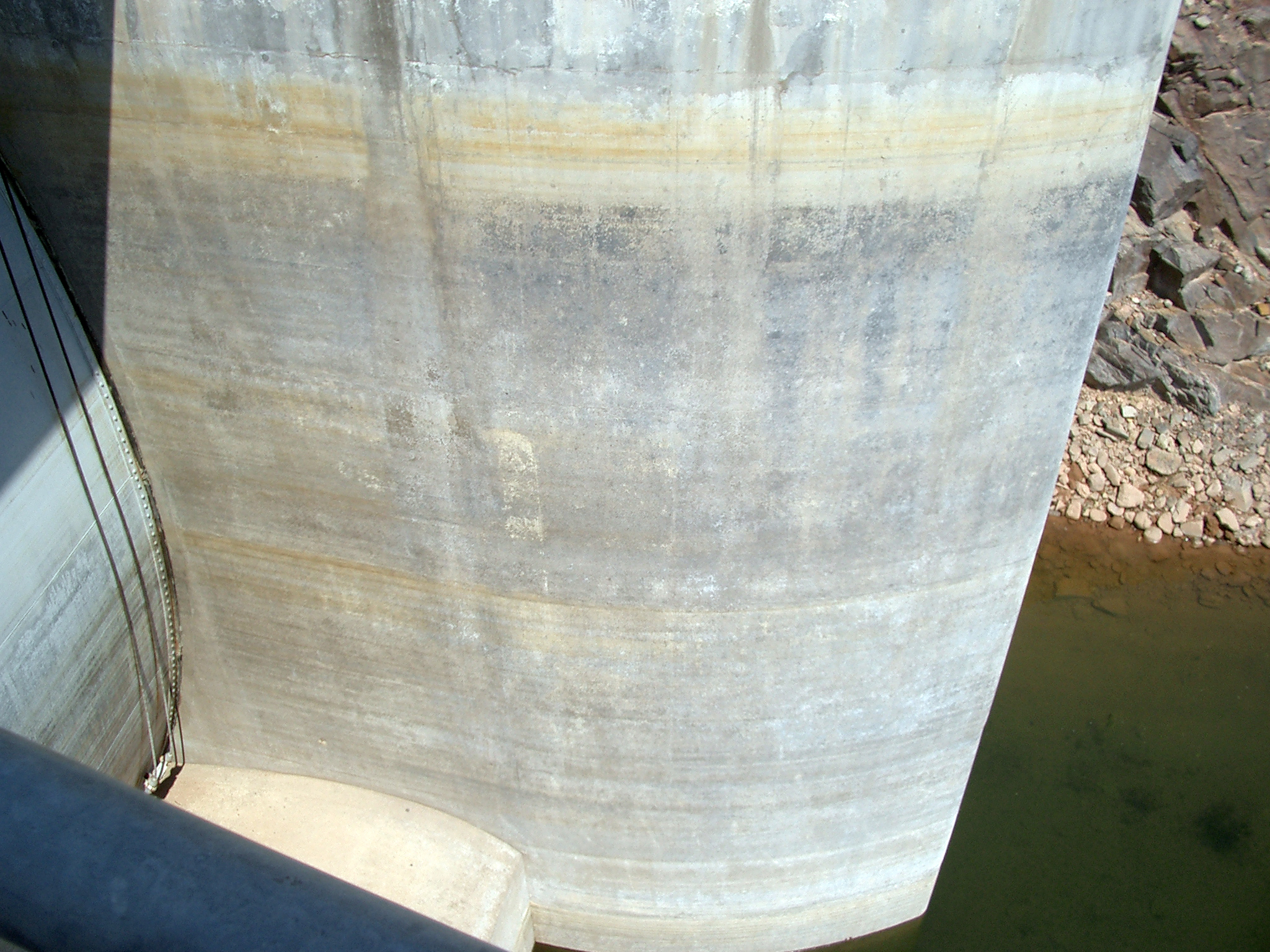
Very low water levels

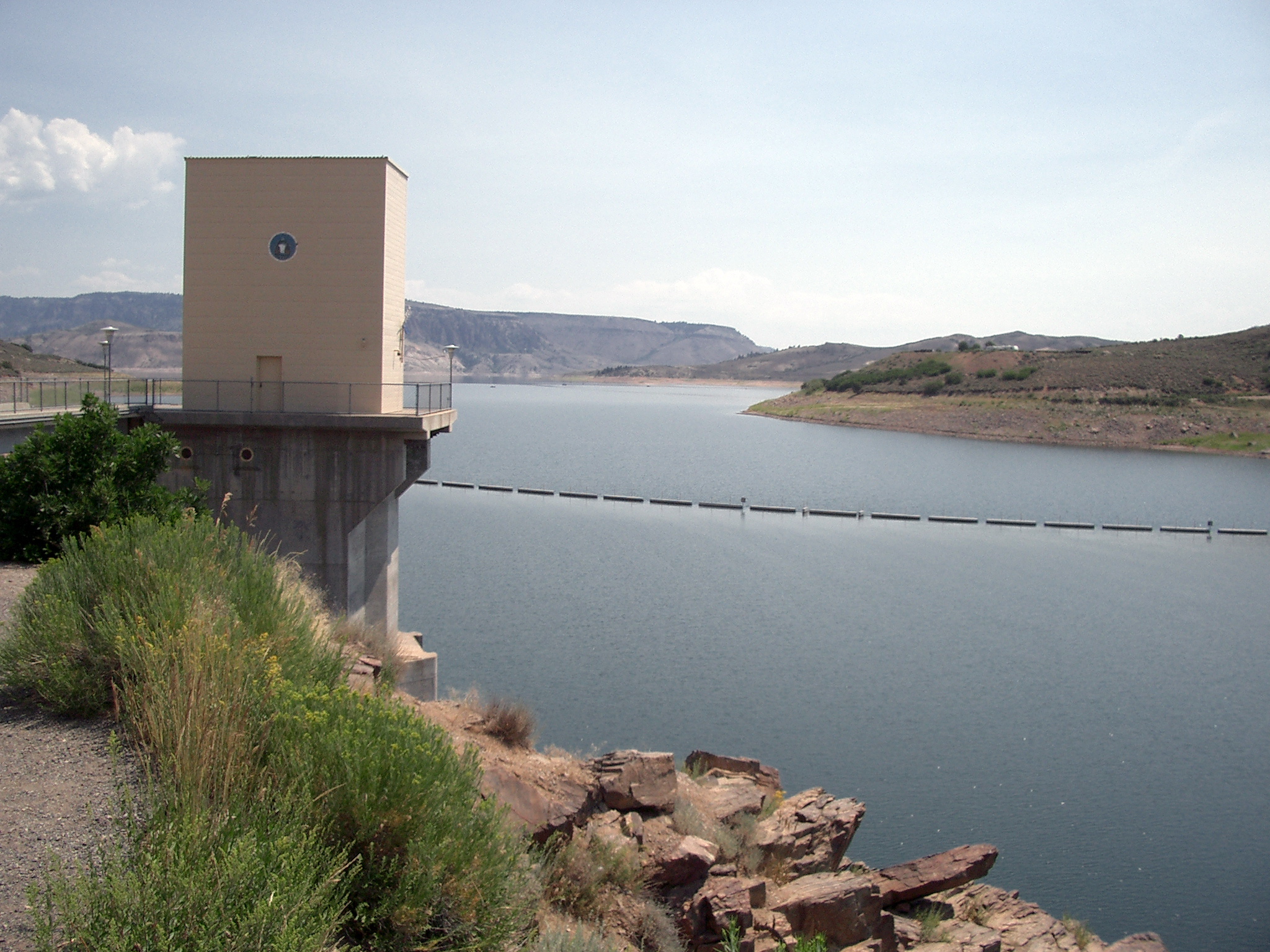
Blue Mesa Reservoir

Blue Mesa Dam bridge
- Coordinates: 38°27′12″N 107°20′02″W
- Carries: State Highway 92

Location
- Interactive map of Blue Mesa Dam bridge

The dam stands in an area where sandstone and shale overlay pre-Cambrian granite, schist and gneiss. It is situated at a narrows in the river valley where the Gunnison enters the upper reaches of the Black Canyon of the Gunnison. The dam has a volume of 3,080,000 cubic yards (2,350,000 m^{3}) and the spillway intake structure has two radial gates. These discharge into a concrete-lined tunnel which in turn discharges through a flip bucket into a stilling basin.

== History ==
The Curecanti Project (later renamed the Wayne N. Aspinall Project) was conceived in 1955, initially with four dams. It was approved by the Secretary of the Interior in 1959, comprising Blue Mesa Dam and Morrow Point Dam. Crystal Dam's design was unfinished and was approved in 1962. Plans for a fourth dam were dropped as uneconomical. The project was restricted to the stretch of the Gunnison above Black Canyon of the Gunnison National Monument (later designated a national park), a 40 miles (64 km) length of the river. Initially planned as a concrete dam, the project was changed to an earth-fill design.

Work on the dam started in 1961, with foundation drilling and survey work. Construction of the reservoir required the relocation of US 50 and State Highway 149. This relocation was among the first work to be performed, starting in 1962 and continuing through 1964. The Sapinero Cemetery was also relocated. The primary construction contract for the dam was awarded to the Tecon Corporation of Dallas, Texas, with notice to proceed on April 23, 1962. The diversion tunnel was holed through on September 7, 1962, with the excavation of the spillway tunnel completed by April 1963. Drilling and grouting for the dam's foundation started in March 1963. The Gunnison was diverted through its tunnel in October, with excavation of the foundation to bedrock immediately after. Placement of the dam embankments started in 1964, and continued through the year, with the dam embankment completed at the end of 1965. The diversion tunnel was partly closed in December and the reservoir began to fill, with the final closure of the diversion tunnel on February 7, 1966. The dam project was declared complete on October 19, 1966.

The powerplant project was delayed by a delivery accident to a transformer, which was damaged in an accident in September 1966 near Monarch Pass and had to be shipped back to its manufacturer in Sweden for repair. The powerplant was completed on February 16, 1968.

Spillway modifications took place in 1984-85 to repair the damage, while a uniform and largely cosmetic covering of riprap was applied to the dam face.

== Powerplant ==
The Blue Mesa Powerplant is fed by one 16-foot (4.9 m) diameter penstock, which supplies two turbines, as well as feeding the outlet works. The laterals feeding the Francis turbines are controlled by 156-inch (4.0 m) butterfly valves. The initial generating capacity was 60 MW, increased in 1988 to 86.4 MW. The powerplant is located above ground at the toe of the dam. It operates as a peaking plant.
