= Blue Mesa Reservoir =

Lake on the Gunnison River in Colorado, United States

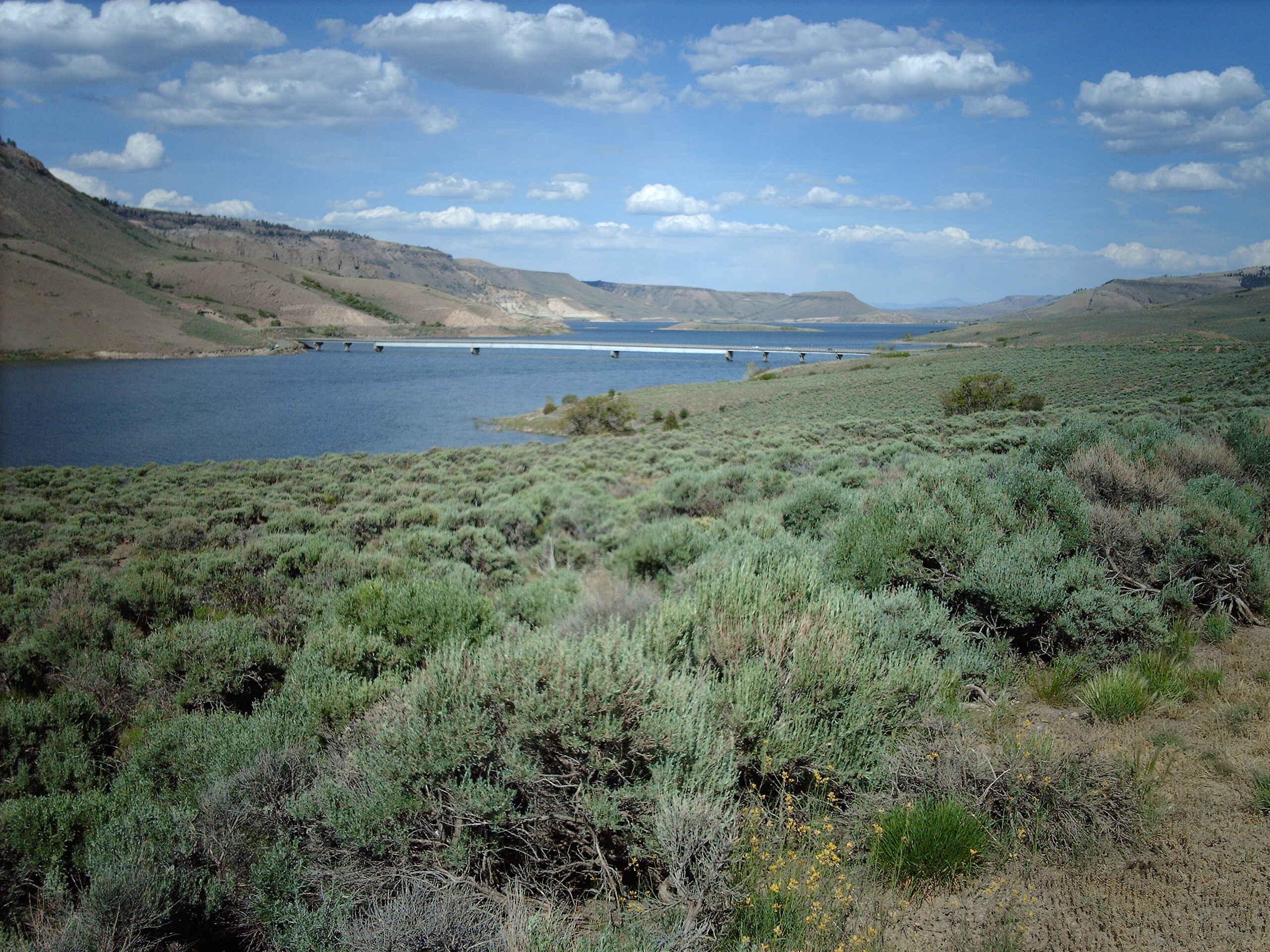

- Location within Colorado Location within the United States
- Location: Gunnison County, Colorado
- Coordinates: 38.4703°N 107.2204°W
- Type: reservoir
- Primary inflows: Gunnison River, Lake Fork Arm of the Gunnison River, Soap Creek, Cebolla Creek
- Primary outflows: Gunnison River
- Basin countries: United States
- Max. length: 20 mi (32 km)
- Surface area: 9,180 acres (3,720 ha)
- Water volume: 940,800 acre-feet (1,160.5 GL)
- Shore length^{1}: 96 mi (154 km)
- Surface elevation: 7,519 ft (2,292 m)
- ^{1} Shore length is not a well-defined measure.

Blue Mesa Reservoir is an artificial reservoir located on the upper reaches of the Gunnison River in Gunnison County, Colorado. The largest lake located entirely within the state, Blue Mesa Reservoir was created by the construction of Blue Mesa Dam, a 390-foot-tall (120 m) earthfill dam constructed on the Gunnison by the U.S. Bureau of Reclamation in 1966 for the generation of hydroelectric power. Managed as part of the Curecanti National Recreation Area, a unit of the National Park Service, Blue Mesa Reservoir is the largest lake trout and Kokanee salmon fishery in Colorado.

== History ==
In 1956, the U.S. Bureau of Reclamation was given the responsibility, under the Colorado River Storage Project Act, to begin planning and construction of the Colorado River Storage Project (CRSP), a series of projects in Colorado, New Mexico, Utah, and Wyoming that would make possible comprehensive development of the waters of the Colorado River and its major tributaries. One of the initial projects of the CRSP, the Curecanti Unit, focused on the upper reaches of the Gunnison River, the fifth-largest tributary of the Colorado River.

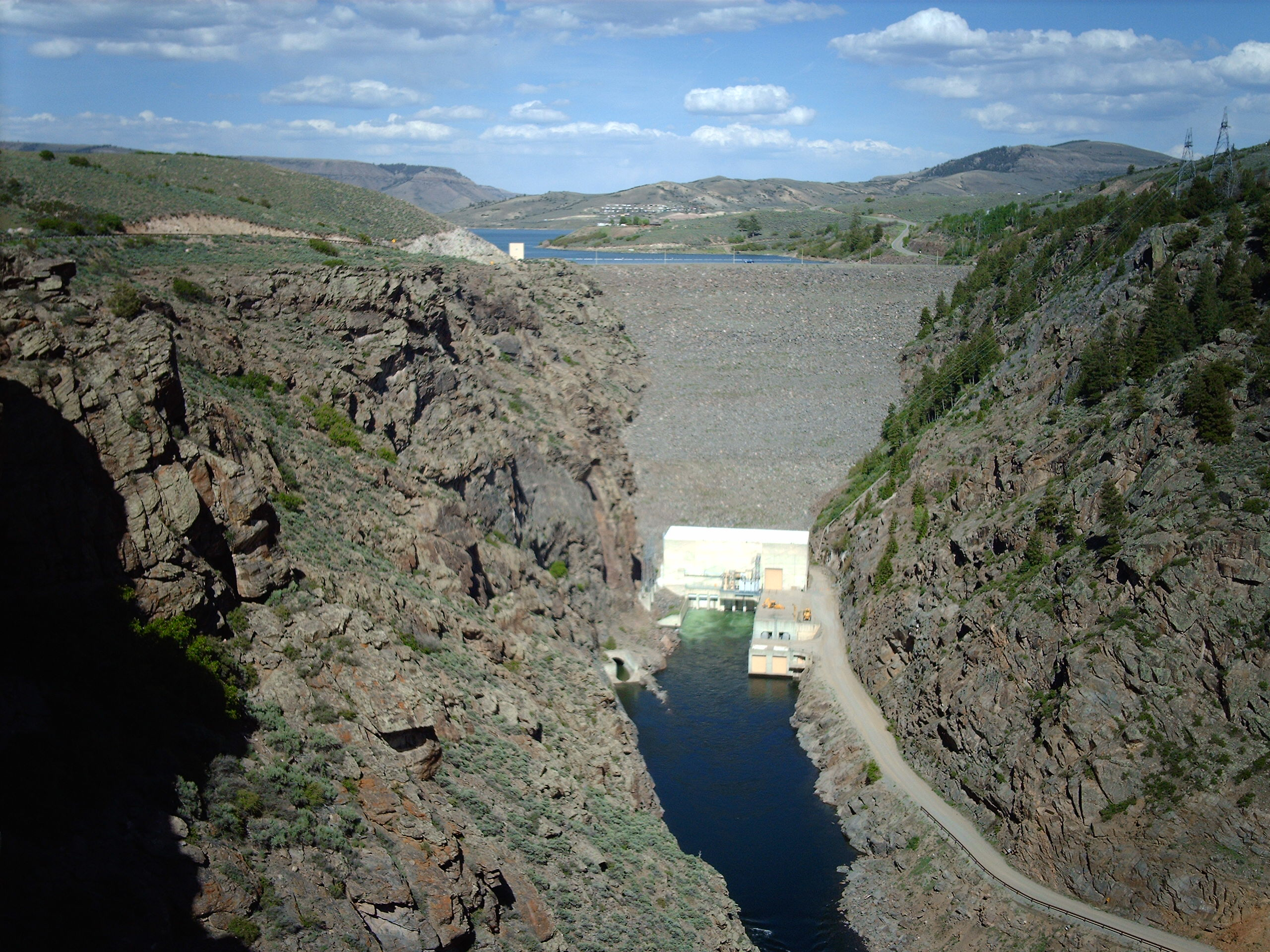
Blue Mesa Dam

The centerpiece of the plans for the Gunnison was the construction of four dams on a 40-mile stretch (64 km) of the river east of the National Park Service's Black Canyon of the Gunnison National Park, projects that would not only help control the amount of water flowing into the Colorado, but would also create new opportunities for flood control, water storage, and the generation of hydroelectric power. The first of these dams was Blue Mesa Dam, which was begun in 1962 approximately 30 miles (48 km) west of Gunnison, and 1.5 miles (2.4 km) west of Sapinero. Finished four years later, the dam created Blue Mesa Reservoir, which became the primary water storage reservoir for the Curecanti Unit (later renamed the Wayne N. Aspinall Unit).

== Climate ==
According to the Köppen Climate Classification system, Blue Mesa Reservoir has a warm-summer humid continental climate, abbreviated "Dfb" on climate maps. The hottest temperature recorded here was 96 °F (36 °C) on July 22, 2005, while the coldest temperature recorded was −36 °F (−38 °C) on January 7, 1971.

Climate data for Blue Mesa Lake, Colorado, 1991–2020 normals, extremes 1970–present
Month	Jan	Feb	Mar	Apr	May	Jun	Jul	Aug	Sep	Oct	Nov	Dec	Year
Record high °F (°C)	56 (13)	54 (12)	69 (21)	79 (26)	87 (31)	94 (34)	96 (36)	94 (34)	89 (32)	81 (27)	67 (19)	55 (13)	96 (36)
Mean maximum °F (°C)	41.1 (5.1)	45.6 (7.6)	59.4 (15.2)	70.7 (21.5)	79.3 (26.3)	86.9 (30.5)	90.8 (32.7)	88.4 (31.3)	83.4 (28.6)	75.1 (23.9)	60.5 (15.8)	45.5 (7.5)	91.2 (32.9)
Mean daily maximum °F (°C)	25.5 (−3.6)	30.5 (−0.8)	43.5 (6.4)	55.5 (13.1)	65.7 (18.7)	77.1 (25.1)	82.6 (28.1)	79.9 (26.6)	72.5 (22.5)	60.0 (15.6)	44.0 (6.7)	28.5 (−1.9)	55.4 (13.0)
Daily mean °F (°C)	12.2 (−11.0)	16.9 (−8.4)	29.3 (−1.5)	39.8 (4.3)	48.8 (9.3)	58.0 (14.4)	64.4 (18.0)	62.6 (17.0)	54.7 (12.6)	43.4 (6.3)	29.8 (−1.2)	16.0 (−8.9)	39.7 (4.2)
Mean daily minimum °F (°C)	−1.2 (−18.4)	3.4 (−15.9)	15.1 (−9.4)	24.2 (−4.3)	31.9 (−0.1)	38.8 (3.8)	46.2 (7.9)	45.3 (7.4)	37.0 (2.8)	26.8 (−2.9)	15.5 (−9.2)	3.4 (−15.9)	23.9 (−4.5)
Mean minimum °F (°C)	−18.1 (−27.8)	−13.2 (−25.1)	−1.4 (−18.6)	13.8 (−10.1)	22.4 (−5.3)	31.5 (−0.3)	38.6 (3.7)	38.0 (3.3)	26.9 (−2.8)	15.6 (−9.1)	1.7 (−16.8)	−12.7 (−24.8)	−20.1 (−28.9)
Record low °F (°C)	−36 (−38)	−34 (−37)	−18 (−28)	5 (−15)	6 (−14)	22 (−6)	30 (−1)	26 (−3)	20 (−7)	3 (−16)	−14 (−26)	−25 (−32)	−36 (−38)
Average precipitation inches (mm)	0.69 (18)	0.73 (19)	0.53 (13)	0.59 (15)	0.66 (17)	0.43 (11)	0.86 (22)	1.13 (29)	1.01 (26)	0.88 (22)	0.49 (12)	0.81 (21)	8.81 (225)
Average snowfall inches (cm)	12.4 (31)	10.5 (27)	6.1 (15)	2.9 (7.4)	0.4 (1.0)	0.0 (0.0)	0.0 (0.0)	0.0 (0.0)	0.0 (0.0)	1.1 (2.8)	4.3 (11)	11.9 (30)	49.6 (125.2)
Average precipitation days (≥ 0.01 in)	7.3	6.7	4.0	5.0	5.1	3.8	7.4	8.5	6.9	5.2	5.2	6.8	71.9
Average snowy days (≥ 0.1 in)	6.7	6.2	3.2	1.9	0.2	0.0	0.0	0.0	0.0	0.7	3.1	6.2	28.2
Source 1: NOAA
Source 2: National Weather Service

== Location and access ==
Blue Mesa Dam is located on the Gunnison river approximately 30 miles west of the city of Gunnison, near the intersection of U.S. 50 with Colorado Highway 92, which travels along the top of the dam. The reservoir extends east 20 miles and is composed of three main basins, the Iola, the Cebolla and the Sapinero, from east to west. U.S. 50 traverses the northern shore of both the Iola and Cebolla Basins before crossing the reservoir south on the Middle Bridge and continuing west to the dam.

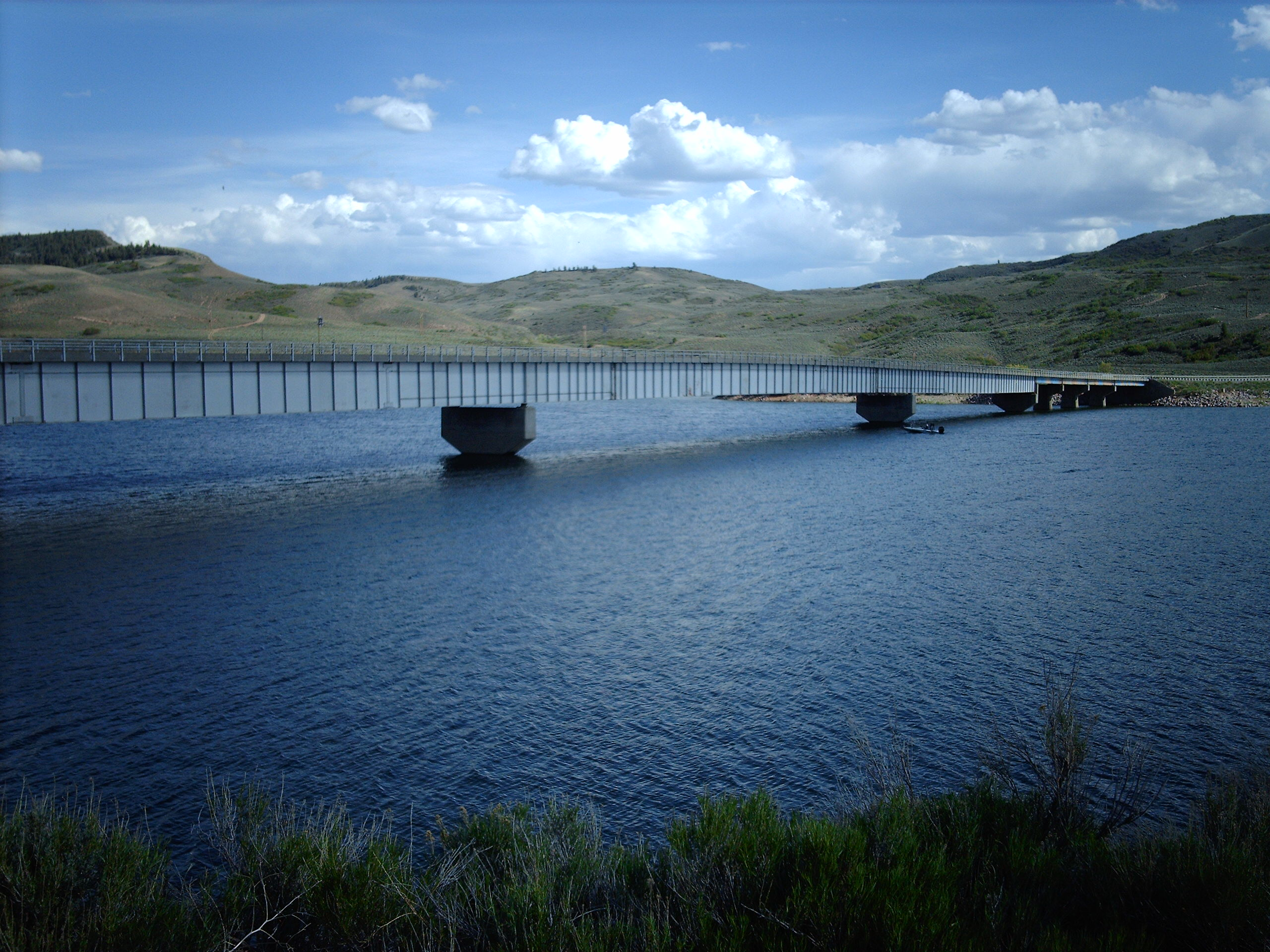
The Middle Bridge crossing Blue Mesa Reservoir near Sapinero.

The southern shore of the Iola Basin can be reached via Colorado Highway 149, which begins at an intersection with U.S. 50 at the Lake City Bridge, approximately 7 miles west of the city of Gunnison. While most of the recreational areas at Blue Mesa can be accessed from U.S. 50, the reservoir also contains a small number of facilities on the lake's deep arms, such as Cebolla Creek and Soap Creek, which can only be reached by boat or unpaved road.

== Recreation activities ==
While it was the Bureau of Reclamation that conceived of the plan to impound the Gunnison and constructed the Blue Mesa Dam, it was the National Park Service that was tasked with developing and managing recreational facilities at Blue Mesa Reservoir and the two smaller lakes to the west. As a unit of the Curecanti National Recreation Area Blue Mesa Reservoir offers a number of recreational opportunities, including boating, fishing, boat-in, developed, and primitive camping, hiking, horseback riding, and hunting. A popular lake for boating, Blue Mesa has marinas at Elk Creek and Lake Fork, near the dam, both of which can be accessed by U.S. 50. Watercraft can also be launched from the Ponderosa and Stevens Creek campgrounds, and at Iola, on the reservoir's southern shore. During winter months Iola Basin is also a popular spot for ice fishing.

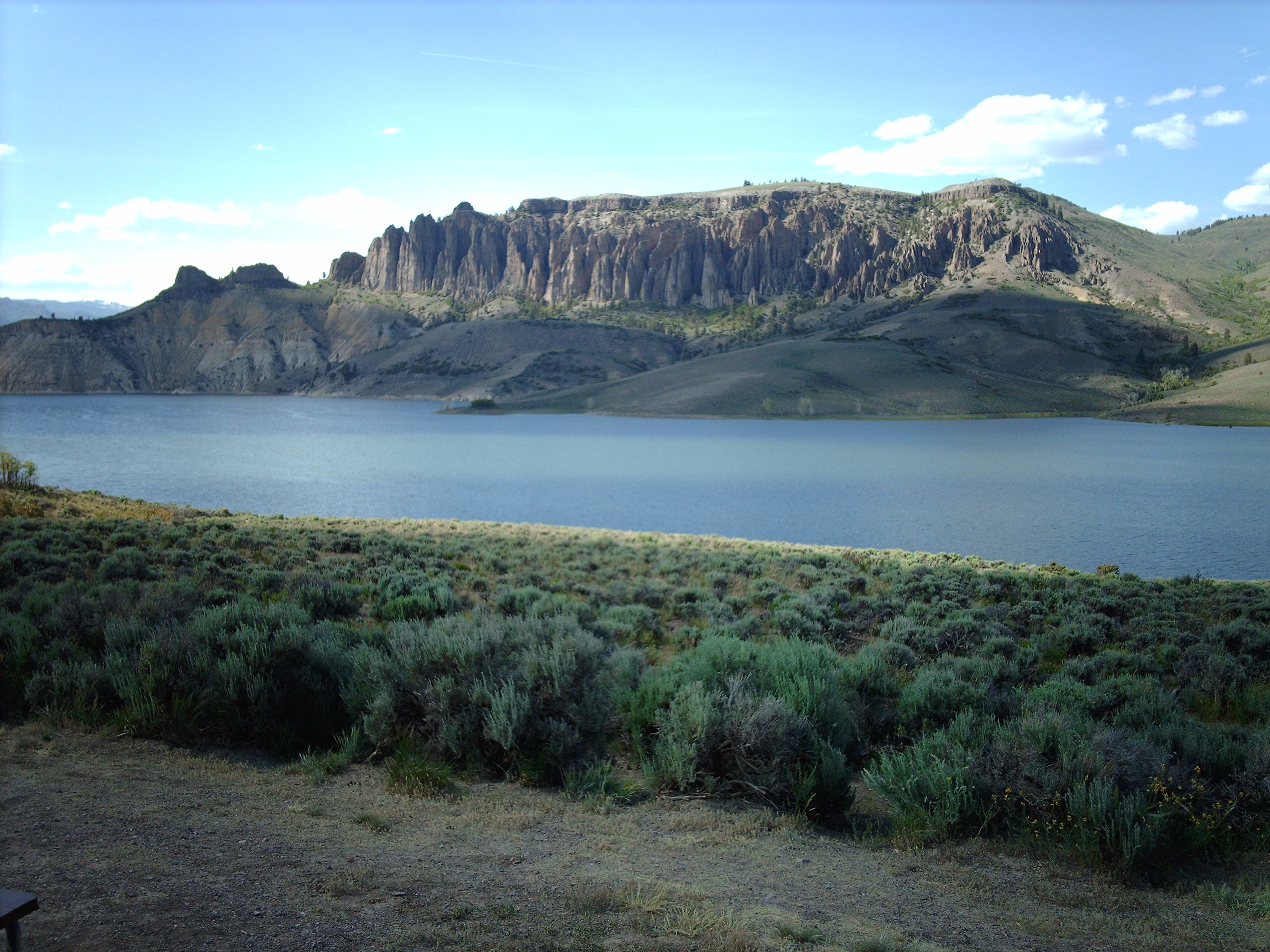
The Dillon Pinnacles, Blue Mesa Reservoir

Blue Mesa contains 8 developed campgrounds, two of which are designated for groups. These range from the 160-site Elk Creek on the main body of the lake to smaller, more remote sites like Ponderosa and Gateview located on arms of the lake. Several of the campsites can accommodate RV's, but only Elk Creek offers electrical hook-ups. Boaters may camp overnight in 4 free camping areas with a total of 9 individual sites. Boaters may also camp on the southern shore of the Cebolla and Iola Basins, as long as campsites are not within a half-mile of any developed area, bridge, maintained public road or other boat-in/backcountry campsite.

In 2022, decreases in Blue Mesa's already low water level caused by drought and the need to release water to aid Lake Powell downriver led to the first cancellation of boating season as announced on May 1, 2022. Federal and state water managers indicated in early May, 2022 the plan for 2022 would allow the Blue Mesa Reservoir to recover water levels, although they would remain insufficient for opening the marinas.

== Nearby attractions ==
In addition to Blue Mesa Reservoir, Curecanti NRA also contains two other Bureau of Reclamation projects, Morrow Point Reservoir and Crystal Reservoir. Part of the same project that created Blue Mesa, both Morrow Point and Crystal are smaller, narrower lakes, located within the Black Canyon of the Gunnison. Though considerably harder to access than Blue Mesa, these two lakes nevertheless offer visitors unique views and challenging recreational opportunities. West of Blue Mesa and immediately downriver from Crystal Dam is Black Canyon of the Gunnison National Park, a National Park Service unit that offers camping, hiking, and views of the river and the surrounding 1900-ft. deep canyon. North of the reservoir is the Gunnison Ranger District of the Grand Mesa, Uncompahgre and Gunnison National Forests, a unit of the U.S. Forest Service. The Gunnison Ranger District includes almost 30 campgrounds and a number of hiking and equestrian trails spread across 1.3 million acres. Towns near Blue Mesa include Gunnison to the east and Montrose and Delta to the west, all of which can be accessed via U.S. 50.

== See also ==
- List of largest reservoirs of Colorado
- Colorado River Storage Project
- Curecanti National Recreation Area
- Blue Mesa Dam
- Morrow Point Reservoir
- Crystal Reservoir
