= Curecanti National Recreation Area =

National Park Service in Colorado, US

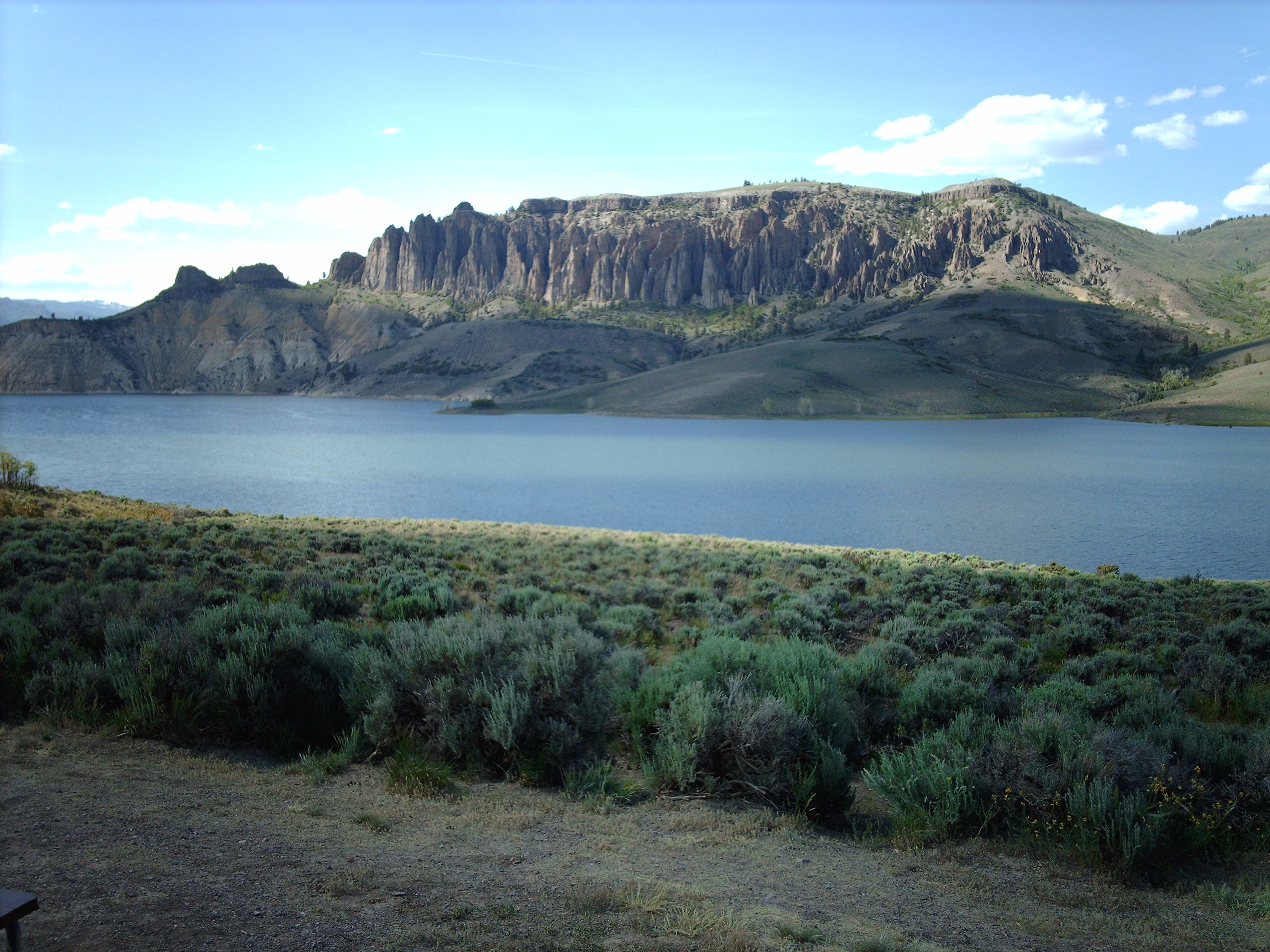
- The Dillon Pinnacles in Curecanti NRA.

- Location within Colorado Location within the United States
- Location: Gunnison and Montrose counties, Colorado, United States
- Nearest city: Gunnison, CO
- Coordinates: 38°27′17″N 107°19′37″W
- Area: 43,095 acres (174.40 km^{2})
- Established: February 6, 1965
- Visitors: 807,117 (in 2025)
- Governing body: National Park Service
- Website: Curecanti National Recreation Area

Curecanti National Recreation Area (Pronounced /kɜːrɪˈkɑːntiː/ (locally) or /kuːrɪˈkɑːntiː/.) is a National Park Service unit located on the Gunnison River in western Colorado. Established in 1965, Curecanti National Recreation Area is responsible for developing and managing recreational facilities on three reservoirs, Blue Mesa Reservoir, Morrow Point Reservoir and Crystal Reservoir, constructed on the upper Gunnison River in the 1960s by the U.S. Bureau of Reclamation to better utilize the vital waters of the Colorado River and its major tributaries. A popular destination for boating and fishing, Curecanti offers visitors two marinas, traditional and group campgrounds, hiking trails, boat launches, and boat-in campsites. The state's premiere lake trout and Kokanee salmon fisheries, Curecanti is a popular destination for boating and fishing, and is also a popular area for ice-fishing in the winter months.

== Park history ==
In 1922 seven western states, all of which contained some part of the Colorado River or its major tributaries, signed an agreement to regulate the use of the vital waters of the river system. Allotments were made and each state was guaranteed a certain amount of water annually. To facilitate this effort, the member states were divided into upper and lower groups, based on geography. Recognizing their total dependence on the upper group states, whose mountain snow melts contributed the most water to the river system, the states of the lower group, California, Nevada, and Arizona, began to build dams, such as the Hoover Dam, to create storage reservoirs on their parts of the river system. By the 1950s, the upper states, Colorado, Utah, New Mexico, and Wyoming, obligated to send a set amount of water downstream regardless of seasonal fluctuations in water levels, also began to see the wisdom of creating a system of dams and reservoirs. To grant the four states the authority to begin this process, Congress passed the Colorado River Storage Act on April 11, 1956. An important legal milestone in the tortuous history of the western water law, the Act created the Colorado River Storage Project, and authorized four main projects, one of which was located on the Gunnison River in western Colorado, the fifth largest tributary of the Colorado River. This project, originally called the Curecanti Project, was tasked with building three dams on the upper reaches of the Gunnison, approximately 27 miles west of the city of Gunnison. Curecanti was named for a 19th-century Ute Indian sub-chief.

The resulting reservoirs, Blue Mesa, Morrow Point, and Crystal, would not only make possible water storage for transfer to the lower group states, but also for local agricultural use. Impounding this section of the river would also create new opportunities for flood control, the generation of hydro-electric power, and recreation. To help fulfill the recreation aspect of the project the National Park Service was given the responsibility to design and manage recreational opportunities on the three reservoirs. In 1965 the Park Service formed a cooperative agreement with the Bureau of Reclamation that established Curecanti National Recreation Area, a new unit that would encompass all three reservoirs, as well as short sections of the river above and below, build campgrounds, marinas and lake access points, protect, research and interpret the natural environment and local history, and manage game and fish populations.

Curecanti's boundary is based on the 1965 memorandum of agreement and is, unusually for the NPS, not legislated, resulting in difficulties in management. Pending 2021 legislation would finally establish legal boundaries, transfer land from the BOR to NPS, and increase its area from about 43,000 to 50,000 acres by transferring land from the Gunnison National Forest and Bureau of Land Management.

== Units and access ==
Beginning on the river approximately 5 miles west of Gunnison, and ending on the river at the eastern border of the Black Canyon of the Gunnison National Park, Curecanti contains four main areas:

=== Blue Mesa Reservoir ===
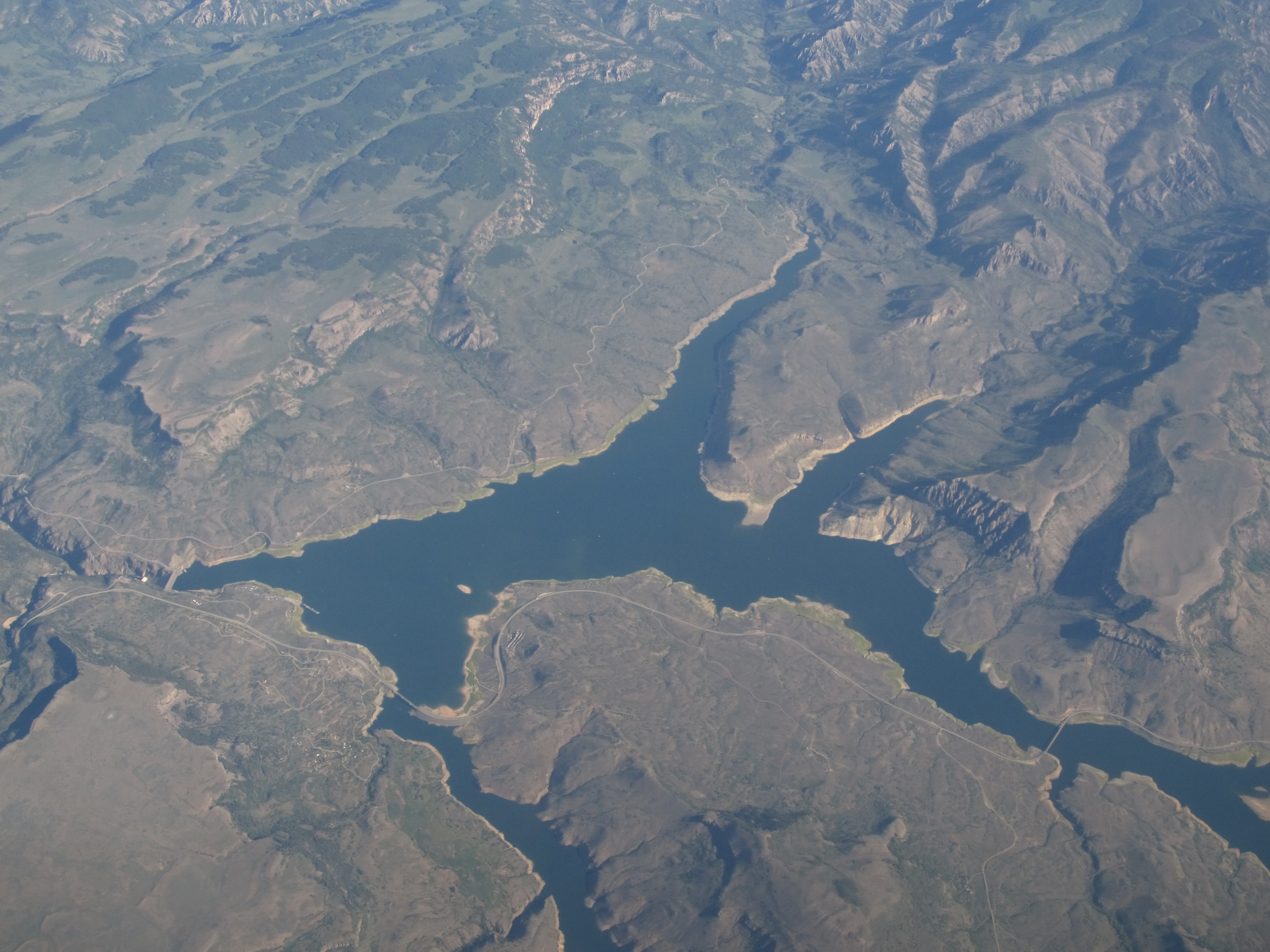
Blue Mesa Reservoir from the air.

Created by the construction of Blue Mesa Dam in 1966, Blue Mesa Reservoir is Colorado's largest body of water. Fed by the Lake Fork Arm of the Gunnison River, Soap Creek, and Cebolla Creek, the long, broad lake is 20 miles (32 km) long, has 96 miles (154 km) of shoreline, and is the largest Lake Trout and Kokanee salmon fishery in the United States. The majority of the park's visitor and recreational facilities are located around Blue Mesa and can be accessed by that section of U.S. 50 between Gunnison and Montrose, which traverses the entire length of the reservoir. Other facilities can be found on the lake's deep arms, such as Cebolla Creek and Soap Creek, which can only be reached by boat or unpaved road.

=== Morrow Point Reservoir ===
Located immediately west of Blue Mesa, Morrow Point Reservoir was created by the construction of Morrow Point Dam located 12 miles west of Blue Mesa Dam. Located in the upper reaches of the Black Canyon, the narrow, steep-sided Morrow Point offers visitors a very different environment than the expansive Blue Mesa. More remote and difficult to access than Blue Mesa, Morrow Point offers few recreational facilities but can be accessed by hand-launched boats from Pine Creek, a trailhead on U.S. 50 approximately 1 mile west of Blue Mesa Dam.

==== The Needle ====
Morrow Point Reservoir is the location of the Curecanti Needle, a striking and unique 700-ft tall granite spire on the reservoir's southern bank. For many years the Needle was a well-known symbol of the Denver & Rio Grande Western Railroad, who used the easily recognizable spire as a marketing symbol for their Black Canyon Route, which passed the Needle on the north side of the river. Now a popular destination for climbers, the Needle can only be accessed by hand-launched boat, or by crossing the frozen river in winter.

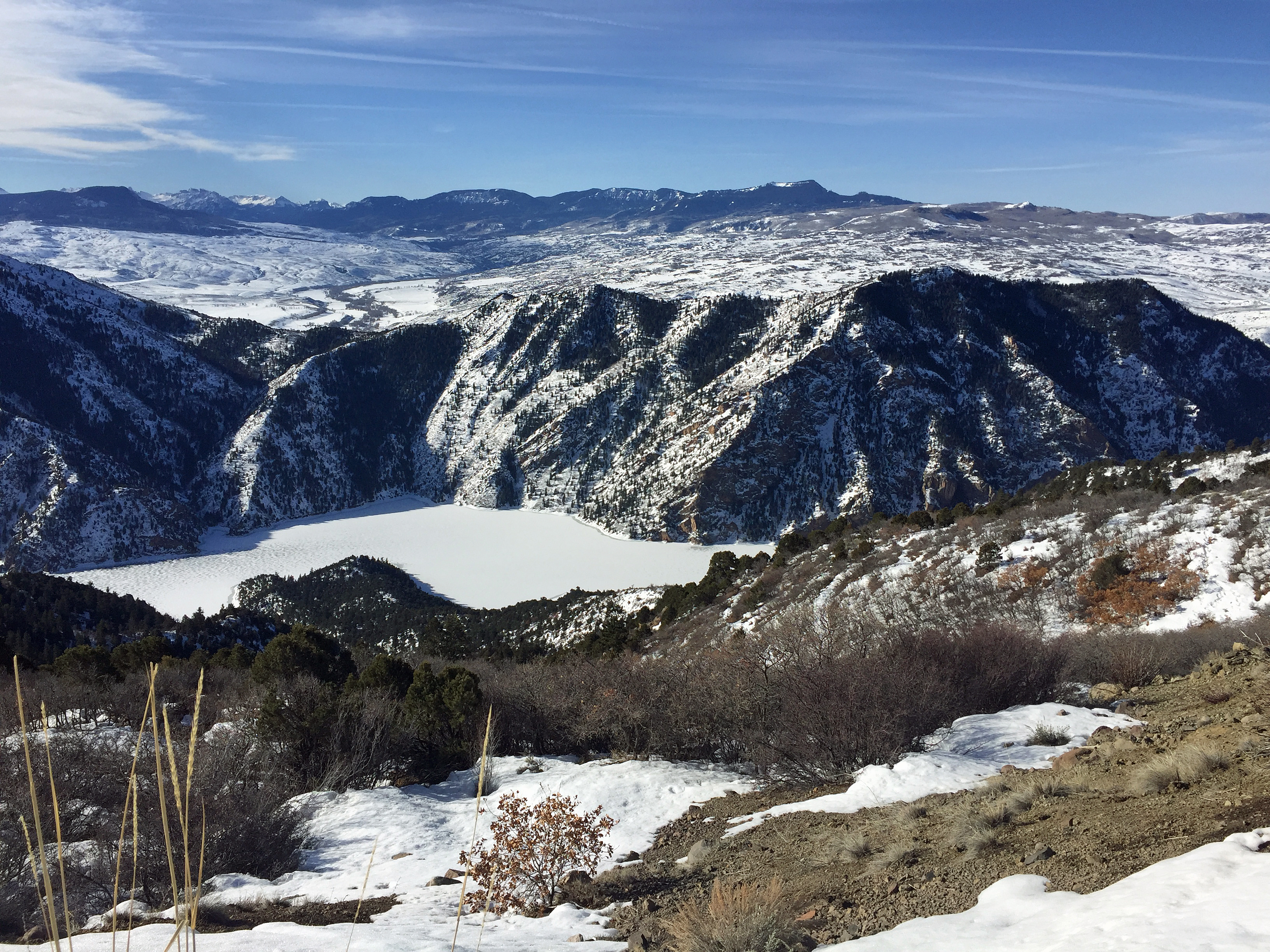
Morrow Point Reservoir in winter.

=== Crystal Reservoir ===
The most remote and least accessible of the three reservoirs, Crystal was formed by the opening of Crystal Dam in 1976. Begun in 1973, seven years after the completion of Blue Mesa Dam, Crystal, located six miles from Morrow Point Dam, was the last of the three dams of the Curecanti Project to be completed when it opened in 1976. The smallest of the three reservoirs, Crystal can be accessed from U.S. 50 at Cimarron, where a short road takes visitors to the water immediately south of Morrow Point Dam.

=== East Portal ===
Located two miles below Crystal Dam at the entry to the Black Canyon of the Gunnison National Park, East Portal is the location of the intake tunnel and diversion dam of the Gunnison Tunnel, a Bureau of Reclamation irrigation project begun in 1902 to divert river water approximately 6 miles from the Gunnison to the dry lands west of Montrose. The East Portal area includes lake access for fishing, developed picnic areas, and both drive-up and drive-in campgrounds. Though part of Curecanti, East Portal can only be accessed by the seasonal East Portal Road, a very steep twisting road located inside the Black Canyon of the Gunnison National Park.

== Visitor and recreation facilities ==
There are three visitor centers in the recreation area, all operated by the National Park Service:

- Elk Creek Visitor Center is located 16 miles (26 km) west of Gunnison, Colorado on U.S. Highway 50 and has displays on the natural and cultural history of the area.
- Cimarron Visitor Center (closed) is located in Cimarron, Colorado near Morrow Point Dam. The visitor center has narrow gauge railroad cars and engines on display.
- Lake Fork Visitor Center (closed) is located near Sapinero, Colorado near the Lake Fork Campground.

=== Boating ===
There are also two marinas and five boat launches along the shores of Blue Mesa Reservoir:

- Elk Creek Marina is located near the visitor center at Elk Creek. This marina also includes a restaurant and boat launch.
- Lake Fork Marina is located near Sapinero, Colorado and is nearby both the Lake Fork campground, visitor center, and boat launch.
- Steven's Creek boat launch on U.S. 50
- Iola boat launch on Colorado Highway 149
- Ponderosa boat launch

Both Morrow Point and Crystal Reservoirs can be accessed by hand-launched watercraft from trailheads at Pine Creek and Cimarron, both of which can be reached via U.S. 50.

=== Recreation ===
Curecanti offers a number of recreational opportunities, including boating, fishing, boat-in, developed, and primitive camping, hiking, horseback riding, and hunting. Facilities on the river east of Blue Mesa include developed picnic areas at Riverway, Neversink, Cooper Ranch, and Beaver Creek, a kayak/canoe launch at Riverway and a nature trail at Neversink. All of these facilities can be reached on U.S. 50, 5 miles west of Gunnison. The area around Blue Mesa Reservoir contains 8 developed campgrounds, two of which are designated for groups. These range from the 160-site Elk Creek on the main body of the lake to smaller, more remote sites, like Ponderosa and Gateview, located on arms of the lake. Several of the campsites can accommodate RV's, but only Elk Creek offers electrical hook-ups. Boaters may camp overnight in 4 free camping areas with a total of 9 individual sites. Boaters may also camp on the southern shore of the Cebolla and Iola Basins, as long as campsites are not within a half-mile of any developed area, bridge, maintained public road or other boat-in/backcountry campsite.

Recreational opportunities at Morrow Point Reservoir include boating (hand-carried craft only), primitive camping, and hiking. There are three small developed areas with lake access, the Pine Creek Trailhead, accessible via U.S. 50 approximately 1 mile west of Blue Mesa Dam, the Pioneer Point Overlook, north of the reservoir on Colorado Highway 92, approximately 5.5 miles west of Blue Mesa Dam, and the Hermit's Rest Trailhead, on Co. 92 approximately 17 miles west of Blue Mesa Dam. Pine Creek offers lake access for hand-carried craft and access to boat-in campsites. Pioneer Point Overlook offers a scenic viewing area and is the trailhead for the strenuous Curecanti Creek trail, a 4-mile (round trip) trail with a 900 ft. elevation change. Two campsites with picnic tables, fire grates, and composting toilets are located at the end of the trail. Hermit's Rest Trailhead gives access to the steep Hermit's Rest Trail, a 6-mile round trip with an 1800 ft. elevation change that ends with two campsites equipped with picnic tables, fire grates, and composting toilets.

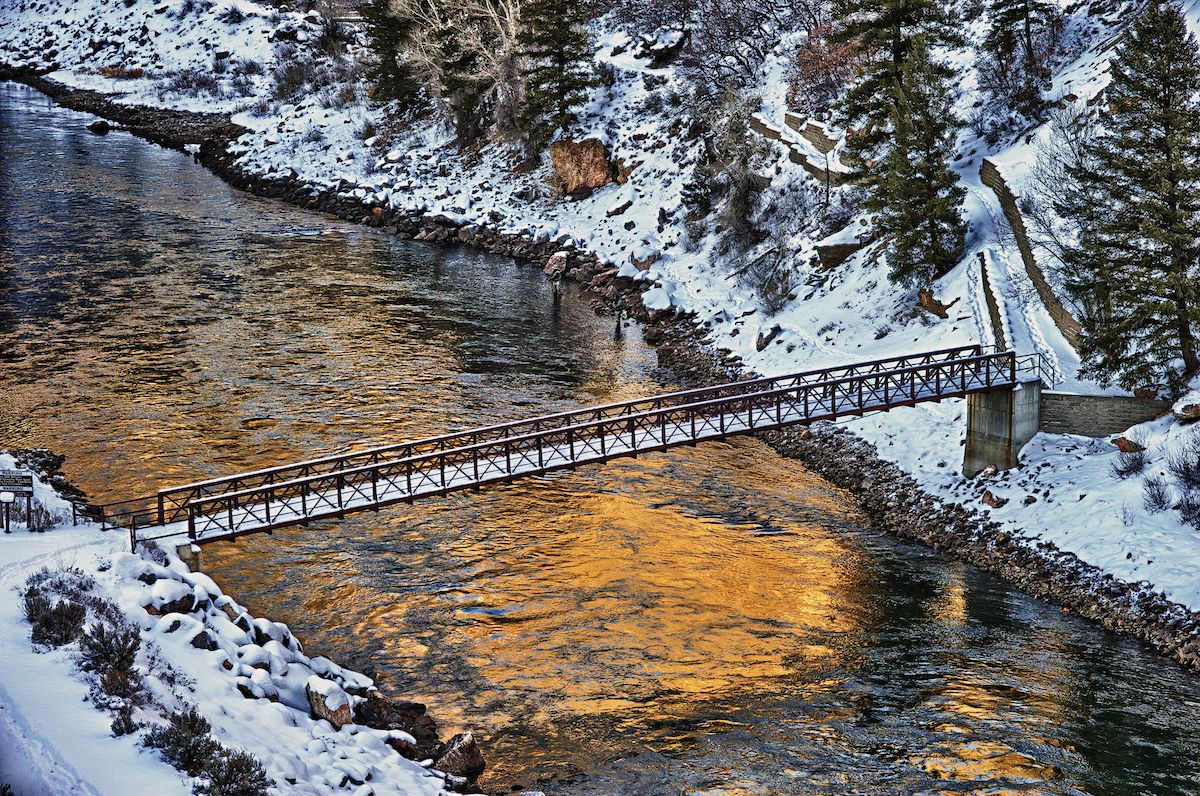
Bridge over Crystal Reservoir at Cimarron.

Recreational opportunities around Crystal Reservoir include boating (hand-carried craft only), camping, and hiking. There are two small developed areas near the reservoir, Mesa Creek Trailhead and Crystal Creek Trailhead. Mesa Creek Trailhead is located immediately west of Point Morrow Dam, and can be accessed from a one-mile road running north of U.S. 50 at Cimarron.

Preserved rail bridge over Cimarron Creek

Hand-launched watercraft can be launched into Crystal from Mesa Creek. A single boat-in campsite is located approximately 4 miles west of Mesa Creek at the mouth of Crystal Creek. Mesa Creek is also the trailhead for the Mesa Creek Trail, a fairly to moderately strenuous 1.5 mile round trip that crosses the reservoir on a footbridge and travels west along the north shore. Though Mesa Creek is a day-use facility, developed campsites are available at nearby Cimarron. Crystal Creek Trailhead is located on Colorado Highway 92, 24 miles west of Blue Mesa Dam and offers access to the 5-mile (round trip) Crystal Creek Trail. Moderately strenuous, Crystal Creek trail does reach the water but ends at an overlook 1800 ft. above the reservoir.

Other recreational facilities at Curecanti include horse corrals, for equestrian campers, at Dry Gulch, Ponderosa, and Soap Creek, and the Dillon Pinnacles Trail, a moderately strenuous 4 mile round trip to the Dillon Pinnacles, a ridge of strikingly eroded volcanic rock that has become one of the most identifiable images of the park.

== Other attractions ==
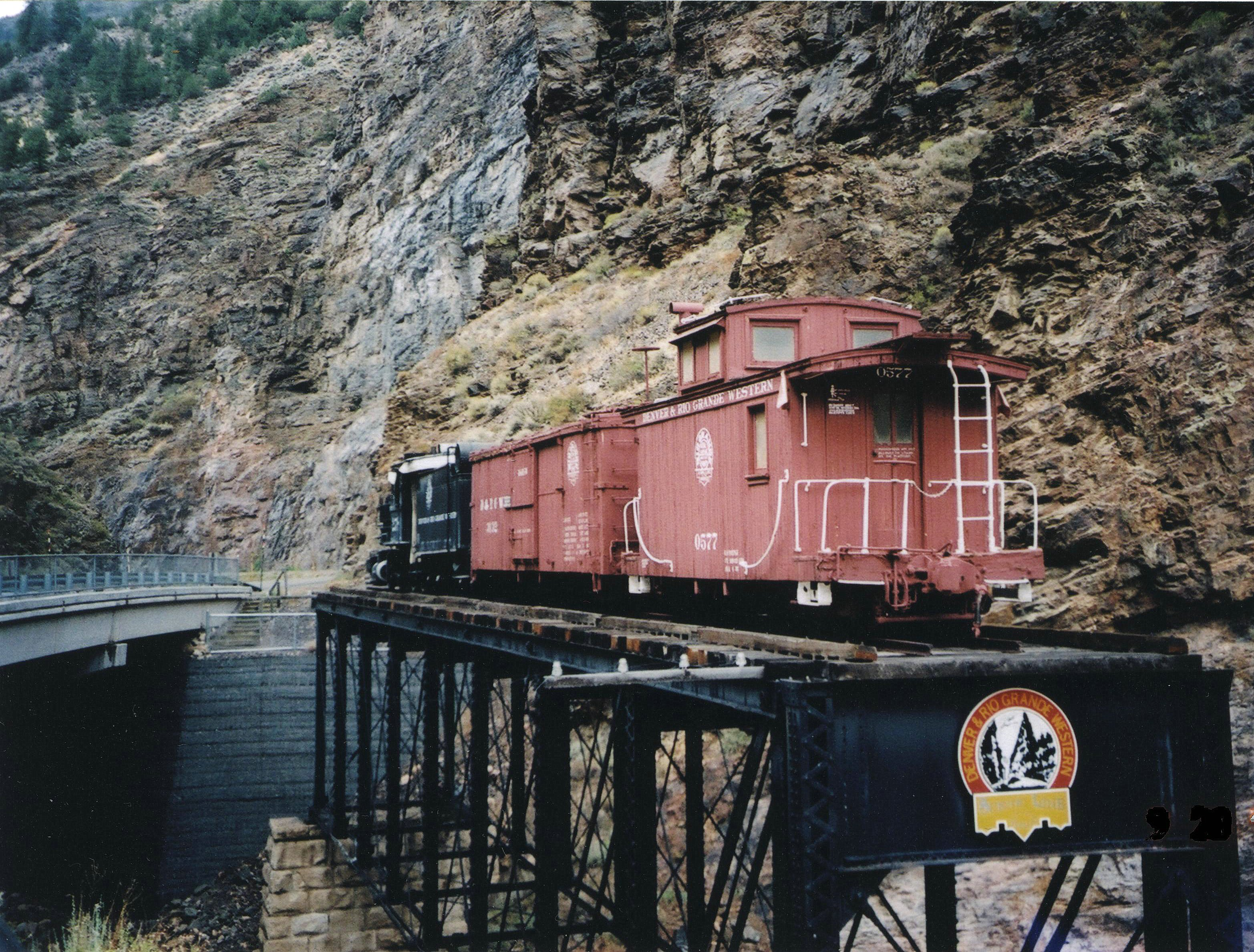
Denver and Rio Grande Western Railroad Narrow Gauge Trestle

The Denver and Rio Grande Western Railroad Narrow Gauge Trestle is located in Cimarron Canyon near Morrow Point Dam. It is the last remaining narrow gauge railroad trestle in the Black Canyon of the Gunnison. The trestle was built in 1895 by the Denver and Rio Grande Western Railroad and was placed on the National Register of Historic Places in 1976.
