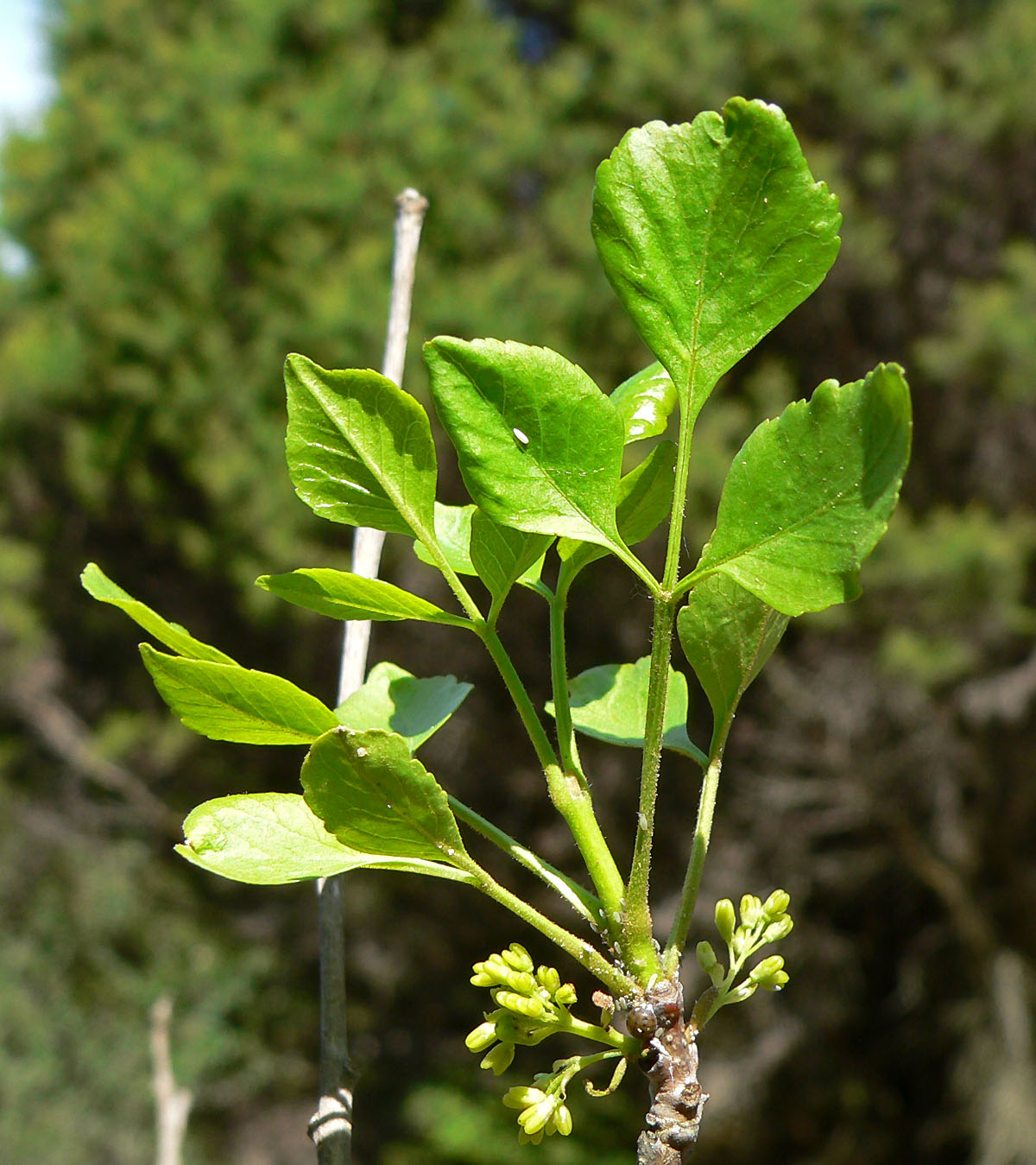

Conservation status
- Apparently Secure (NatureServe)

Scientific classification
- Kingdom: Plantae
- Clade: Tracheophytes
- Clade: Angiosperms
- Clade: Eudicots
- Clade: Asterids
- Order: Lamiales
- Family: Oleaceae
- Genus: Fraxinus
- Section: Fraxinus sect. Dipetalae
- Species: F. anomala

Binomial name
- Fraxinus anomala Torr. ex S.Watson

Varieties
- F. a. var. anomala; F. a. var. triphylla
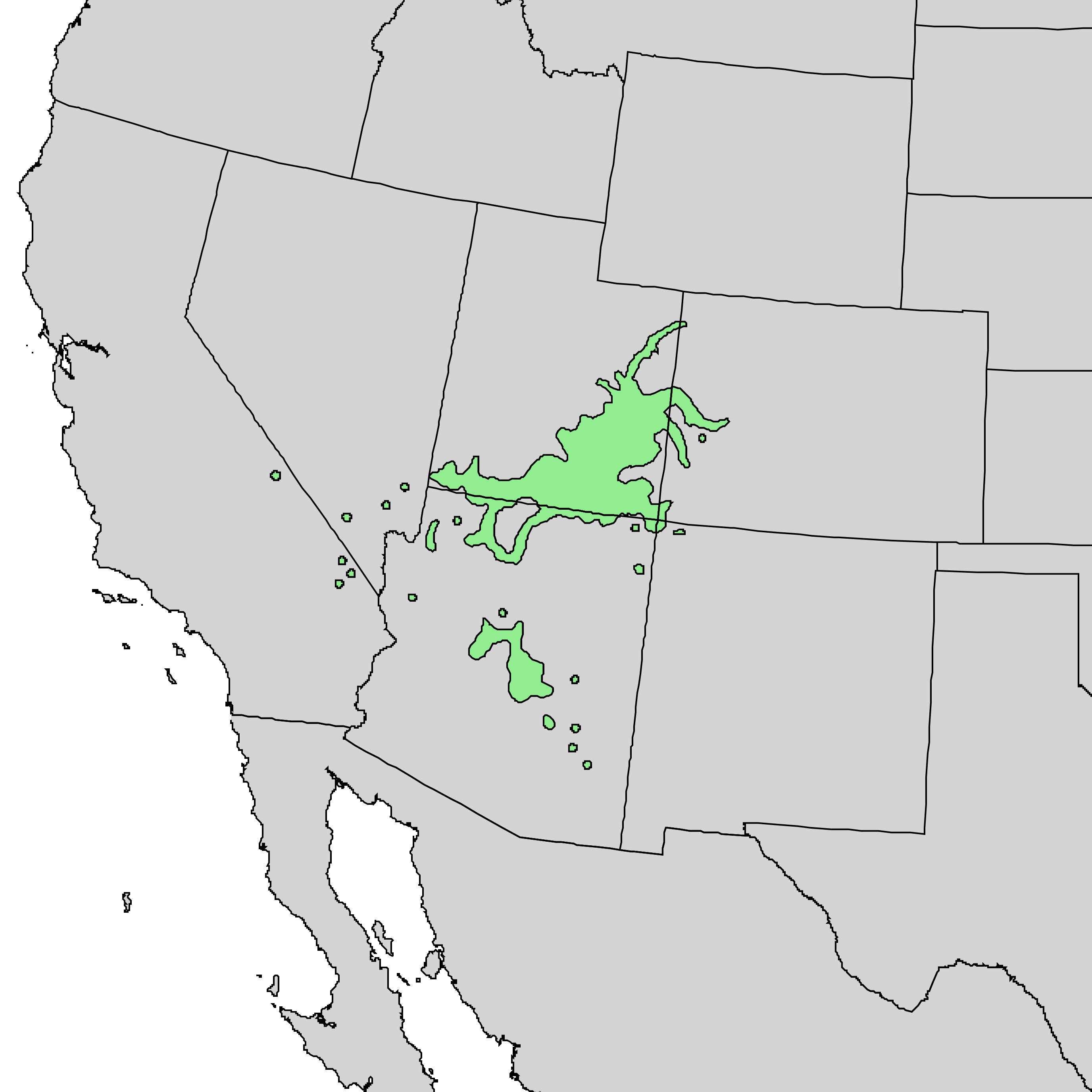
- Natural range of Fraxinus anomala

= Fraxinus anomala =

Species of ash tree

Fraxinus anomala is a species of ash tree known by the common name single-leaf ash. It is native to the southwestern United States and northern Mexico, where it grows in a number of habitats including desert scrub and chaparral. It is unusual in the genus in that some (though not all) specimens have simple leaves instead of the pinnate leaves more characteristic of the group.

== Description ==
Fraxinus anomala is a deciduous shrub or small tree approaching maximum heights of five to six meters. The leaf may be simple or it may be compound, composed of up to five leaflets which look like individual leaves. Each leaflet is oval-shaped to round and may have teeth along the edges. The undistinguished brownish flowers lack petals. The fruit is a flat samara up to two centimeters long and one wide, green when young and tan to brown when mature. The samaras hang in bunches.

== Distribution ==
In Arizona, singleleaf ash is found along the Arizona transition zone of the Mogollon Rim. In northern Arizona's Grand Canyon, the range extends down the main canyons from southern and southeastern Utah, its major range area, where the Canyon Lands also show the range entering upper reaches of river basins flowing from western Colorado – Colorado and Dolores Rivers; also the shorter Yellowjacket and McElmo Rivers in Colorado's extreme southwest. In the Mojave Desert of California, it is found in the sky island chaparral and woodland habitats. Minor locales also occur in southern Nevada and southern Wyoming.
