= Sapinero, Colorado =

Unincorporated community in Gunnison County, CO, USA

- Unincorporated community
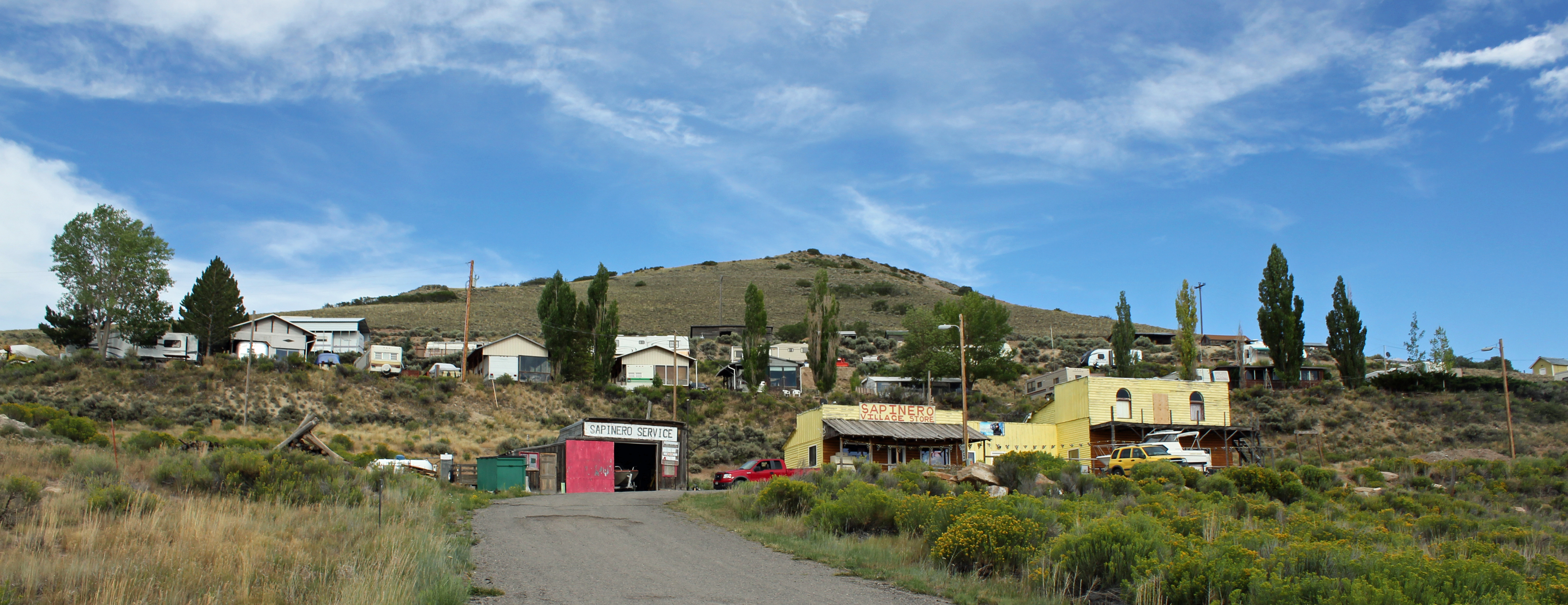
- Sapinero in 2014

- Location within Colorado Location within the United States
- Coordinates: 38°27′34″N 107°18′08″W
- Country: United States
- State: Colorado
- County: Gunnison County
- Elevation: 7,622 ft (2,323 m)
- Time zone: UTC-7 (MST)
  - Summer (DST): UTC-6 (MDT)
- ZIP code: 81247 (Gunnison)
- Area code: 970
- GNIS feature ID: 188204

Sapinero is an unincorporated community located on U.S. Route 50, along the shore of Blue Mesa Reservoir in the Curecanti National Recreation Area in Gunnison County, Colorado, United States.

== History ==
The community was named after Chief Sapinero, a Ute Indian.

Sapinero's original location was on the north bank of the Gunnison River, just downstream from the mouth of Soap Creek, about one mile north of its current location. Sapinero was originally a stop on the Denver & Rio Grande Railroad's narrow gauge main line between Denver and Salt Lake City. The narrow gauge's final abandonment came in 1955. In about 1963, when Blue Mesa Dam was built on the Gunnison River below Sapinero, the town was moved and re-established in its present location, prior to the area's inundation by the water of Blue Mesa Reservoir.

The U.S. Post Office at Gunnison (ZIP Code 81230) now serves Sapinero postal addresses.

== Climate ==
Climate type is dominated by the winter season, a long, bitterly cold period with short, clear days, relatively little precipitation mostly in the form of snow, and low humidity. The Köppen Climate Classification sub-type for this climate is "Dfc" (Continental Subarctic Climate).

== See also ==
- List of municipalities in Colorado
