= List of Art Deco architecture in Colorado =

Coordinates: 38.9972°N 105.5478°W

The location of the State of Colorado in the United States of America.

This is a list of buildings that are examples of the Art Deco architectural style in the U.S. State of Colorado.

== Aurora ==
- Aurora Fox Arts Center, Aurora, 1946
- Fitzsimons Army Medical Center, Aurora, 1941
- KOA Building, Aurora, 1932

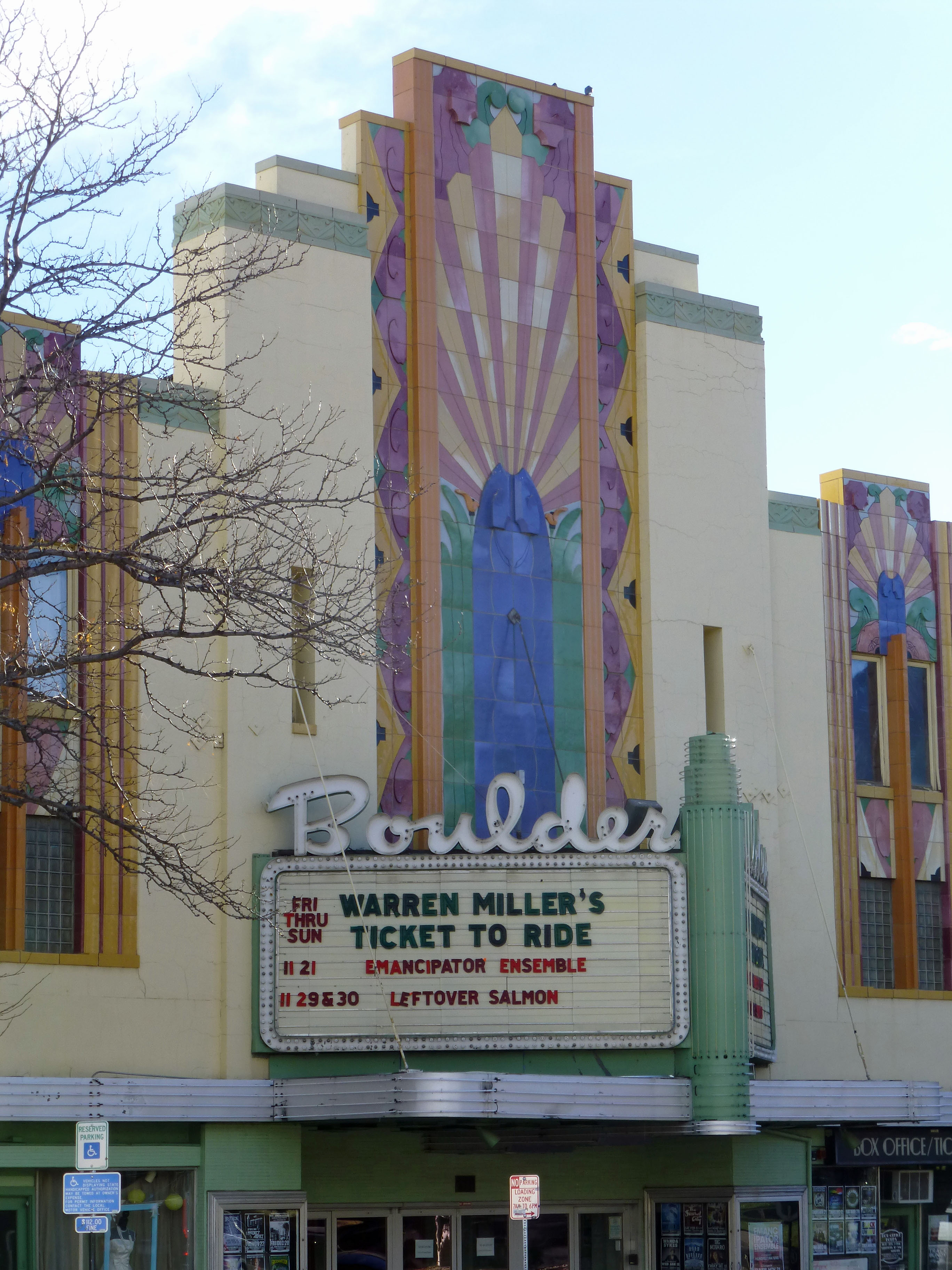
Boulder Theater

== Boulder ==
- Boulder County Courthouse, Boulder, 1933
- Boulder Theater, Boulder, 1906, 1935
- Boulder High School, Boulder, 1937
- Glen Huntington Band Shell, Boulder, 1938

== Colorado Springs ==
- Colorado Springs Fine Arts Center, Colorado Springs, 1936
- Colorado Springs School District 11 Administration Building, Colorado Springs
- General William J. Palmer High School, Colorado Springs, 1940
- Kimball's Peak Three Theater (former Peak Theater), Colorado Springs, 1935
- Morrison Brothers Market, Colorado Springs, 1936
- Municipal Utilities Building, Colorado Springs, 1931
- Peterson Air and Space Museum, Colorado Springs, 1942

== Denver ==
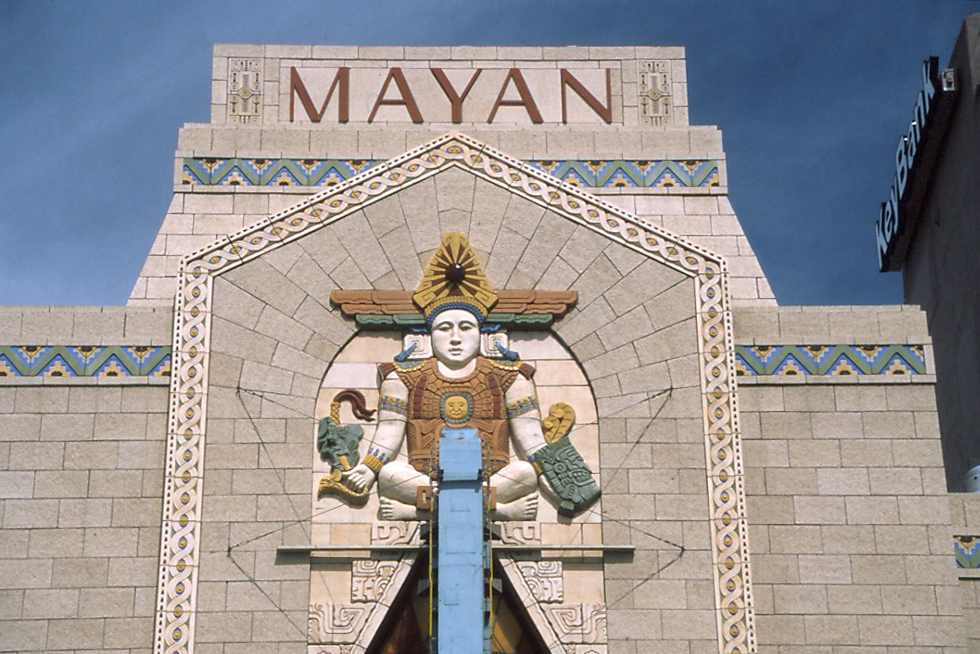
Mayan Theater, Denver

- 1575 Vine, Denver, 1947
- 2383 Jasmine Street, Denver, 1939
- A. B. Hirschfeld Press Building, Denver, 1949
- American Woodmen Life Building, Denver, 1950
- Bluebird Theater, Denver, 1914
- Bryant Webster Elementary School, Highland, Denver, 1931
- Buerger Brothers Building, Denver, 1929
- Colorado Coalition for the Homeless, Denver 1930s
- Colorado State Capitol Annex Building and Boiler Plant, Capitol Hill, Denver, 1939
- Denver Wastewater Management Building, Denver, 1993
- Detroit Terraces, Denver
- Dorset House, Denver, 1937
- The Elm, Denver, 1930s
- Emerson Apartments, Poet's Row, Denver, 1930s
- Emily Dickinson Building, Poet's Row, Denver, 1956
- Eugene Field Building, Poet's Row, Denver, 1939
- Fire Station No. 11, Denver, 1937
- Horace Mann Middle School, Denver 1931
- Hotel Monaco (former Albany Hotel), Denver, 1930s
- James Russell Lowell Building, Poet's Row, Denver, 1936
- Katherine Mullen Memorial Home for Nurses (now Mullen Building, Saint Joseph Hospital Foundation), Denver, 1936
- Leeman Auto Company Building, Denver, 1932
- Leetonia Apartments, Denver, 1930
- Louisa May Alcott Building, Poet's Row, Denver, 1931
- Marianne Apartments, Denver, 1930s
- Mark Twain Apartments, Poet's Row, Denver, 1937
- Mayan Theater, Denver, 1930
- Midwest Steel & Iron Works, Denver, 1930
- Mountain States Telephone Building, Denver, 1929
- Nathaniel Hawthorne Building, Poet's Row, Denver, 1938
- Nordlund House, Denver, 1939
- Oxford Hotel Cruise Room, Denver, 1891 and 1933
- Paramount Theatre, Denver, 1930
- Railway Exchange New Building, Denver, 1937
- Robert Browning Apartments, Poet's Row, Denver, 1937
- Robert Frost Building, Poet's Row, Denver, 1929
- Robert W. Steele Elementary School, Denver 1929
- Rose-Adell Apartments, 970 Pennsylvania, Denver, 1940
- Shangri-La, Denver, 1938
- Sherman Arms Building, Poet's Row, Denver, 1950
- Smiley's Laundromat, Denver, 1932
- Thomas Carlyle Building, Poet's Row, Denver, 1936
- University Building, Denver, 1929
- Washington Irving Apartments, Poet's Row, Denver, 1936

== Fort Collins ==
- Beebe Clinic Building, Fort Collins
- Fort Collins Municipal Power Plant Fountain, Fort Collins, 1936
- Northern Hotel, Fort Collins, 1936
- Student Services Building, Colorado State University, Fort Collins, 1948

== Fort Morgan ==
- Farmers State Bank Building, Fort Morgan, 1930
- Fort Morgan Fire Department, Fort Morgan
- Fort Morgan Power Plan, Fort Morgan, 1952
- Morgan County Courthouse and Jail, Fort Morgan, 1921 and 1936

== Lakewood ==
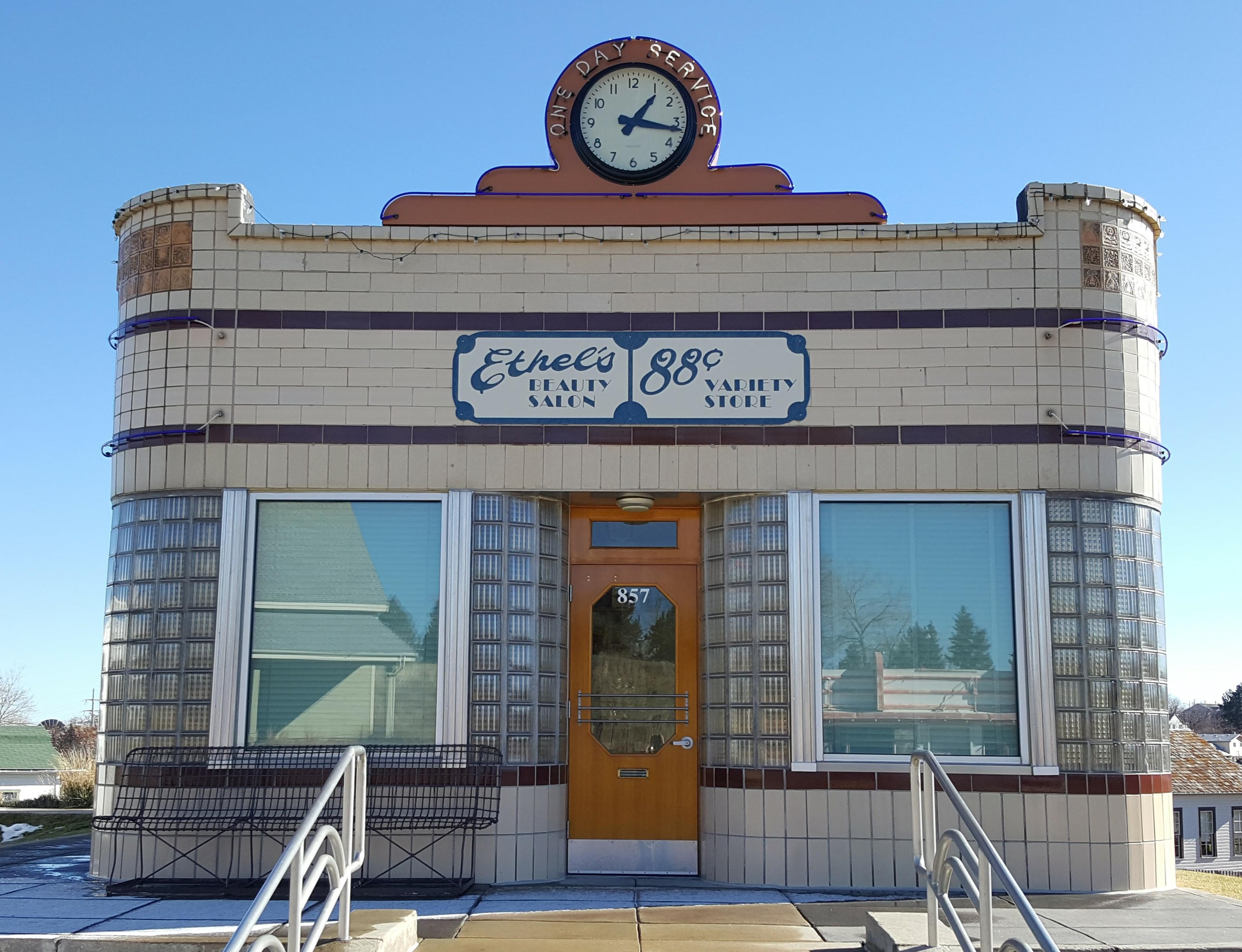
Ethel's Beauty Salon and Gil's Barber Shop, Lakewood

- Davies Chuck Wagon Diner, Lakewood, 1957
- Ethel's Beauty Salon and Gil's Barber Shop, Heritage Lakewood Belmar Park, Lakewood
- Jeffco Open High School, Lakewood
- Lakewood Theatre, Lakewood, 1948
- Peerless Gas Station, Heritage Lakewood Belmar Park, Lakewood
- Sno White Dry Cleaners, Lakewood, 1948
- Sobesky Academy, Lakewood

== Other cities ==
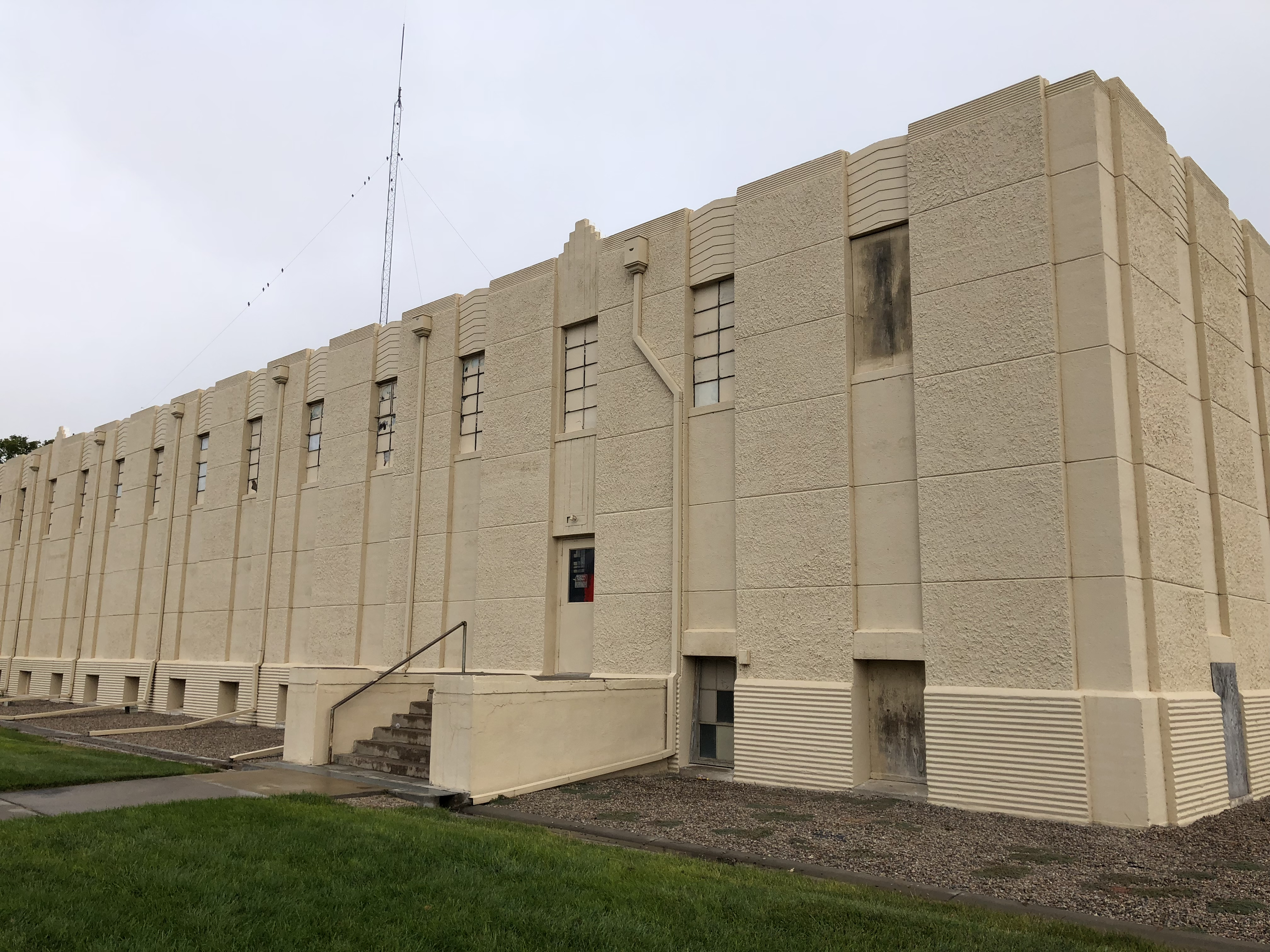
Burlington Gymnasium, Burlington.

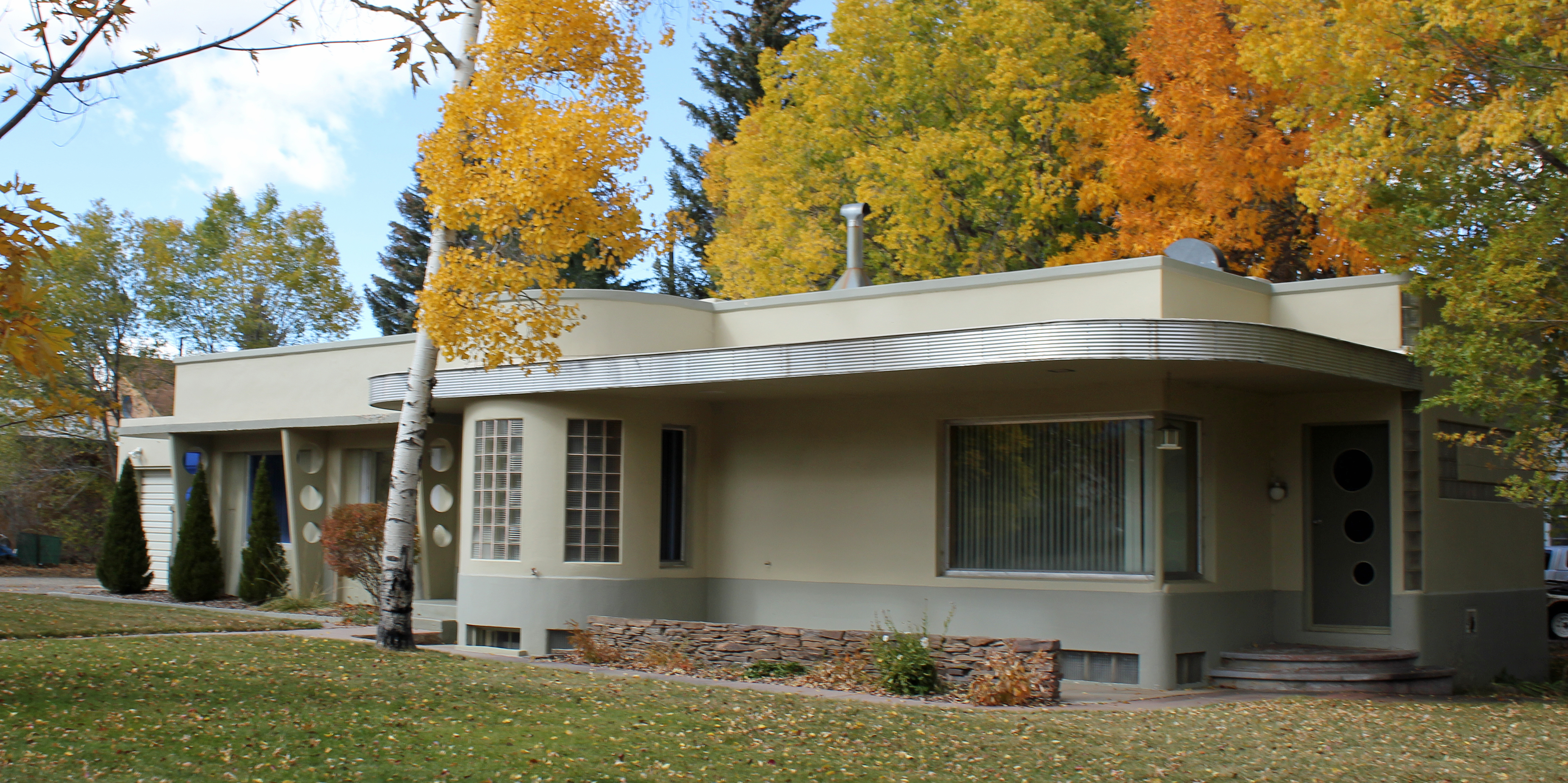
Streamline Moderne-style Heister House in Salida, Colorado.

- Benevolent and Protective Order of Elks Lodge, Montrose, 1927
- Burlington Gymnasium, Burlington, 1941
- Chaffee County Courthouse, Salida, 1931
- Chaka Theater, Julesburg, 1919
- Cliff Theater, Wray, 1950
- Custer County Courthouse, Westcliffe, 1929
- Del Norte Grade School, Del Norte, 1942
- Eagle County Courthouse, Eagle
- Egyptian Theatre, Delta, 1933
- Fruita Middle School, Fruita
- Gothic Theatre, Englewood, 1920s
- Greeley Junior High School, Greeley, 1938
- Haskin Medical Building, Center, 1940s
- Heister House, Salida, 1943
- Hugo Municipal Pool, Hugo, 1938
- Husung Hardware Building (now KENY TV), Alamosa, 1936
- Isis Theater, Victor, 1896, 1920s
- Kim Schools, Kim, 1934
- La Jara Elementary School, La Jara, 1930s
- Lakeside Amusement Park, Lakeside, 1930s
- Lamar Theater, Lamar, 1920
- Montrose City Hall, Montrose, 1926
- Municipal Building, Gunnison, 1931
- Phillips County Courthouse, Holyoke, 1935
- Rialto Theater, Loveland, 1920
- Revere High School, Ovid, 1928
- S. H. Kress and Co. Building, (now Business and Technology Center), Pueblo, 1930
- St. Agnes Catholic Church, Saguache, 1950
- Sedgwick County Courthouse, Julesburg, 1939
- Sim Hudson Motor Company Building, Burlington, 1932
- Trojan Theater, Longmont, 1939
- Union High School, Westminster, 1939
- United States Post Office, Florence, 1936
- Ute Theatre, Saguache, 1916

== See also ==
- Category:Art Deco architecture in Colorado
- List of Art Deco architecture
  - List of Art Deco architecture in the United States
- Bibliography of Colorado
- Geography of Colorado
- History of Colorado
- Index of Colorado-related articles
- List of Colorado-related lists
- Outline of Colorado
