= Phillips County Courthouse =

Phillips County Courthouse may refer to:

- Phillips County Courthouse (Arkansas), Helena–West Helena, Arkansas
- Phillips County Courthouse (Colorado), Holyoke, Colorado
- Phillips County Courthouse (Kansas), Phillipsburg, Kansas
