= Eugene G. Groves =

American architect

Eugene G. Groves (1883–1967) was an American architect of Denver, Colorado. He was responsible for the design of civic and educational facilities throughout Colorado over a career spanning five decades.

== Early life ==
Eugene Gregory Groves was born on February 9, 1883, at Dana, Indiana, to Martha (Trobridge) and Thomas Jefferson Groves. He attended school at the Y.M.C.A. in Indianapolis, Indiana. There was a Y.M.C.A. Night School with a commercial department in Indianapolis. He was awarded a scholarship to Harvard University and attended the school from 1909 to 1911. In 1918, he married Jessie B. Scott in New York City. They were divorced on April 18, 1931, in Jefferson County, Colorado.

== Career ==
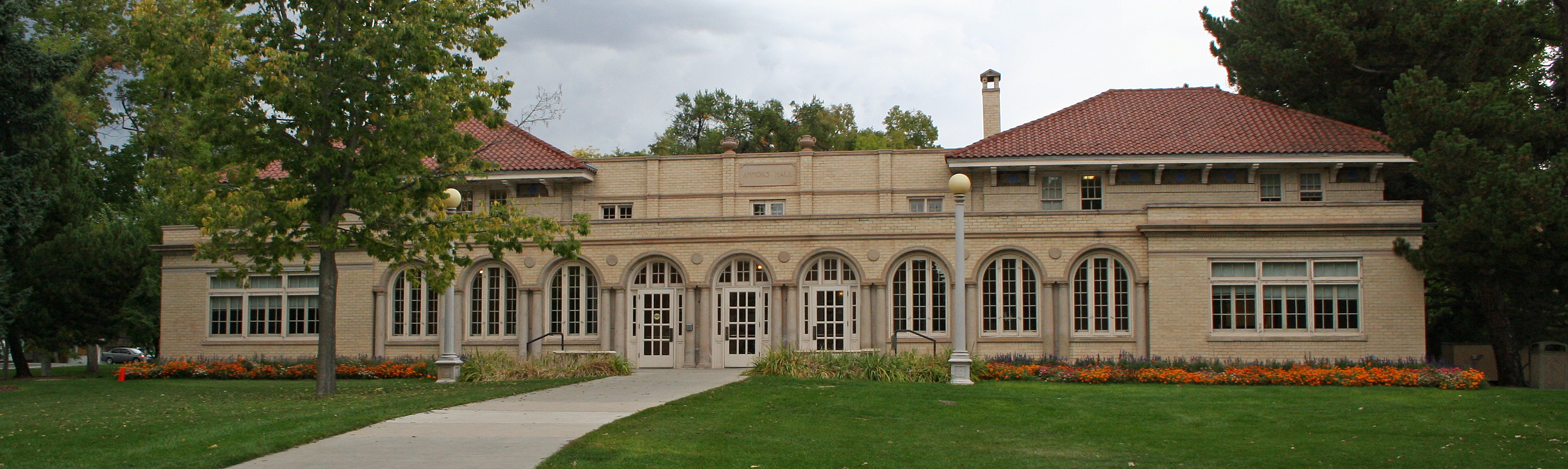
Ammons Hall, Colorado State University (CSU) in Fort Collins

He came to Denver in 1914 due to poor health. He designed numerous buildings and additions for Colorado State University (CSU) in Fort Collins from the 1920s through 1950. Many of his buildings are on the National Register of Historic Places and reflect his interest in a number of architectural styles. Ammons Hall (1922) on the CSU campus is Italian Renaissance Revival. The Cañon City Municipal Building (1927) is of Moderne-style architecture. Lowell School (1929) is a contributing building within North Seventh Street Historic Residential District in Grand Junction.

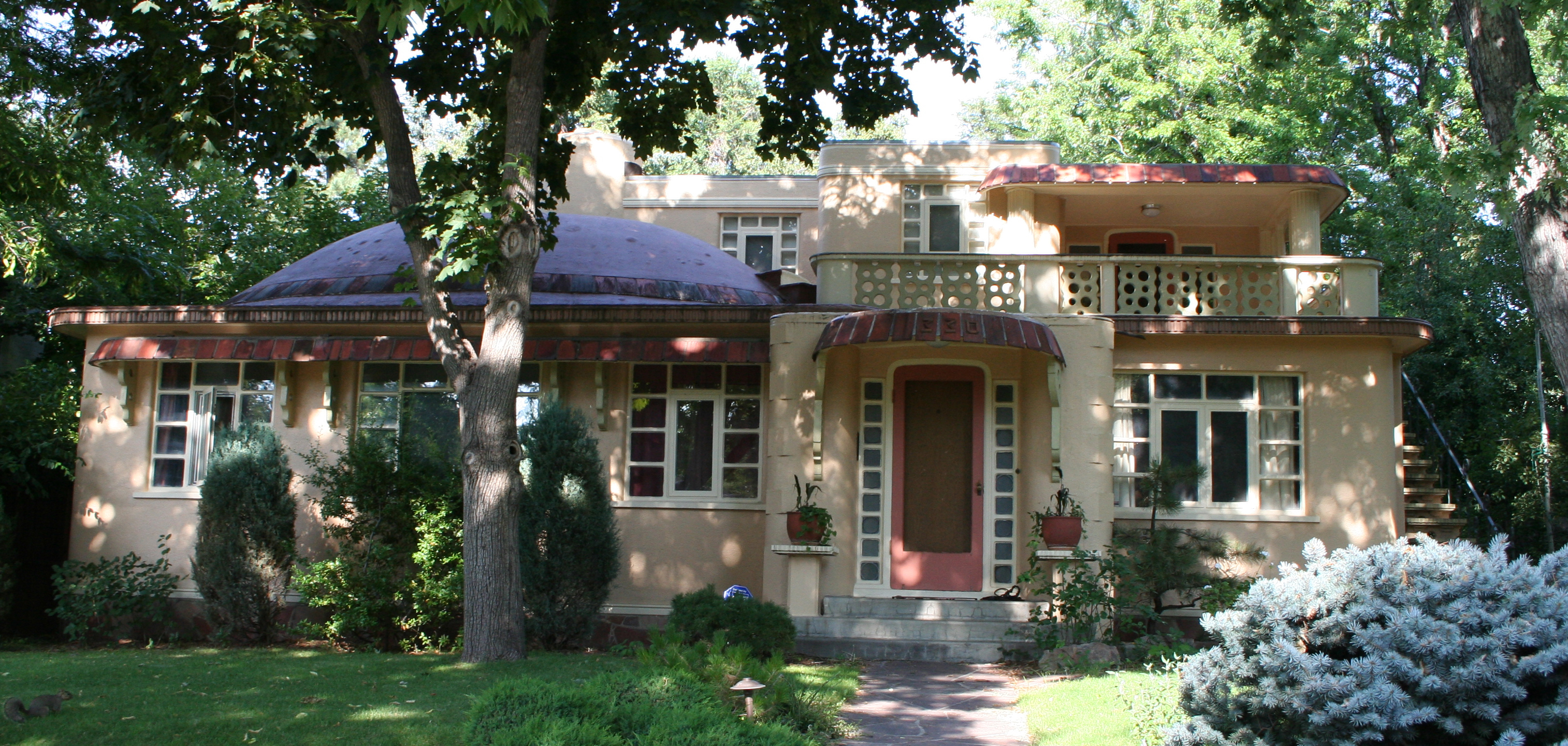
Nordlund House, Denver

Golden High School is an example of his expertise using poured, cast, and reinforced concrete. He patented his techniques for constructing buildings of concrete. It involved precast concrete studs and beams supporting concrete slab floors and concrete stucco over wire mesh walls. During the 1930s his company, Concreter Corporation, constructed several concrete houses with his technique. Nordlund House in Denver, where he had breakfast nook seats and kitchen cabinets and counters made of concrete. Johnson's Corner gas station in Longmont is another example of his concrete construction.

During the Great Depression, federal relief programs allowed him the opportunity to design school, county courthouse, and college buildings under the Works Progress Administration and Public Works Administration projects.

== Works ==
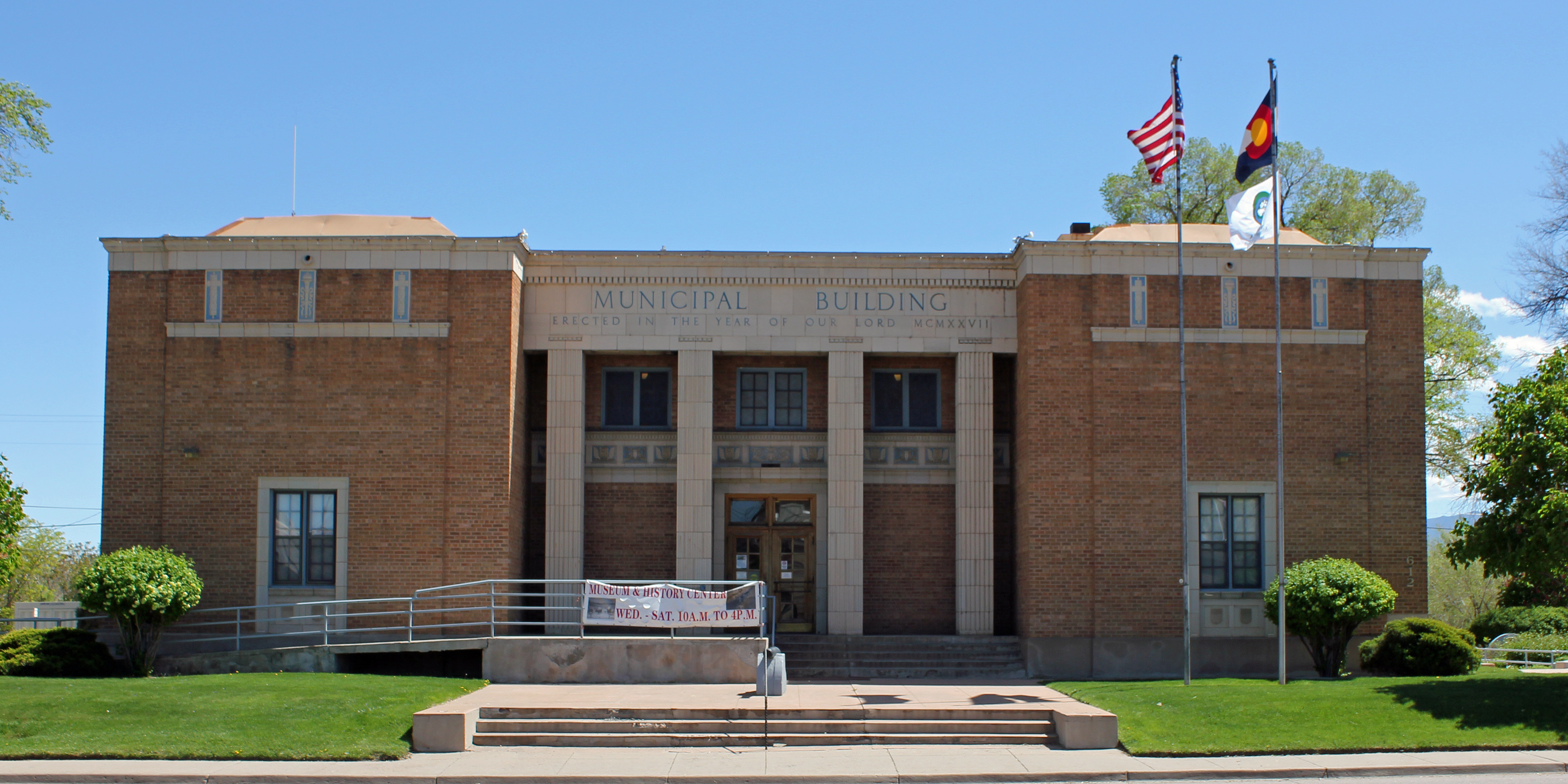
Cañon City Municipal Building, Cañon City, Colorado

A number of his works are listed on the National Register of Historic Places (NRHP).

- Cañon City Municipal Building (1927), 612 Royal Gorge Blvd., Cañon City, Colorado, NRHP-listed
- Education Building (1929) of the First Christian Church, 101 N. Tenth St., Columbia, Missouri, NRHP-listed
- Phillips County Courthouse (1935), 221 Interocean Ave., Holyoke, Colorado, NRHP-listed
- Akron Gymnasium (1938–1940), W. 4th St. & Custer Ave., Akron, Colorado, NRHP-listed
- Ammons Hall, Colorado State University campus, Fort Collins, Colorado, NRHP-listed
- Farmers State Bank Building (1930), 300 Main St., Fort Morgan, Colorado, NRHP-listed
- Golden High School, 710 10th St., Golden, Colorado, NRHP-listed
- I and M Building, 223 Main St., Sterling, Colorado, NRHP-listed
- Morgan County Courthouse and Jail, 225 Ensign and 218 West Kiowa, Fort Morgan, Colorado, NRHP-listed
- Nordlund House, 330 Birch St., Denver, Colorado, NRHP-listed
- Pine Bluffs High School, jct. of 7th and Elm Sts., Pine Bluffs, Wyoming, NRHP-listed
- One or more works in North Seventh Street Historic Residential District, 7th St. between Hill and White Aves., Grand Junction, Colorado, NRHP-listed
