= Golden High School =

Public high school in Golden, Colorado, U.S.

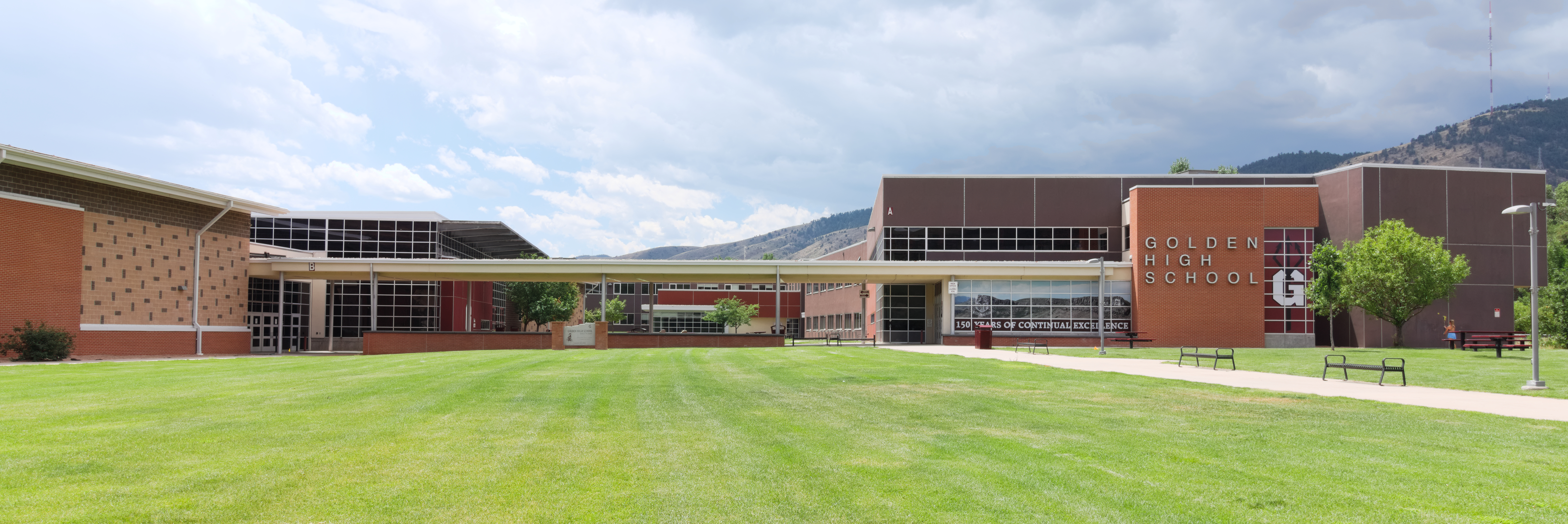

Location
- 701 24th Street; Golden, Colorado 80401; United States; 39°44′36″N 105°12′41″W

Information
- Type: Public secondary
- Established: 1873 (153 years ago)
- School district: Jefferson County Public Schools
- CEEB code: 060670
- Principal: John Graham
- Teaching staff: 68.25 (FTE)
- Grades: 9 to 12
- Student to teacher ratio: 21.29
- Colors: Maroon and white
- Fight song: Golden Demons' Fight Song
- Mascot: Demons
- Rival: Wheat Ridge High School
- Website: golden.jeffcopublicschools.org
- Golden High School
- U.S. National Register of Historic Places
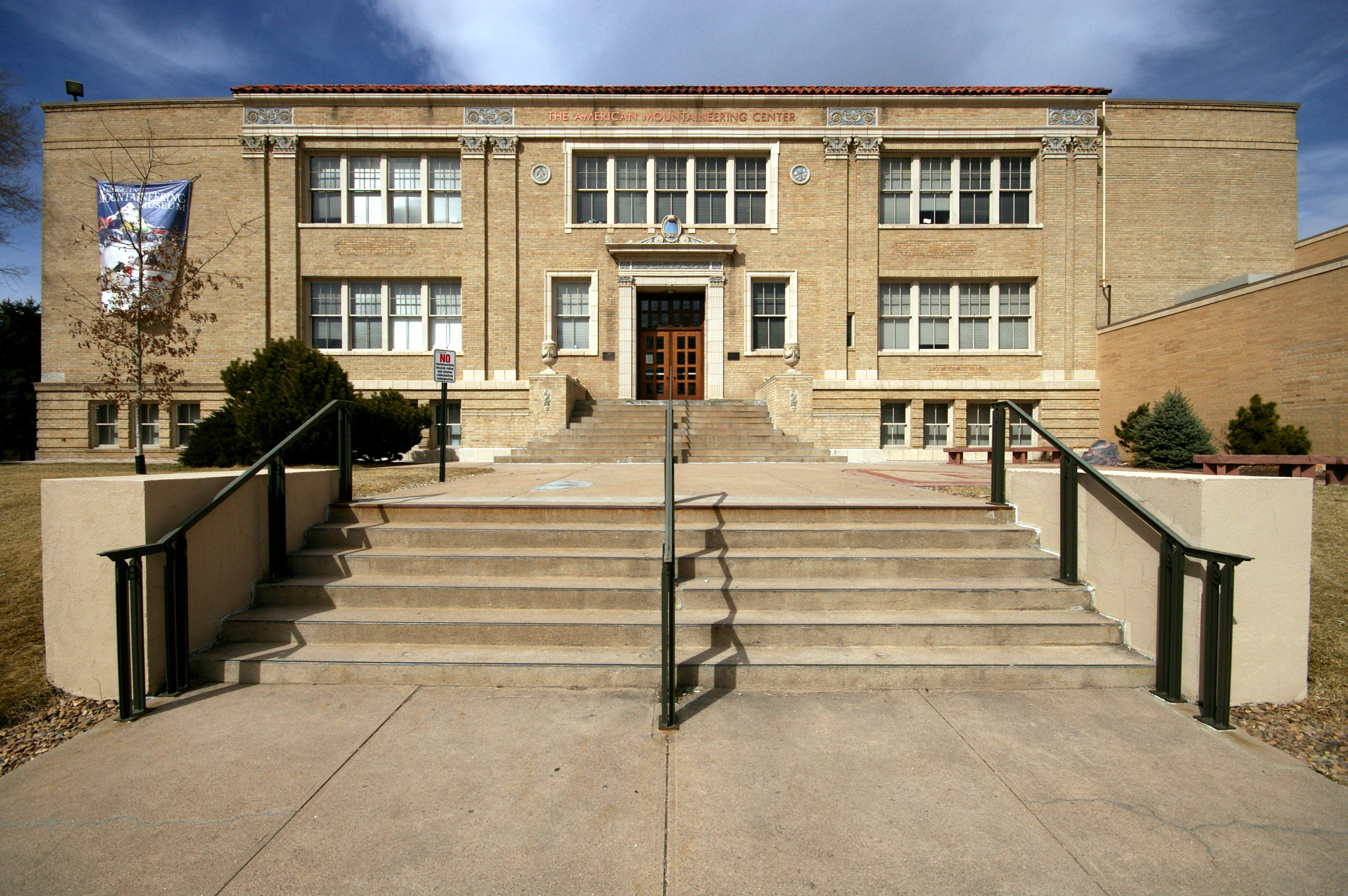
- Old Golden High School

- Location within Colorado Location within the United States
- Location: 710 10th Street, Golden, Colorado
- Coordinates: 39°45′30″N 105°13′23″W
- Area: less than one acre
- Built: 1924
- Built by: Buckman and Axtell
- Architect: Eugene G. Groves
- Architectural style: Beaux-Arts
- NRHP reference No.: 97000229
- Added to NRHP: March 14, 1997

Golden High School is a secondary school located in Golden, the county seat of Jefferson County, Colorado, United States. It is part of the Jefferson County Public Schools district.

== History ==
=== Background ===
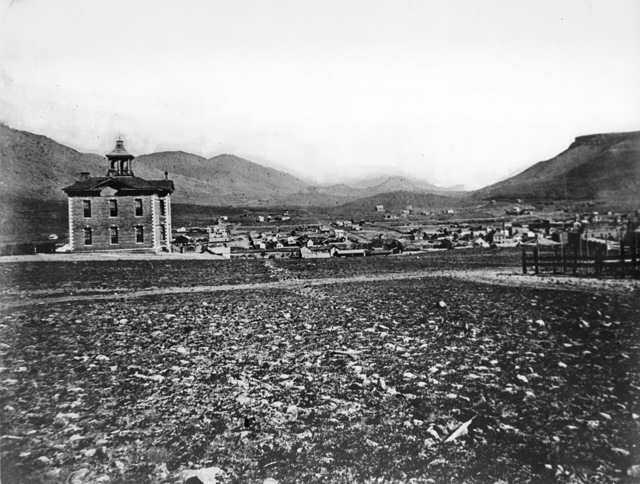
The South School, Golden, Colorado, when it originally served all of Golden School District #1. Photo taken around 1874.

South School was established in 1873 for primary, intermediate, and grammar education. It began offering high school education in 1873, the first school of its kinds in the state, and had a graduating class by 1889. In 1892, the high school was located within the walls of South School. It offered a theater program, a now long-standing tradition, by 1895 when it produced Charley's Aunt. The North School building was constructed in 1880 due to the increased population in the area.

=== Golden High School (1924–1956) ===
The Golden High School was completed in 1924, consolidating high school education previously provided by the North and South Schools. The school was designed by Eugene G. Groves and built by Buckman and Axtell. Modern for its time, the Beaux-Arts style building had a convenient layout and fireproof construction. The building housed a library, study hall, inset lockers, and a balcony in the gymnasium. It served as a high school until 1956, when a new high school was built. The building then became the Golden Junior High School. An addition was added in 1965 that maintained the historic view of the building along Washington Avenue. It operated as a junior high school until May 1988, when it was declared a surplus by the Jefferson County Public Schools. It was acquired by the Colorado Mountain Club and American Alpine Club in 1993 to serve as their headquarters. The former school building was listed on the National Register of Historic Places on March 14, 1997.

=== Golden High School (1956–2008) ===
A high school building was constructed in 1956 at the corner of 24th and Jackson streets. It was a combination of buildings that fell into disrepair. When the new high school building was constructed in 2008, the site was made into a parking lot for the new high school.

=== Golden High School (2008-Present) ===
External images
- Golden High School image, 1964 yearbook
- Front of Golden High School, built in 2008
- One of the Golden High School buildings and the mountains

A new school building was completed in August 2008. The 188,000-square-foot campus was built for $33 million. There are two separate buildings. One has 60 classrooms and labs and a library, the other hold the cafeteria, gym, an auditorium and a shop classroom.

== Attendance zone ==
The attendance zone of the school includes, besides Golden: West Pleasant View

== Education ==
Golden High School is a public high school, teaching grades nine through twelve. It is accredited by the Colorado Department of Education and is rated as a performance school. The school calendar is based upon two 18-week semesters. Golden High School offers a comprehensive curriculum, including college prep classes, engineering, culinary, woodworking, metalworking, and a variety of classes in fine and performance arts. It offers AP and honor courses, as well as a few courses that earn transferable college credit. Students generally take six classes at a time, but could take seven classes a semester. The student enrollment for the 2015–2016 school year was approximately 1,250 students.

== Special programs ==
Special programs include:

- GHS offers a unique Senior Seminar program to seniors second semester. Students are selected through a competitive application process to spend the semester in an experiential learning environment.
- Each Spring GHS offers juniors the chance to participate in Junior Rafting Trips.
- GHS is the coordinating school for an annual Summer Field Biology trip to Hawaii.
- Spanish students have the opportunity to study in Spain each summer at the University of Salamanca.

== Performance Groups ==
Stage Right Productions is Golden's student theater group. They perform full plays, one-act plays, and musicals every semester. They are registered as Troupe 2681 within the International Thespian Society and have been a thespian troupe since the 1970s. 2023 will be their 50th year as an organization.

The Screamin' Demons Improv Team is Golden's official improvisational comedy group. They rehearse and perform under the umbrella of Stage Right Productions.

== Traditions ==
=== The Hand Jive ===
The "Hand Jive" is a choreographed dance that Golden students and faculty perform during assemblies and sports games. The Hand Jive is performed along with the song Just Can't Get Enough by Depeche Mode. The tradition started around the time the song was released in 1981.

== Golden High Alumni Foundation ==
The Golden High Alumni Foundation provides grants and scholarships to Golden High School students. While attending high school, students can apply for grants for educational camps, conferences, trade and vocational programs, sports programs, trips, and other programs. The foundation also offers scholarships to Colorado-based colleges or trade schools.

== Notable alumni ==
- Greg Germann, actor, notable for his appearances on Grey's Anatomy and Talladega Nights: The Ballad of Ricky Bobby.
- Roy Hartzell, baseball player for St. Louis Browns and New York Highlanders/Yankees
- Lindsey Horan, midfielder for the United States women's national soccer team, Olympic gold medalist and World Cup Champion
- Albert "Cowboy" Jones, baseball pitcher for Cleveland Spiders and St. Louis Perfectos/Cardinals
- Annie McEnroe, actress, notable for her appearance in Beetlejuice (1988).
- Mark Melancon, Major League Baseball pitcher for the San Diego Padres
- Yul Moldauer, American gymnast, Olympian, and 2017 U.S. national all-around champion
- Tyler Pennel, runner
- Bill Phillips, fitness and nutrition author; entrepreneur; former CEO of Experimental and Applied Sciences (EAS)
- Jarret "J.J." Thomas, 2002 Olympic bronze medalist, men's halfpipe
- John Charles Vivian, former Governor of Colorado

== See also ==
- National Register of Historic Places listings in Jefferson County, Colorado
