= Pine Bluffs High School =

- U.S. National Register of Historic Places
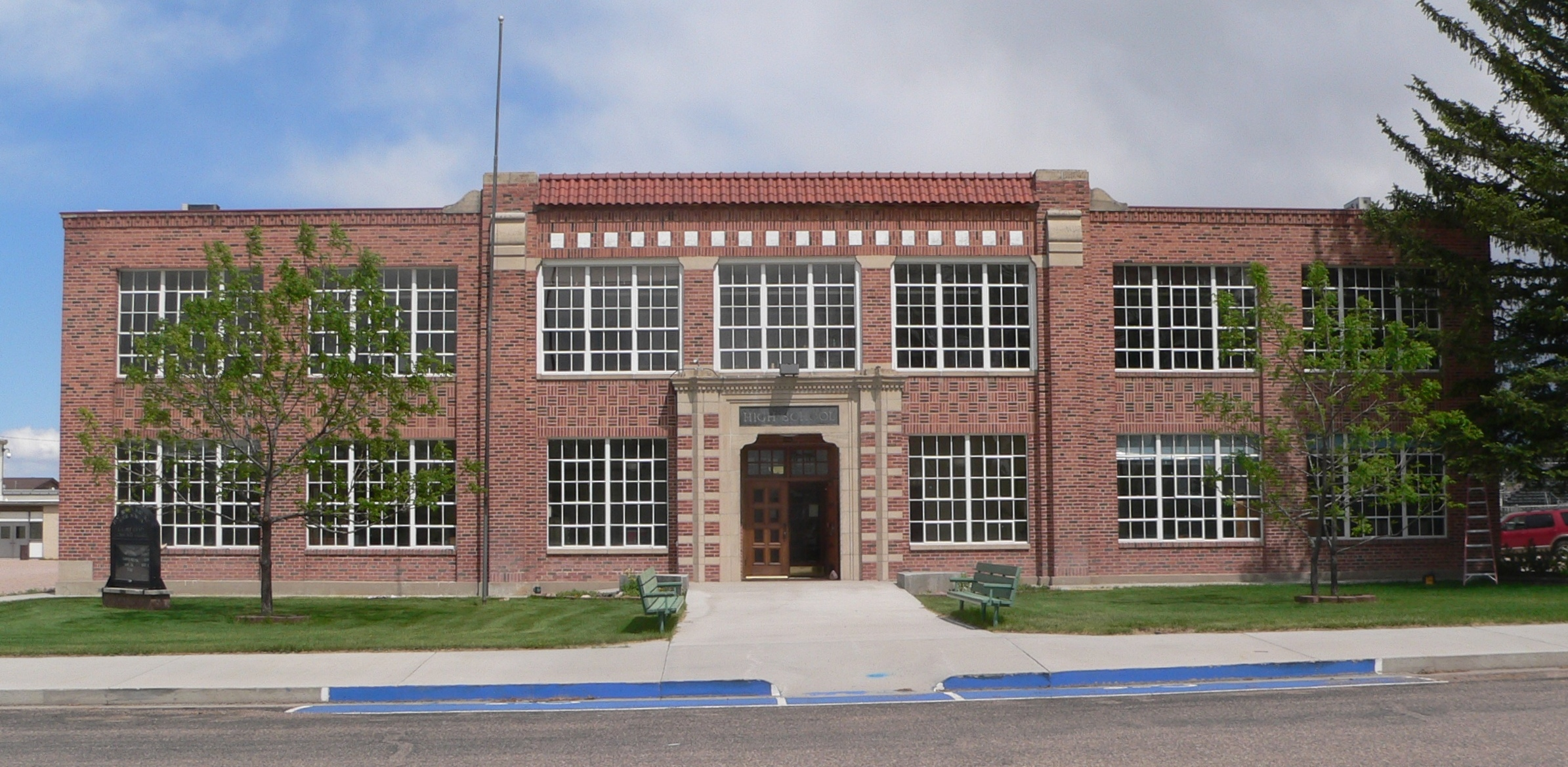

- Location within Wyoming
- Location: Jct. of 7th and Elm Sts., Pine Bluffs, Wyoming
- Coordinates: 41°10′42″N 104°03′59″W
- Area: less than one acre
- Built: 1929
- Built by: C.H. Young and Sons
- Architect: Groves, Eugene G.
- Architectural style: Classical Revival
- NRHP reference No.: 96000228
- Added to NRHP: March 21, 1996

The Pine Bluffs High School, at the junction of 7th and Elm Sts. in Pine Bluffs, Wyoming, was built in 1929. It was listed on the National Register of Historic Places in 1996.

It was designed by architect Eugene G. Groves and was built by contractor C.H. Young and Sons.

It is Classical Revival in style. It has a domed gymnasium-auditorium.
