= Cañon City Municipal Building =

- Canon City Municipal Building
- U.S. National Register of Historic Places
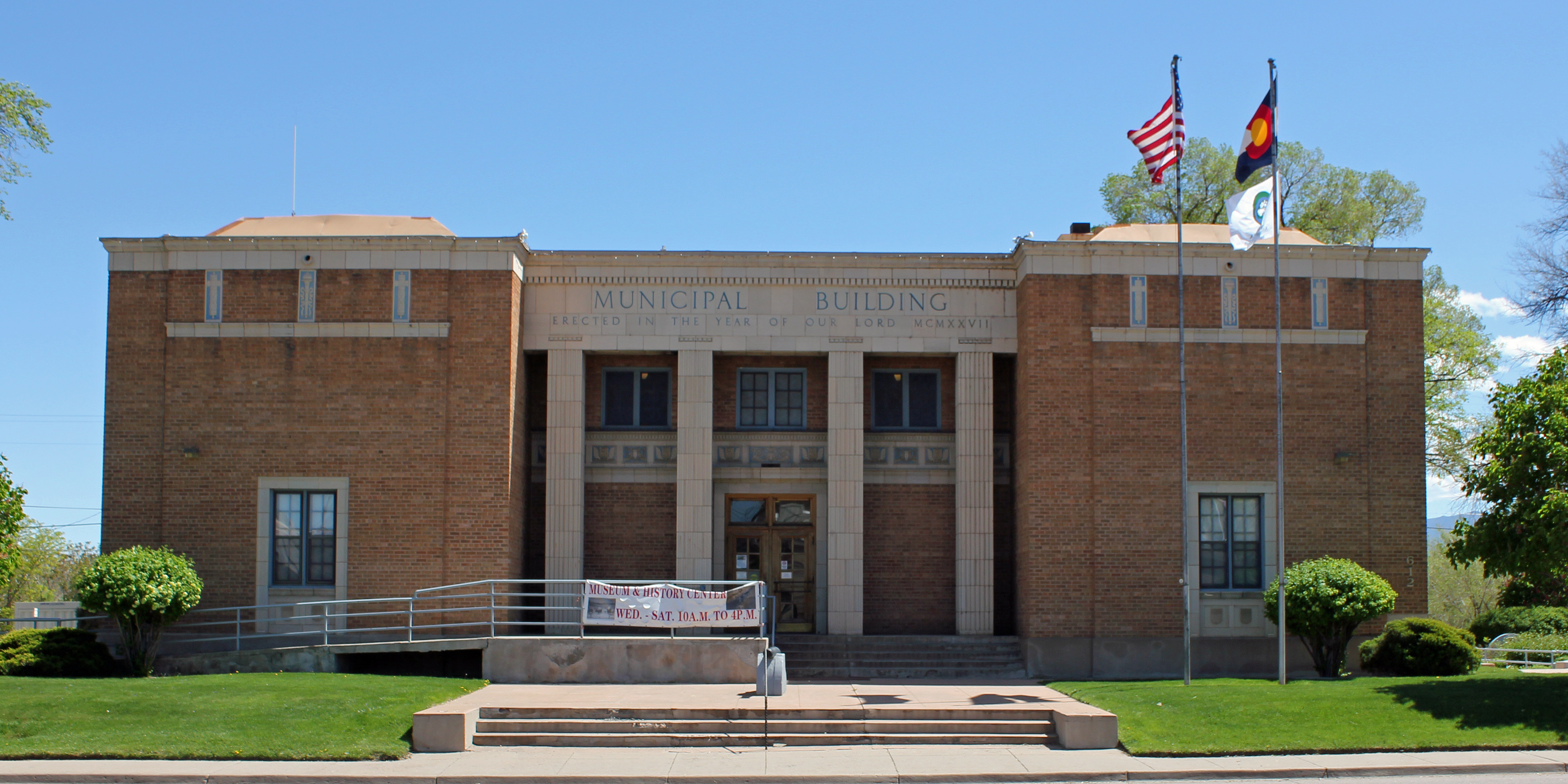

- Location within Colorado
- Location: 612 Royal Gorge Blvd., Canon City, Colorado
- Coordinates: 38°26′25″N 105°14′18″W
- Area: 1.2 acres (0.49 ha)
- Built: 1927
- Architect: Eugene Groves
- Architectural style: Moderne
- NRHP reference No.: 83001318
- Added to NRHP: August 18, 1983

The Cañon City Municipal Building was built in 1927. It was listed on the National Register of Historic Places in 1983.

It is a two-story brick Moderne-style building with an H-shaped plan, designed by architect Eugene Groves.

It is the current home of the Royal Gorge Regional Museum and History Center. It was originally built as a government building for the city of Cañon City, Colorado. A new City Hall building was built to allow more room for city offices and a larger city council meeting room leaving the vacated space available to an expansion of the museum and the relocation of the History Center from the Cañon City Public Library's basement to the Municipal Building. It was then decided to rename the building the Royal Gorge Regional Museum and History Center.

The building has three floors and includes a bomb shelter in its basement. A couple of historical structures are located directly south of the building, including the Rudd family homestead.
