= Akron Gymnasium =

- U.S. National Register of Historic Places
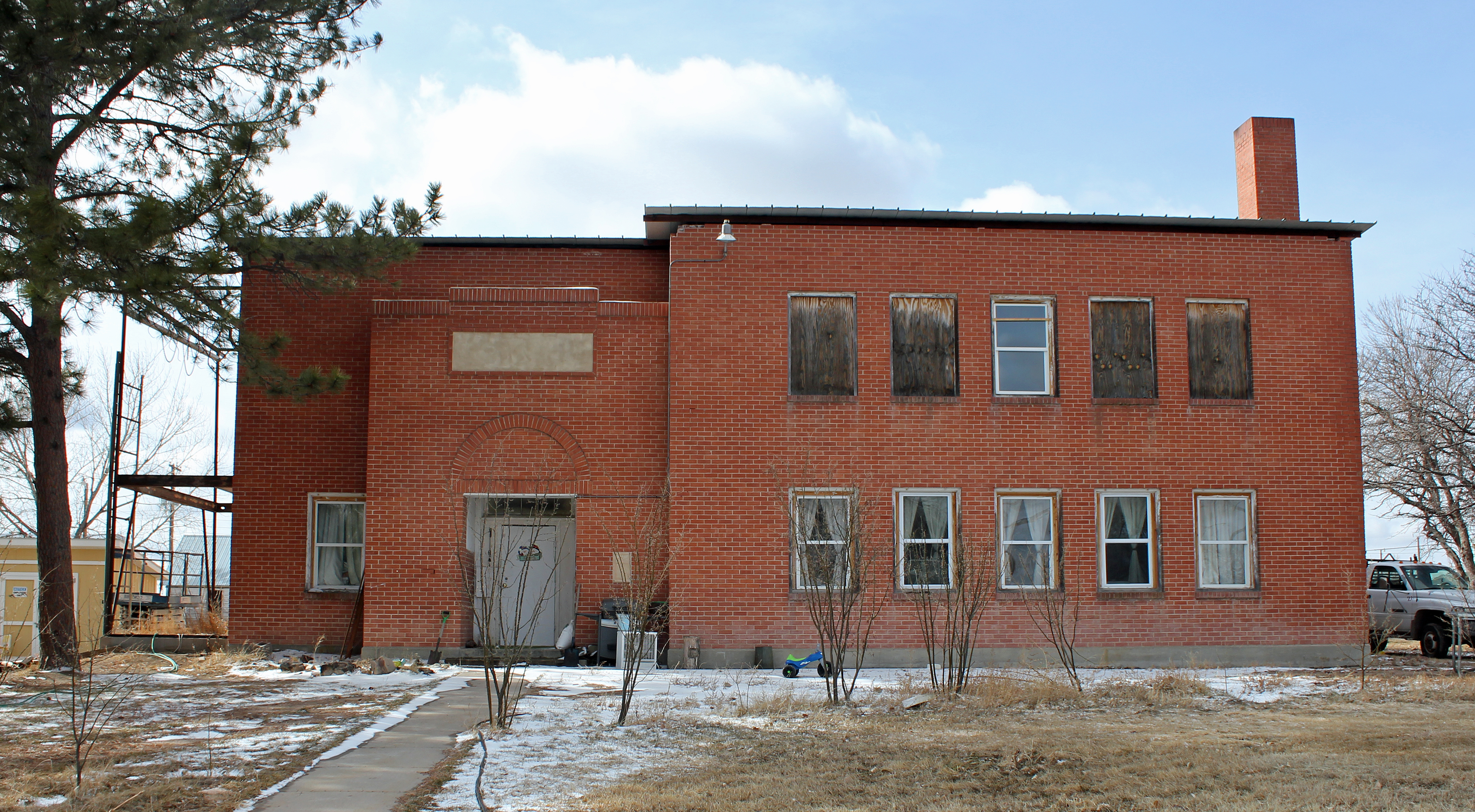
- Building in February, 2013

- Location within Colorado Location within the United States
- Location: W. 4th St. & Custer Ave., Akron, Colorado
- Coordinates: 40°9′43″N 103°13′2″W
- Area: less than one acre
- Built: 1938-40
- Built by: Works Progress Administration
- Architect: Groves, Eugene
- Architectural style: Late 19th and Early 20th Century American Movements, WPA Modernist
- MPS: New Deal Resources on Colorado's Eastern Plains MPS
- NRHP reference No.: 07001397
- Added to NRHP: January 16, 2008

The Akron Gymnasium, at W. 4th St. & Custer Ave. in Akron, Colorado, was built during 1938–40. It was designed by Eugene G. Groves and built by the Works Progress Administration. It has also been known as the Washington County High School Gymnasium. It was listed on the National Register of Historic Places in 2008.

It was abandoned for many years, but was deemed significant for its association with the WPA and with the community of Akron, a small town of 1,400 population in 1940.
