= First Christian Church (Columbia, Missouri) =

Historic church in Missouri, United States

- U.S. National Register of Historic Places
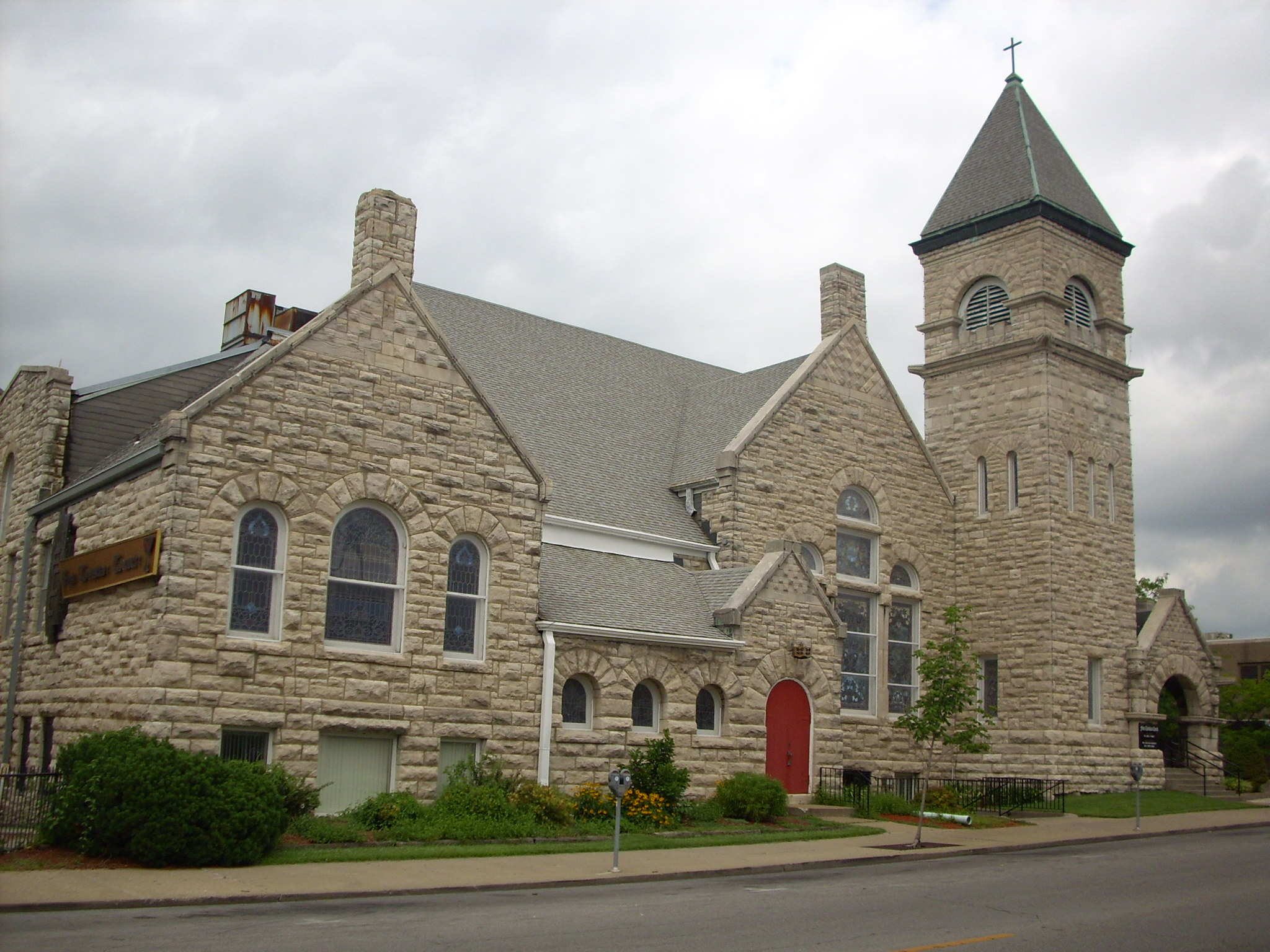

- Location within Missouri Location within the United States
- Location: 101 N. Tenth St.m Columbia, Missouri
- Coordinates: 38°57′10″N 92°19′36″W
- Area: less than one acre
- Built: 1893, 1929
- Architect: T.N. Bell (church); Eugene Groves (education building)
- Architectural style: Classical Revival, Romanesque, Richardsonian Romanesque
- NRHP reference No.: 91001590
- Added to NRHP: October 29, 1991

The First Christian Church is a historic Disciples of Christ church located at 101 North Tenth Street in Columbia, Missouri. It was designed by T.N. Bell of Chicago, Illinois and built in 1893. It has a Richardsonian Romanesque style Sanctuary that includes a square bell tower, horizontal massing with contrasting high gables, round arches, heavy and highly textured stone work, and voussoir arches. The Education Building was designed by Eugene Groves and added in 1929. This is the second church building to stand at this site. The building is still a functioning church today.

It was added to the National Register of Historic Places in 1991. It is located in the North Village Arts District.

== Bibliography ==
- Dains, Mary K. (1996). Guided by the Hand of God: The History of First Christian Church Columbia, MIssouri 1832-1996. Columbia, Missouri: First Christian Church.
