= Hugo Municipal Pool =

- U.S. National Register of Historic Places
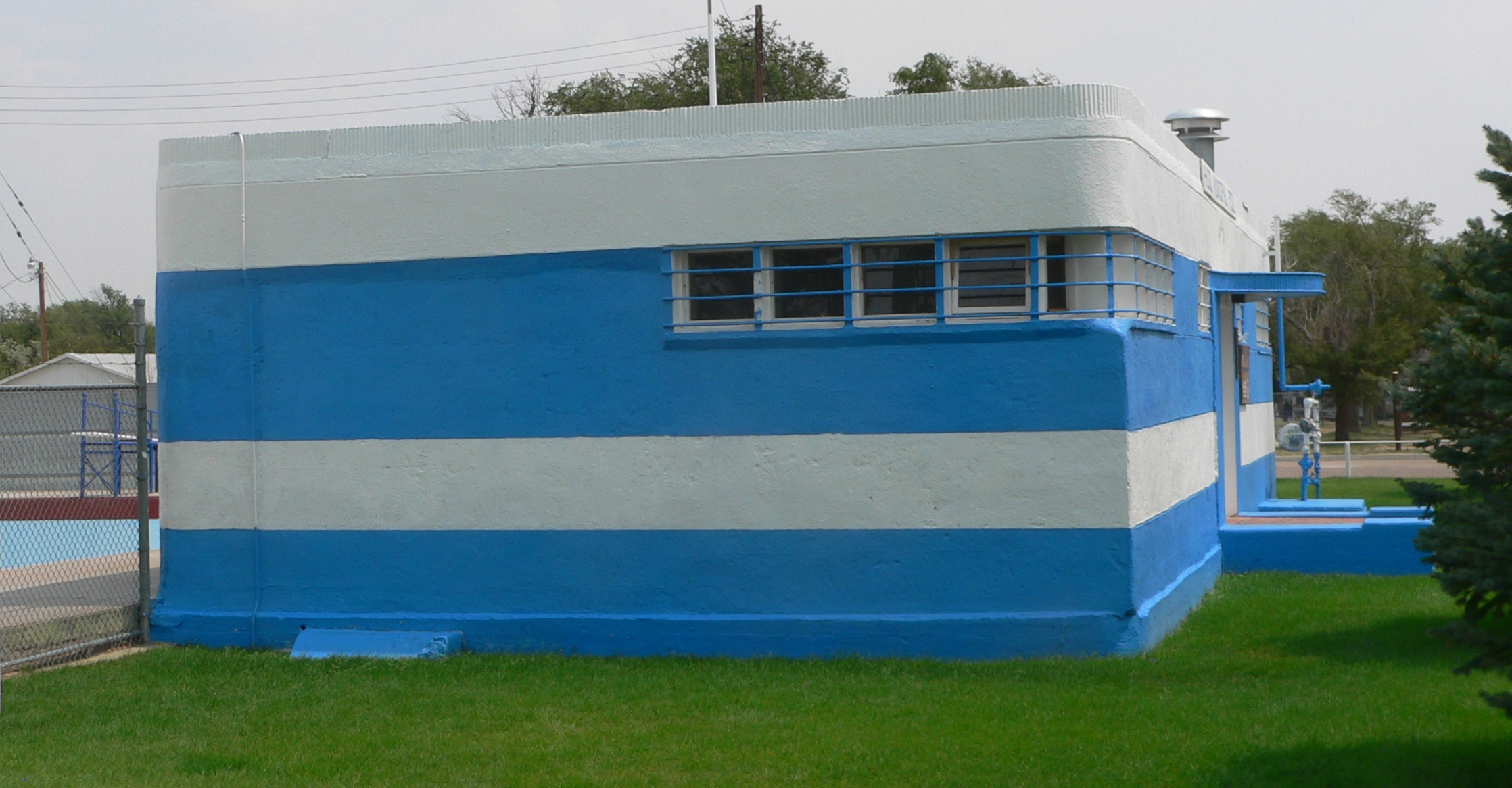

- Location within Colorado Location within the United States
- Location: Jct. of US 287 and 6th Ave., Hugo, Colorado
- Coordinates: 39°8′1″N 103°27′55″W
- Area: less than one acre
- Built: 1936-38
- Built by: Works Progress Administration
- Architect: Heggenberger, Lloyd E.
- Architectural style: WPA Moderne
- MPS: New Deal Resources on Colorado's Eastern Plains MPS
- NRHP reference No.: 08000692
- Added to NRHP: July 24, 2008

The Hugo Municipal Pool, in Hugo, Colorado, was built during 1936–38. It is located at the junction of US 287 and 6th Ave. Its building was designed by Lloyd E. Heggenberger and built by the Works Progress Administration in what has come to be known as WPA Moderne style. It was listed on the National Register of Historic Places in 2008.

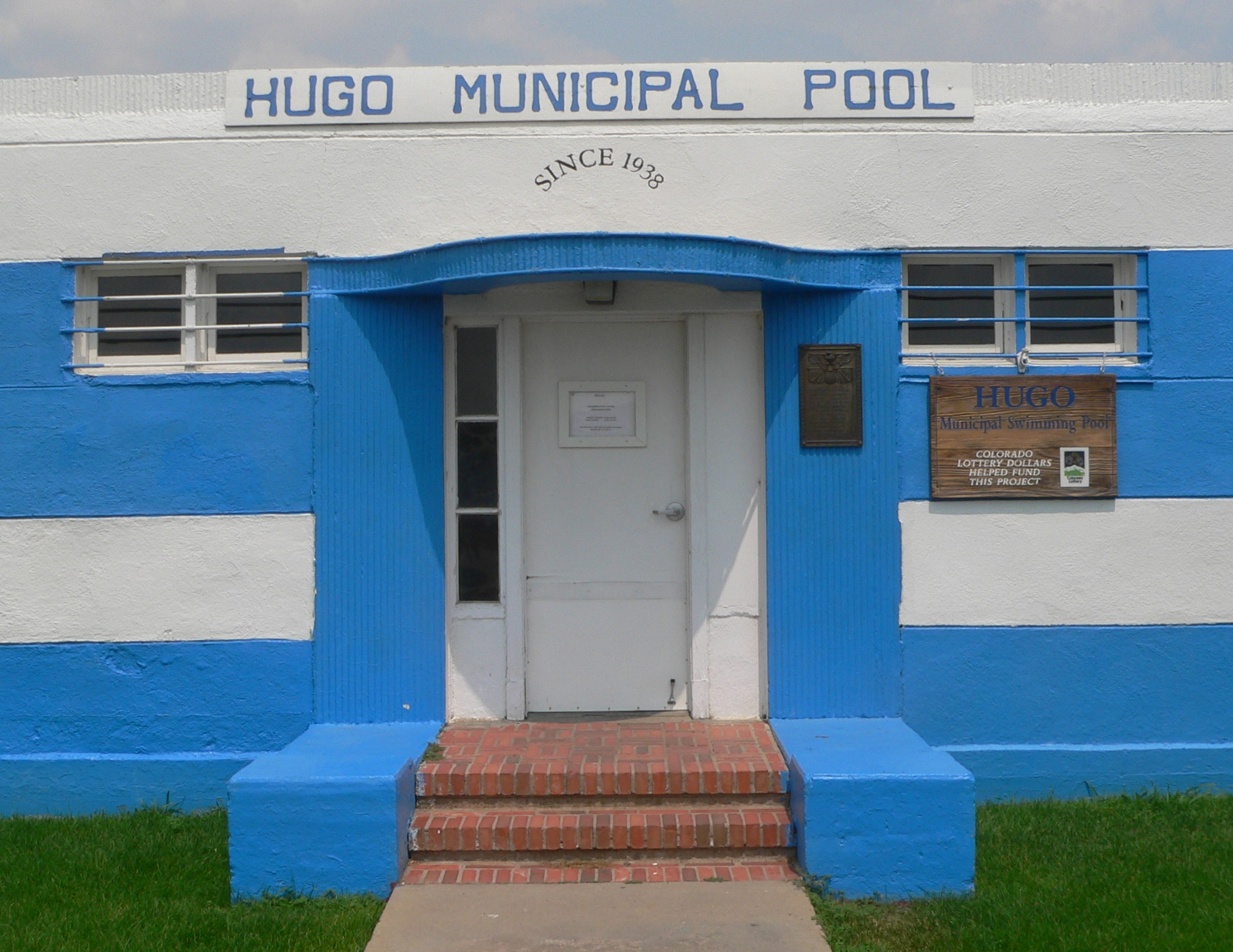
Hugo Municipal Pool entrance

Heggenberger also designed the Burlington Gymnasium, at 450 11th St. in Burlington, Colorado, which is also NRHP-listed.
