= Heister House =

Historic house in Colorado, United States

- U.S. National Register of Historic Places
- Colorado State Register of Historic Properties
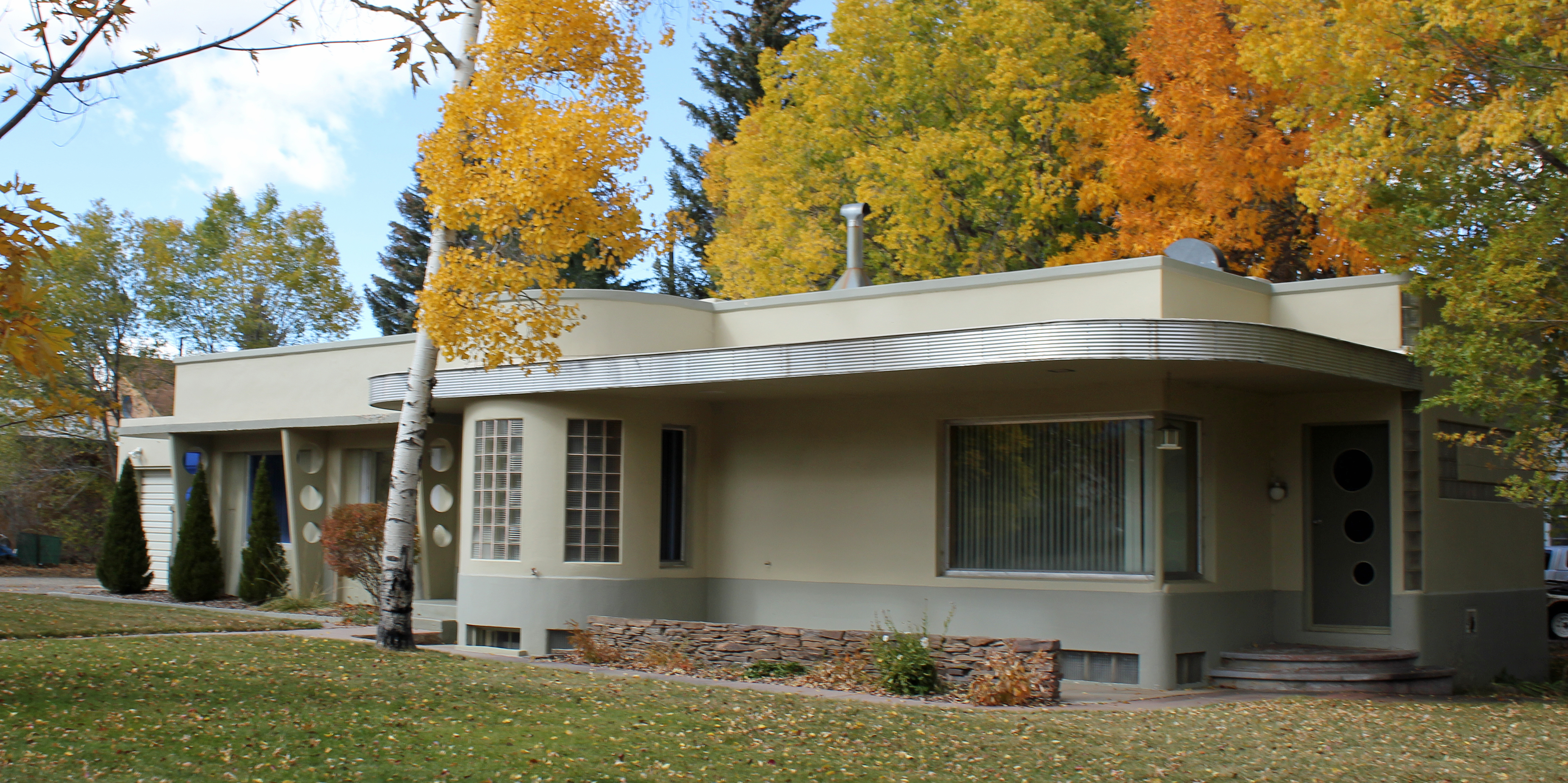
- The house in fall, 2011.

- Location within Colorado Location within the United States
- Location: 102 Poncha Blvd., Salida, Colorado
- Coordinates: 38°32′12″N 105°59′57″W
- Area: less than 1 acre
- Built: 1943
- Architect: Elwood and Frances Heister
- Architectural style: Moderne
- NRHP reference No.: 08000965
- CSRHP No.: 5CF.2366
- Added to NRHP: October 8, 2008

Heister House is a Moderne (Art Deco) house built in 1943 in Salida, Colorado. The building was listed on the National Register of Historic Places on October 8, 2008.

It is the 15th property listed as a featured property of the week in a program of the National Park Service that began in July, 2008.

== See also ==
- National Register of Historic Places listings in Chaffee County, Colorado
