= Burlington Gymnasium =

- U.S. National Register of Historic Places
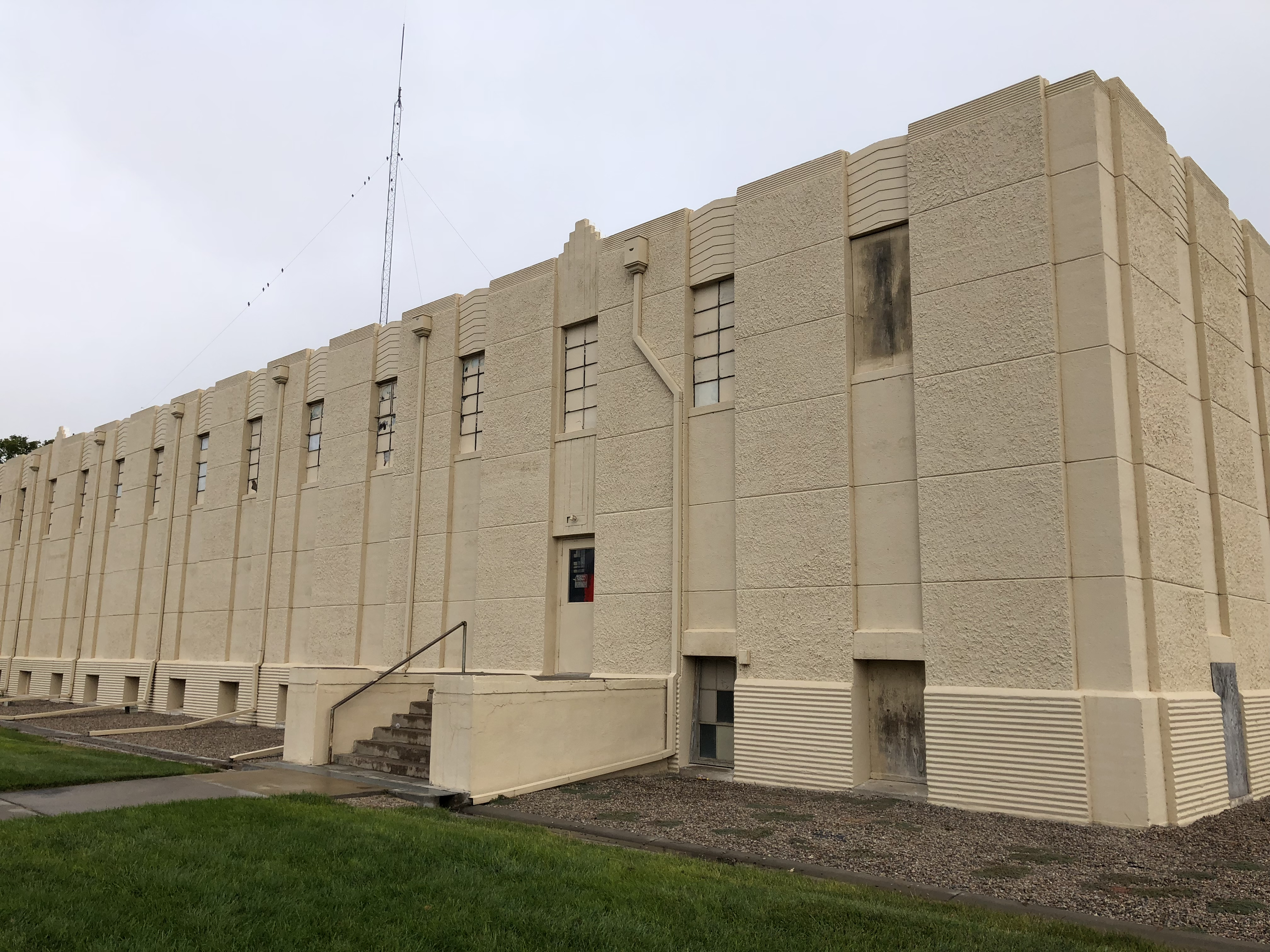
- Location: 450 11th St., Burlington, Colorado
- Coordinates: 39°18′17″N 102°15′46″W
- Area: less than one acre
- Built: 1938–41
- Built by: Lloyd E. Heggenberger; WPA
- Architectural style: Modern Movement, Art Deco
- MPS: New Deal Resources on Colorado's Eastern Plains MPS
- NRHP reference No.: 07001249
- Added to NRHP: December 11, 2007

The Burlington Gymnasium, in Burlington, Colorado, was built during 1938–1941 as a New Deal works project. It was listed on the National Register of Historic Places in 2007.

It is a two-story 137 by 70 feet (42 m × 21 m) building, with a balcony level over its open gymnasium space. Its curtain walls and partition walls were built of concrete blocks made by the Works Progress Administration, except for some basement partition walls where adobe blocks were used.

There were problems during its construction including that the original installation of floor joists was deemed to be unsafe for longterm usage, which caused delay in completion.

== See also ==
- Hugo Municipal Pool: designed by same architect
- National Register of Historic Places listings in Kit Carson County, Colorado
