= Cliff Theater =

- U.S. National Register of Historic Places
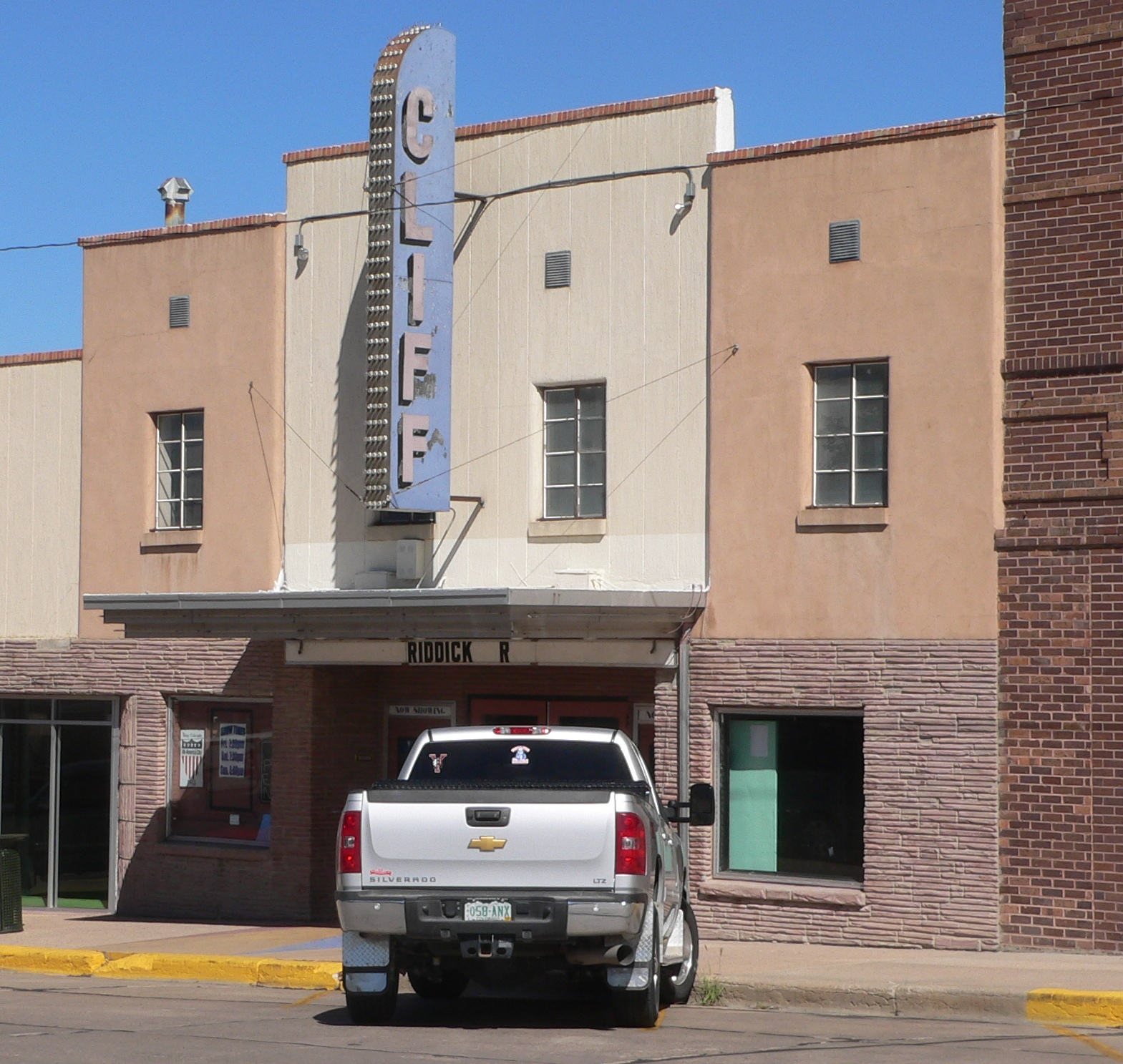

- Location within Colorado Location within the United States
- Location: 420 Main St., Wray, Colorado
- Coordinates: 40°4′39″N 102°13′19″W
- Area: less than one acre
- NRHP reference No.: 13000577
- Added to NRHP: August 6, 2013

The Cliff Theater is a movie theater and community center in Wray, Colorado. It was opened in 1950. In 2013, it was listed in the National Register of Historic Places.
