= Sim Hudson Motor Company Building =

- Hudson, Sim, Motor Company
- U.S. National Register of Historic Places
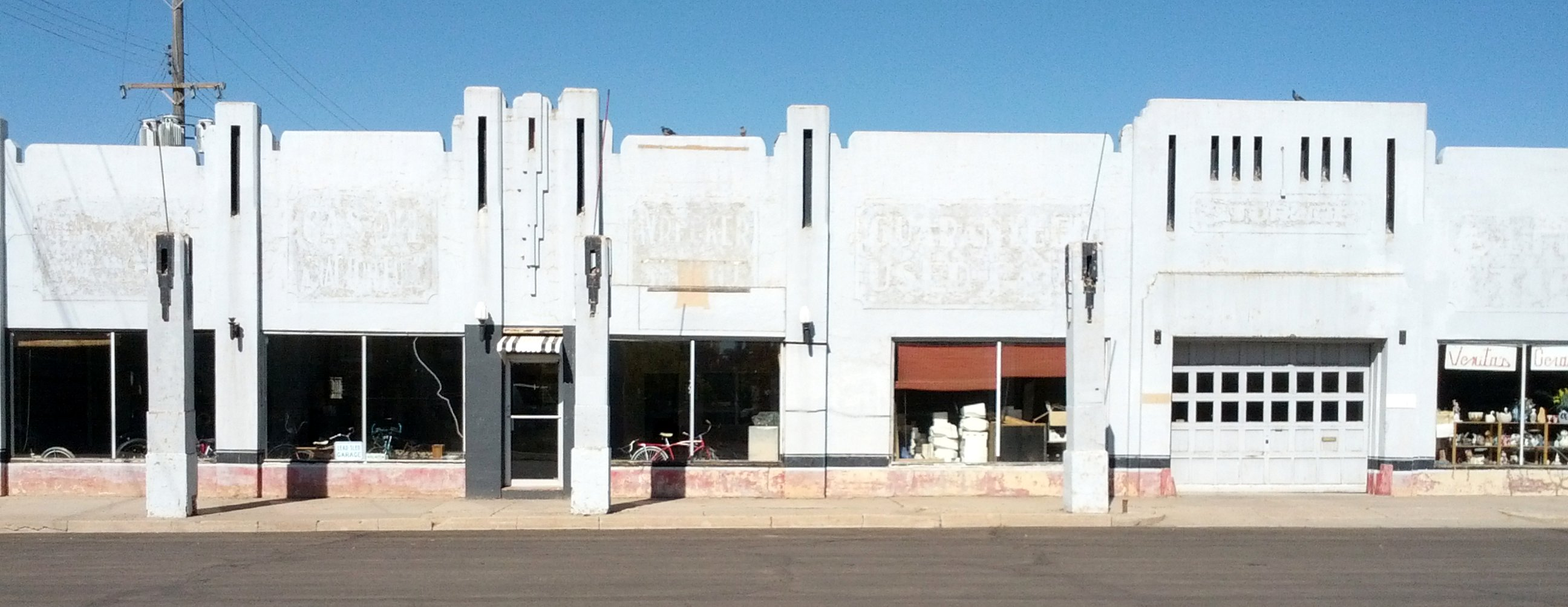

- Location within Colorado Location within the United States
- Location: 1332 Senter Ave., Burlington, Colorado
- Coordinates: 39°18′17″N 102°16′0″W
- Area: less than one acre
- Built: 1932
- Architectural style: Art Deco
- NRHP reference No.: 07001149
- Added to NRHP: November 7, 2007

The Sim Hudson Motor Company Building (also known as Golden Belt Garage or Vince's GM Center) is a historic commercial building located at 1332 Senter Avenue in Burlington, Colorado.

== Description and history ==
The one-story Sim Hudson Motor Company Building was originally built in 1920 in Burlington, Colorado to be the home of the Golden Belt Garage. A Sanborn map from 1913 indicates that buildings were previously on the site which must have been demolished for the construction of what initially was the Golden Belt Garage. The building was remodeled in 1932 when it was done in the popular Art Deco design of that period. As described in its NRHP designation, “The western half of the building has a flat roof and the eastern has a barrel roof, both covered with asphalt. An A-frame skylight pierces the flat roof near the north wall.”

It was listed on the National Register of Historic Places on November 7, 2007.
