= Nordlund House =

- U.S. National Register of Historic Places
- Colorado State Register of Historic Properties
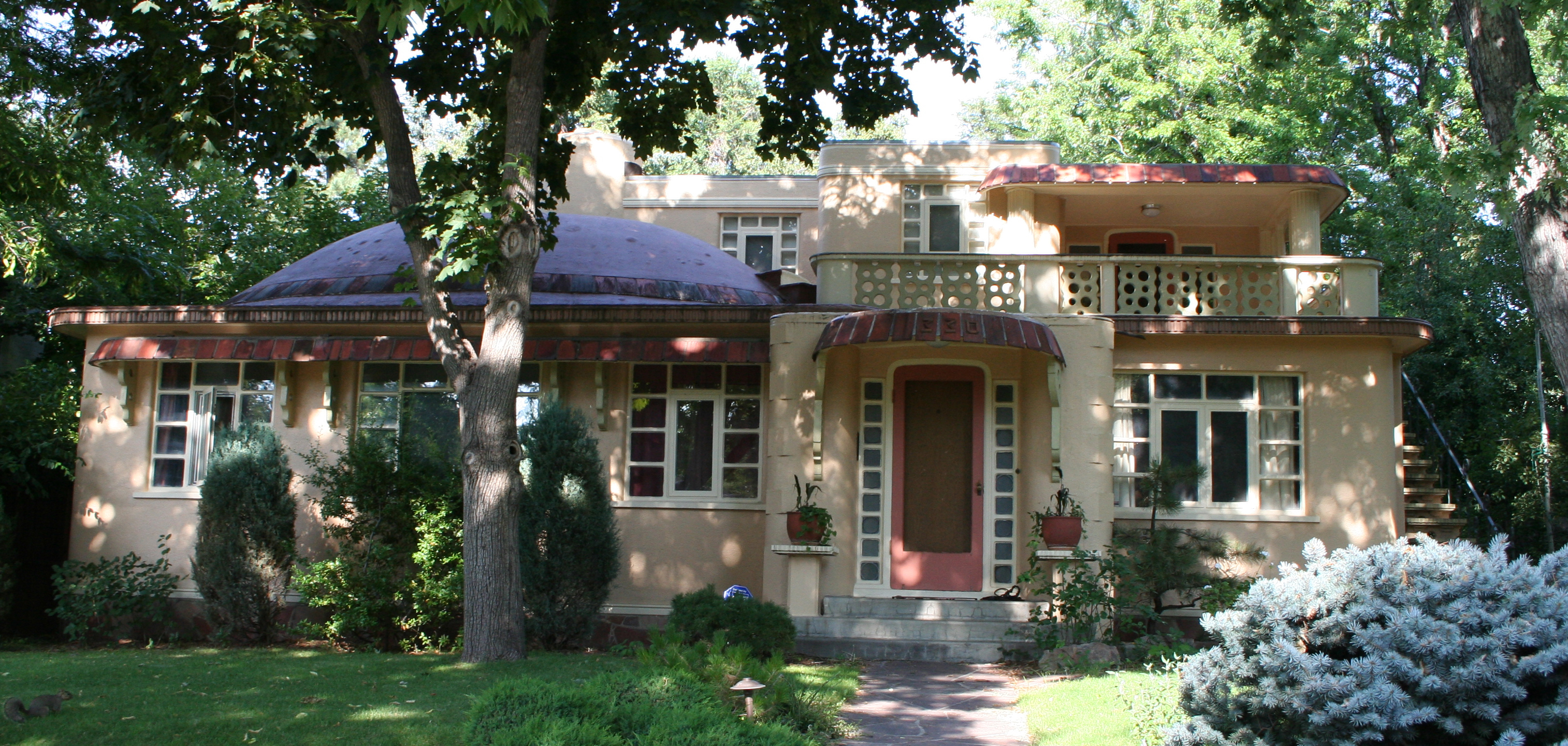

- Location within Colorado Location within the United States
- Location: 330 Birch Street, Hilltop, Denver, Colorado
- Coordinates: 39°43′18.22″N 104°56′9.51″W
- Architect: Eugene G. Groves
- Architectural style: American Craftsman
- NRHP reference No.: 98000081
- CSRHP No.: 5DV524
- Added to NRHP: February 12, 1998

Nordlund House is a historic house in central Denver, Colorado. Designed by Eugene G. Groves, it is a seven-level building and 3,000 square foot dwelling. The exterior is precast and poured-in-place, reinforced concrete, a process that was patented by Groves and made by his construction company. The exterior walls have rounded corners and are finished in stucco, and there is a rooftop terrace with a domed living room roof. Decorative elements include wrought iron and red glazed tiles.

Concrete is used within the interior of the house, including the built-in seating in the kitchen, kitchen countertops and cabinet faces, and bookcases. The house has an irregular, seven-level floor plan. It was placed on the National Register of Historic Places on February 12, 1998.
