= North Seventh Street Historic Residential District =

Historic district in Colorado, United States

- U.S. National Register of Historic Places
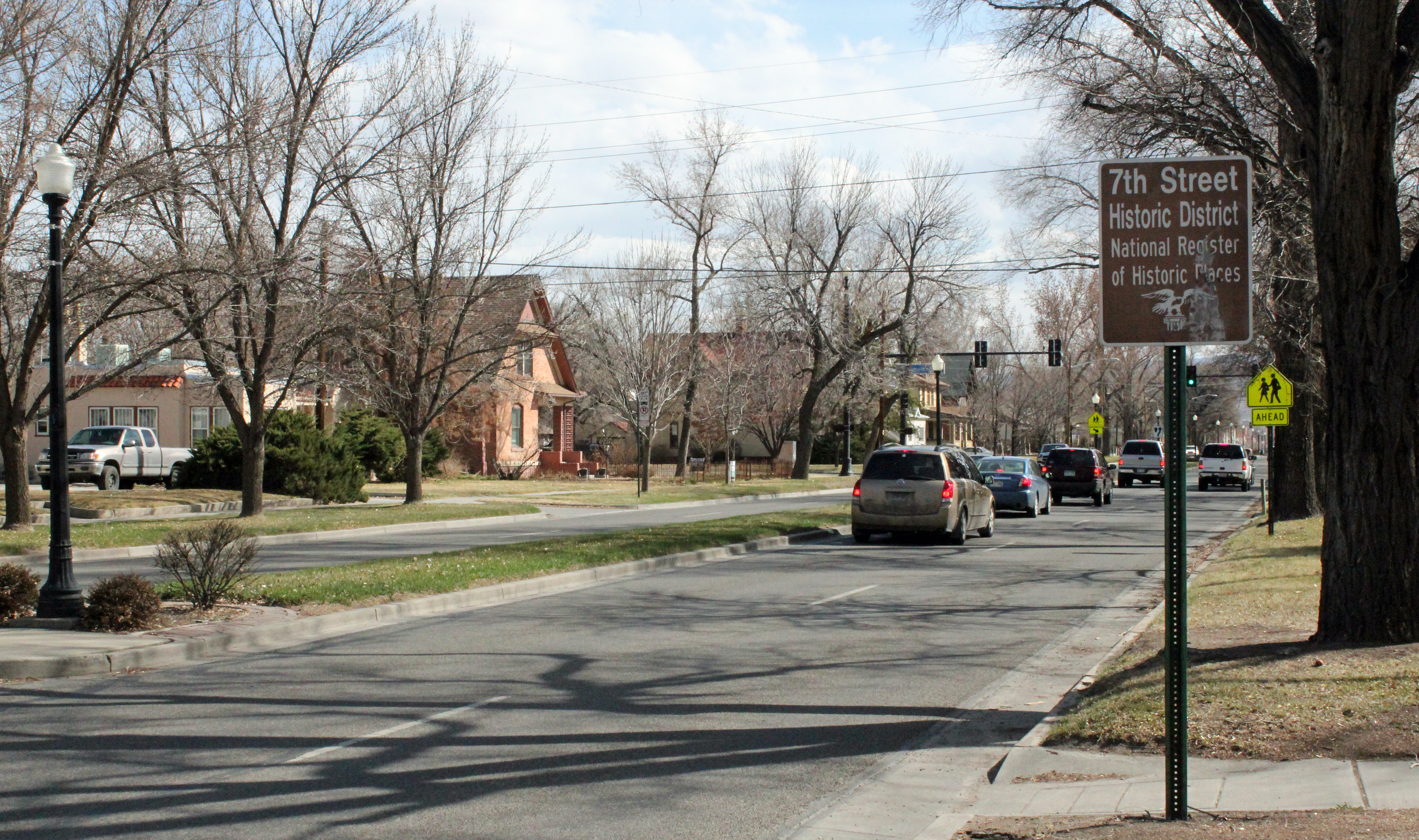

- Location within Colorado Location within the United States
- Location: 7th St. between Hill and White Aves., Grand Junction, Colorado
- Coordinates: 39°04′19″N 108°33′37″W
- Area: 14.4 acres (5.8 ha)
- Built: 1893
- Architect: Groves, Eugene
- Architectural style: Bungalow/craftsman, Mission/spanish Revival, Colonial Revival, Queen Anne
- NRHP reference No.: 84000870
- Added to NRHP: January 5, 1984

The North Seventh Street Historic Residential District, in Grand Junction, Colorado, is a 14.4 acres (5.8 ha) historic district which was listed on the National Register of Historic Places in 1984. It included 27 contributing buildings.

It includes the Lowell School (1925), at 310 North Seventh Street, built under the supervision of local architect Eugene Groves.
