= Leeman Auto Company Building =

- U.S. National Register of Historic Places
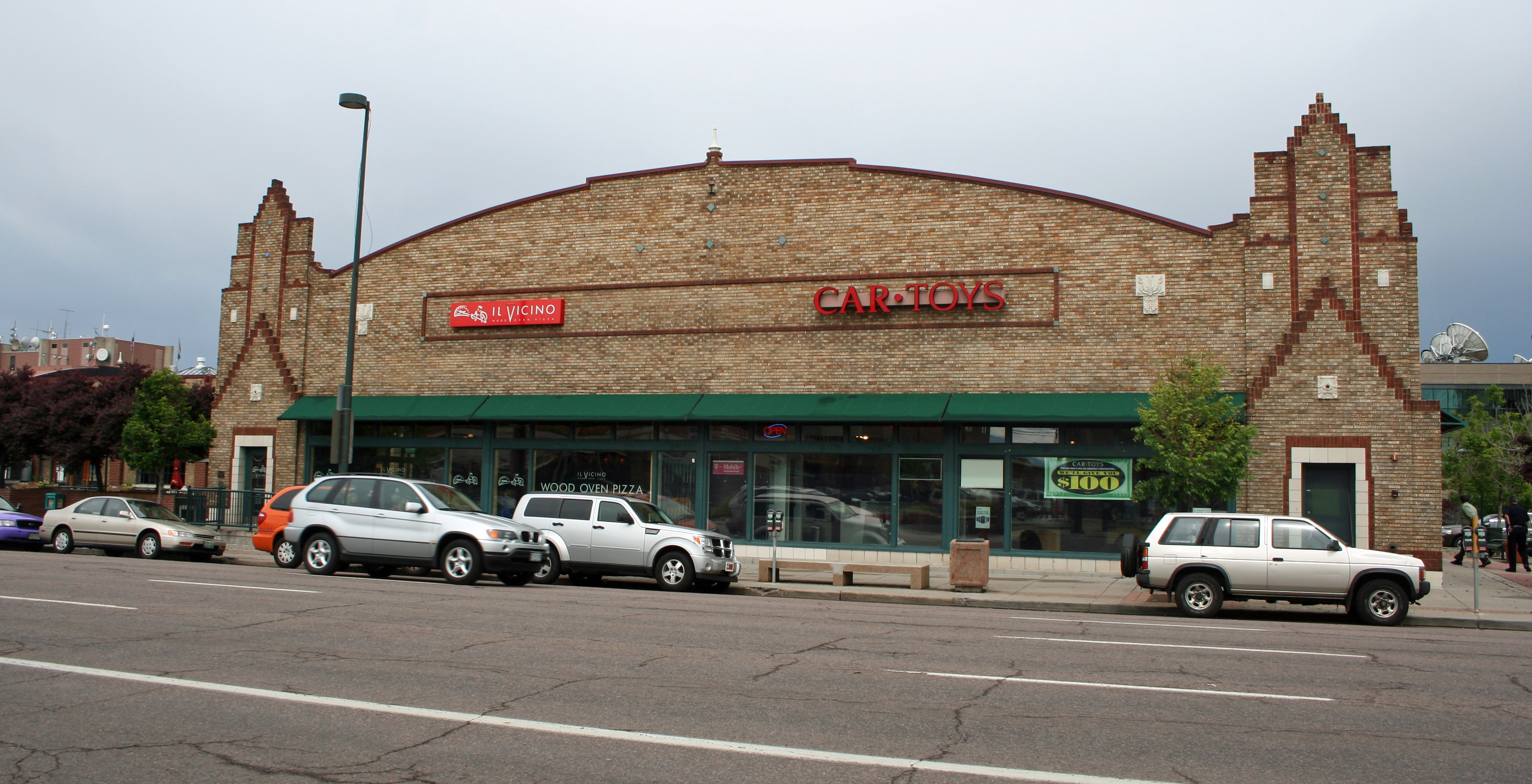

- Location within Colorado Location within the United States
- Location: 550 Broadway, Denver, Colorado
- Coordinates: 39°43′31″N 104°59′11″W
- Area: less than one acre
- Built: 1932-34
- Architect: Raymond Harry Ervin
- Architectural style: Art Deco
- NRHP reference No.: 01001054
- Added to NRHP: September 27, 2001

The Leeman Auto Company Building, at 550 Broadway in Denver, Colorado, United States, was built in 1932 and expanded in 1934. It was listed on the National Register of Historic Places in 2001.

It is an L-shaped one-story Art Deco-style building built of brick and terra cotta to serve as an automobile showroom and service facility.

The 1932 original building was probably designed by architect Raymond Harry Ervin; he is documented as having designed the large expansion in 1934.
