= Phillips County Courthouse (Colorado) =

- U.S. National Register of Historic Places
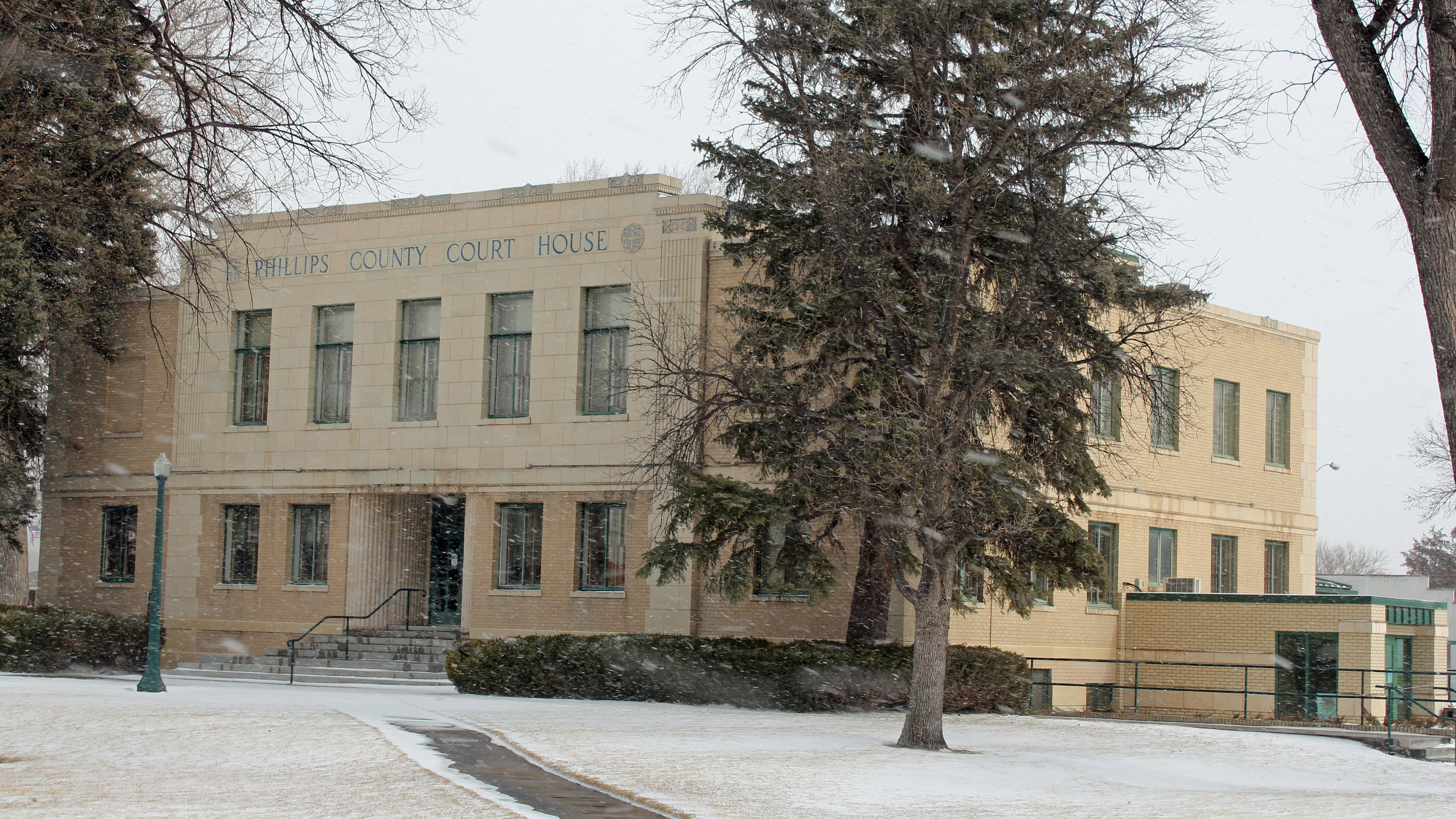
- Photo in 2013

- Location within Colorado Location within the United States
- Location: 221 Interocean Ave., Holyoke, Colorado
- Coordinates: 40°35′2″N 102°18′4″W
- Area: 2.5 acres (1.0 ha)
- Built: 1935
- Architect: Groves, Eugene
- Architectural style: Moderne
- MPS: New Deal Resources on Colorado's Eastern Plains MPS
- NRHP reference No.: 07001306
- Added to NRHP: December 28, 2007

The Phillips County Courthouse, home of the Phillips Combined Court, located at 221 Interocean Ave. in Holyoke, Colorado was built in 1935 in Moderne style. It is significant for association with New Deal programs; the Public Works Administration built it, and it is the only surviving PWA project in the county.

It was designed by Denver architect Eugene G. Groves (1882-1967).

It was listed on the National Register of Historic Places in 2007.
