= National Register of Historic Places listings in Montrose County, Colorado =

Location of Montrose County in Colorado

This is a list of the National Register of Historic Places listings in Montrose County, Colorado.

This is intended to be a complete list of the properties and districts on the National Register of Historic Places in Montrose County, Colorado, United States. The locations of National Register properties and districts for which the latitude and longitude coordinates are included below, may be seen in a map.

There are 30 properties and districts listed on the National Register in the county.

This National Park Service list is complete through NPS recent listings posted January 16, 2026.

== Current listings ==
	Name on the Register	Image	Date listed	Location	City or town	Description
1	Benevolent and Protective Order of Elks Lodge	Benevolent and Protective Order of Elks Lodge	April 6, 2004 (#04000260)	107 South Cascade Avenue; 38°28′43″N 107°52′31″W	Montrose	
2	D & RG Narrow Gauge Trestle	D & RG Narrow Gauge Trestle	June 18, 1976 (#76000172)	Northeast of Cimarron; 38°27′02″N 107°36′08″W	Cimarron	
3	Denver and Rio Grande Depot	Denver and Rio Grande Depot	June 3, 1982 (#82002308)	20 North Rio Grande Avenue; 38°28′41″N 107°52′45″W	Montrose	
4	Denver & Rio Grande Railroad Box Outfit Car No. 04414	Denver & Rio Grande Railroad Box Outfit Car No. 04414	July 23, 2009 (#09000568)	82800Q 83rd Road, Cimarron Visitor Center, Curecanti National Recreation Area (CURE); 38°26′31″N 107°33′19″W	Cimarron	
5	Denver & Rio Grande Western Railroad Boxcar No. 3132	Denver & Rio Grande Western Railroad Boxcar No. 3132	September 2, 2009 (#09000669)	Approximately 1 mile (1.6 km) north by northeast of U.S. Highway 50 at Cimarron, near Morrow Point Dam Road, Curecanti National Recreation Area; 38°26′36″N 107°33′19″W	Cimarron	
6	Denver & Rio Grande Western Railroad Caboose No. 0577	Denver & Rio Grande Western Railroad Caboose No. 0577	April 21, 2009 (#09000222)	Approximately 1 mile (1.6 km) north by northeast of U.S. Highway 50 at Cimarron, adjacent to Morrow Point Dam Road, Curecanti National Recreation Area; 38°26′36″N 107°33′19″W	Cimarron	
7	Denver & Rio Grande Western Railroad Locomotive No. 278 and Tender	Denver & Rio Grande Western Railroad Locomotive No. 278 and Tender	April 21, 2009 (#09000223)	38°26′36″N 107°33′19″W	Montrose	Was at: "Approximately 1 mile (1.6 km) north by northeast of U.S. Highway 50 at Cimarron, adjacent to Morrow Point Dam Road, Curecanti National Recreation Area"; now at Montrose museum?
8	Denver & Rio Grande Western Railroad Stock Car No. 5620	Denver & Rio Grande Western Railroad Stock Car No. 5620	January 27, 2010 (#09001276)	82800Q 83rd Rd. at the Cimarron Visitor Center in the Curecanti National Recreation Area; 38°26′36″N 107°33′19″W	Cimarron	
9	Denver & Rio Grande Western Railroad Stock Car No. 5679D	Denver & Rio Grande Western Railroad Stock Car No. 5679D	January 27, 2010 (#09001277)	82800Q 83rd Rd. at the Cimarron Visitor Center in the Curecanti National Recreation Area; 38°26′36″N 107°33′19″W	Cimarron	
10	Dolores River Bridge	Dolores River Bridge	October 15, 2002 (#02001150)	State Highway 90 at milepost 15.22; 38°18′38″N 108°53′09″W	Bedrock	Pennsylvania through truss Dismantled in 2014
11	Fetz-Keller Ranch Headquarters		July 23, 2019 (#100004211)	61789, 61801 CO 90; 38°27′01″N 107°56′03″W	Montrose	Boundary increase approved December 3, 2021
12	Gunnison Tunnel	Gunnison Tunnel	July 22, 1979 (#79000616)	East of Montrose; 38°29′55″N 107°40′38″W	Montrose	Irrigation water tunnel, which, at time of completion in 1909, was longest such tunnel in the world
13	Hanging Flume	Hanging Flume	May 15, 1980 (#80000917)	5.7 miles (9.2 km) northwest of Uravan on State Highway 141; 38°24′06″N 108°47′56″W	Uravan	
14	Henry Huff Cabin		August 6, 2019 (#100004228)	Address Restricted	Naturita vicinity	
15	Knights of Pythias (KP) Building	Knights of Pythias (KP) Building	March 18, 2024 (#100010081)	33 South Cascade Avenue; 38°28′44″N 107°52′33″W	Montrose	
16	J. V. Lathrop House	J. V. Lathrop House	July 8, 1988 (#88001016)	718 Main Street; 38°28′55″N 107°52′19″W	Montrose	
17	Methodist Episcopal Church of Montrose	Methodist Episcopal Church of Montrose	November 30, 1999 (#99001407)	19 South Park Avenue; 38°28′50″N 107°52′24″W	Montrose	
18	Montrose City Hall	Montrose City Hall	June 3, 1982 (#82002309)	433 South 1st Street; 38°28′45″N 107°52′29″W	Montrose	
19	Montrose County Courthouse	Montrose County Courthouse	February 18, 1994 (#94000040)	320 South 1st Street; 38°28′41″N 107°52′31″W	Montrose	
20	Montrose Fruit & Produce Association Building	Montrose Fruit & Produce Association Building	July 27, 2020 (#100005380)	39 West Main St. 38°28′37″N 107°52′49″W	Montrose	
21	Montrose Masonic Temple, Lodge No. 63	Montrose Masonic Temple, Lodge No. 63	April 6, 2004 (#04000259)	509–513 East Main Street; 38°28′51″N 107°52′29″W	Montrose	
22	North Rim Road, Black Canyon of the Gunnison National Park	North Rim Road, Black Canyon of the Gunnison National Park	September 6, 2005 (#05001181)	Black Canyon of the Gunnison National Park; 38°34′23″N 107°41′28″W	Crawford	
23	Rio Grande Southern Railroad Derrick Car	Rio Grande Southern Railroad Derrick Car	May 10, 2010 (#10000237)	82800Q 83rd Rd, Cimarron Visitor Center, Curecanti National Recreation Area; 38°26′36″N 107°33′19″W	Cimarron	
24	Shavano Valley Rock Art Site		October 12, 2001 (#01001106)	Address Restricted; Boundary increase (listed March 27, 2012, refnum 12000147): Montrose vicinity	Montrose	Site of aboriginal art panels.
25	Sherman and Ross Block Building	Sherman and Ross Block Building	April 11, 2003 (#03000196)	232–236 Main Street; 38°28′42″N 107°52′38″W	Montrose	
26	Silesca Ranger Station	Silesca Ranger Station	January 12, 2005 (#04001464)	Grand Mesa in the Uncompahgre and Gunnison National Forests; 38°19′56″N 108°07′29″W	Grand Mesa	
27	Thomas B. Townsend House	Thomas B. Townsend House	September 17, 1980 (#80000916)	222 South 5th Street; 38°28′28″N 107°52′23″W	Montrose	
28	US Bureau of Reclamation Project Office Building	US Bureau of Reclamation Project Office Building	November 27, 1991 (#91001685)	601 North Park Avenue; 38°29′08″N 107°52′43″W	Montrose	
29	US Post Office-Montrose Main	US Post Office-Montrose Main	January 22, 1986 (#86000183)	321 South 1st Street; 38°28′44″N 107°52′36″W	Montrose	
30	Ute Memorial Site	Ute Memorial Site	February 26, 1970 (#70000167)	2 miles (3.2 km) south of Montrose on U.S. Highway 550; 38°26′04″N 107°52′02″W	Montrose	

== See also ==
- List of National Historic Landmarks in Colorado
- List of National Register of Historic Places in Colorado
- Bibliography of Colorado
- Geography of Colorado
- History of Colorado
- Index of Colorado-related articles
- List of Colorado-related lists
- Outline of Colorado
