= Fetz =

Fetz is a surname of German origin, meaning "scrap rag", referring to a sloppy or disorderly person. Notable people with the surname include:

- Anita Fetz (born 1957), Swiss politician and entrepreneur
- Eberhard Fetz (born 1940), American neuroscientist, academic, and researcher
- Friedrich Fetz (1927–2013), Austrian gymnast
- Johann Franz Fetz (1809–1884), Swiss-Liechtensteiner priest

== See also ==
- Fetz-Keller Ranch, a historic ranch near Montrose, Colorado
