= Museum of the Mountain West =

- Location: Montrose, Colorado
- Coordinates: 38.487973°N 107.813798°W
- Type: History museum
- Website: http://www.museumofthemountainwest.org

The Museum of the Mountain West is a history museum off U.S. Route 50 in Montrose, Colorado. It includes a collection of historic log cabins, Western town stores, and other historic buildings which have been moved to the site.

The museum was listed on the Colorado state register of historic properties in 2018.

The museum also owns a historic carriage shop, not on the same site, where eventual champion boxer Jack Dempsey trained.

It is located at 68191 E. Miami Road, bordering on U.S. Route 50, 3.9 miles (6.3 km) east of the center of downtown Montrose.

== See also ==
- Montrose County Historical Museum
- Ute Indian Museum
