= Montrose County Historical Museum =

The Montrose County Historical Museum
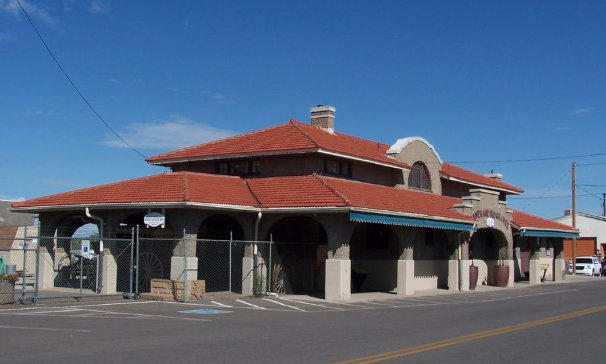
- Established: 1973
- Location: Montrose, Colorado
- Coordinates: 38.4781°N 107.8800°W
- Type: History museum
- Website: http://www.montrosehistory.org

The Montrose County Historical Museum is located in Montrose, Colorado, USA, founded in 1973 by the Montrose County Historical Society. The society's mission is to preserve, display and interpret the historic and cultural legacy of Montrose County (incorporated in 1882) and its surrounding region. Its building, the Denver and Rio Grande Depot, is listed on the National Register of Historic Places.

== History ==
The historical museum is located in the original 1912 Denver and Rio Grande Depot in downtown Montrose, Colorado. In the late 1800s the narrow gauge railroad was the main mode of transportation. The daily operation of passenger and freight trains promoted the growth of Montrose. The 1920s saw a rapid decline in railroad transportation due to the fast increase in the use of automobiles and trucks. The loss of business caused the railroads to discontinue passenger scheduled service. The depot ended its use as a train station in the 1950s. In 1972 the Denver and Rio Grande Western Railroad Company donated the depot and the land to the city of Montrose to use as a museum. The Montrose Historical Society has operated in this location since that time. The museum attracts diverse visitors from across Colorado, the United States, and abroad.

== Collection ==
The Montrose County Historical Museum houses numerous collections that were donated by the region's pioneer families that pertain to the historical story of Montrose. For researchers the museum holds local newspapers from 1896 to 1940, hundreds of photos, a data base of the historic buildings from first built until today, local publications, and records on file.

Many facets of Montrose area history are explored within the museum, including Native Americans, homesteaders, farmers, ranchers, railroaders, and miners. A tour inside the old depot gives a hint of what life was like in the early days in Montrose.

- The ticket room, now known as the railroad room, contains original survey equipment from the construction of the Gunnison Tunnel, cameras, miners tools and railroad memorabilia.
- The electrical room features rare memorabilia from Ames, Colorado, the first alternating current plant in the world.
- Upstairs contains the antique toys, dolls, school items, and music items such as a grand piano from the Gray family, a World War I Edison Phonograph, and a rare Victrola player.
- The freight room contains the original freight scale, farm tools, saddles, more tools, typewriters, and a general store with well stocked shelves.

The museum has worked to build this lasting tribute to the pioneers and founders of Montrose County; 90% of all artifacts are from Montrose and 10% from the outlying area.

Approximately half of the museum's artifacts are held outside in a large courtyard. These objects mostly include automotive parts, agricultural equipment, and carriages. Also included are a stagecoach that ran the Montrose-Durango route, an Ice wagon, and several tractors. Two tractors have been restored. In addition to such artifacts, the museum also displays two log cabins in this courtyard. One cabin, known as the Lashley Cabin, which contains a traditional bed, kitchen, and modest furniture; reflecting the simple homes and lives of those who first settled in the Montrose area. This cabin was reclaimed as a historical artifact, once owned and lived in by a mother and her five children. A second cabin, known as the Cowboy Cabin, houses artifacts and memorabilia relating to the agricultural history of Montrose. The outdoor collection further includes a train caboose from the Union Pacific train route. The caboose served as a living and working quarters for train conductors throughout the Denver to Salt Lake City travel route.

== Public engagement ==
The Montrose County Historical Museum has a storied tradition of interacting with the public by means of various tours, special exhibitions, and other events. The museum engages closely with activities created by the city government, downtown development authority and tourism board, the county, and the Montrose Recreation District. One such event is the annual Fourth of July parade that travels down the Main Street of Montrose; in this parade, the museum displays a float to educate local residents and tourists not only of the presence of the museum but also of the history it holds. Another popular event that the museum puts on throughout its open season is a series of historical walks. These walks function as a series of guided tours, exploring a number of historical places in Montrose and surrounding areas. Popular historical walks include the prohibition walk, unknown stories of downtown buildings walk, secret societies walk, and the ghost walk during Halloween.

Outside of city-sponsored events, the museum has sought to educate the public through a number of independent events. One such event is the Pioneer Social, where the families of local pioneers are invited to discuss and educate the community regarding their family history and place within the Montrose community. Another such extra-city organized event occurs during the annual Youth Appreciation Day. Here, the museum hosts a free scavenger hunt for students, and offers other historical activities such as an opportunity to pan for gold and wash period based clothing. The museum also engages with a wider community through its Facebook page.

== See also ==
- Ute Indian Museum
- Museum of the Mountain West
