= Montrose station (Colorado) =

- Denver and Rio Grande Depot
- U.S. National Register of Historic Places
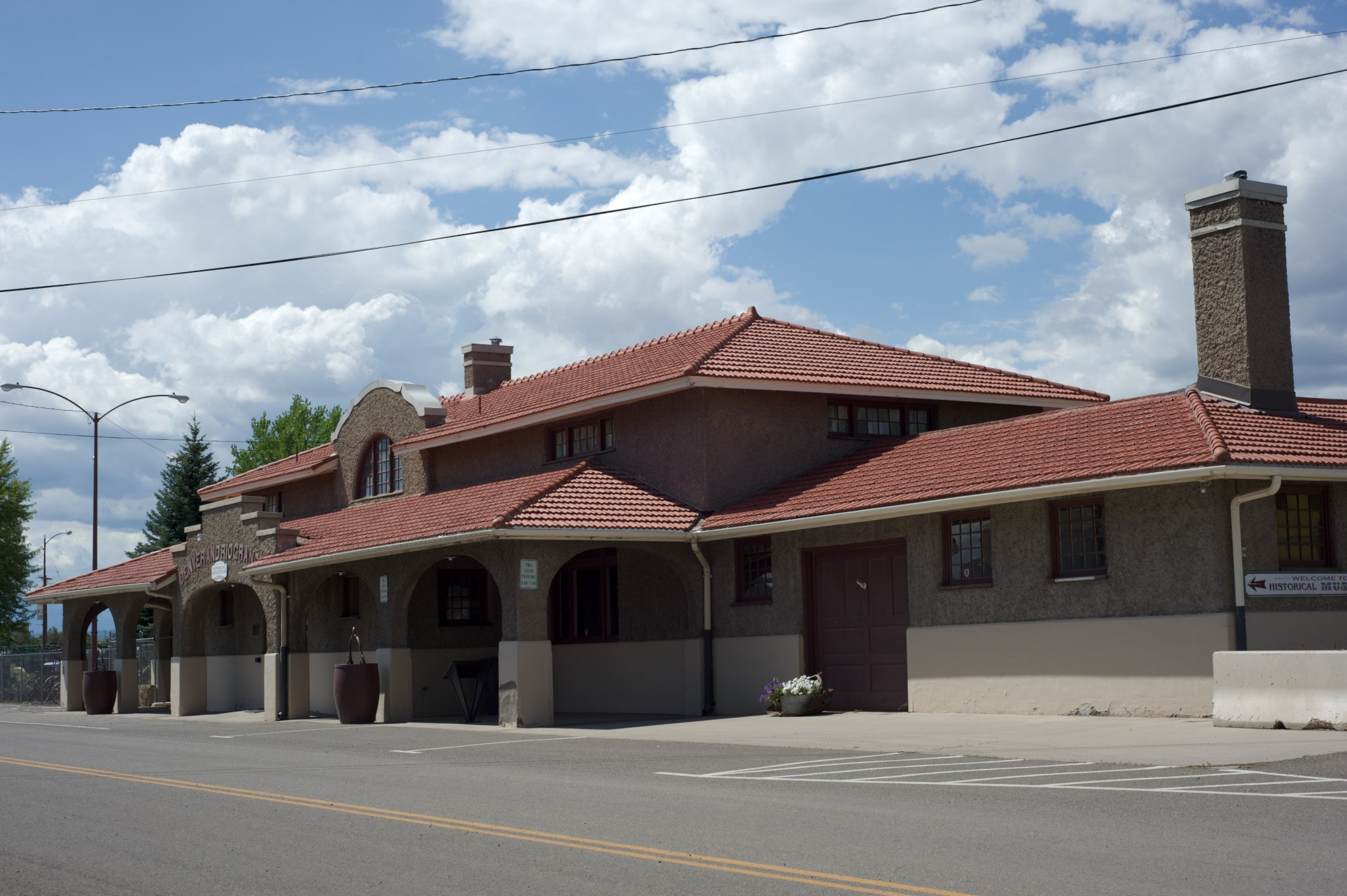
- Building in 2011

- Location within Colorado Location within the United States
- Location: 20 N. Rio Grande Ave., Montrose, Colorado
- Coordinates: 38.4781°N 107.8799°W
- Area: 0.5 acres (0.20 ha)
- Built: between 1908 and 1912
- Architectural style: Mission/Spanish Revival
- NRHP reference No.: 82002308
- Added to NRHP: June 3, 1982

The Denver and Rio Grande Depot, also known as the Montrose Railroad Depot, is a historic railway station in Montrose, Colorado. The building is listed on the National Register of Historic Places, has housed the Montrose County Historical Museum since the 1970s.

== History ==
The Denver and Rio Grande Railway first reached Montrose in 1882, and by 1885, it was described as the "most important station west of Gunnison City". The current depot was built sometime between 1908 and 1912, replacing a previous facility. The station served both passengers and freight. The railway branched south out of Montrose to Ouray and the Rio Grande Southern Railroad, and it branched east to Gunnison and Crested Butte.

The depot was nominated for inclusion on the National Register of Historic Places for its architectural and transportation significance; it was listed on June 3, 1982. Beginning circa 1980, the depot has housed the Montrose County Historical Museum. Part of the building has also been rented to the Continental Trailways bus system.

== Architecture and setting ==
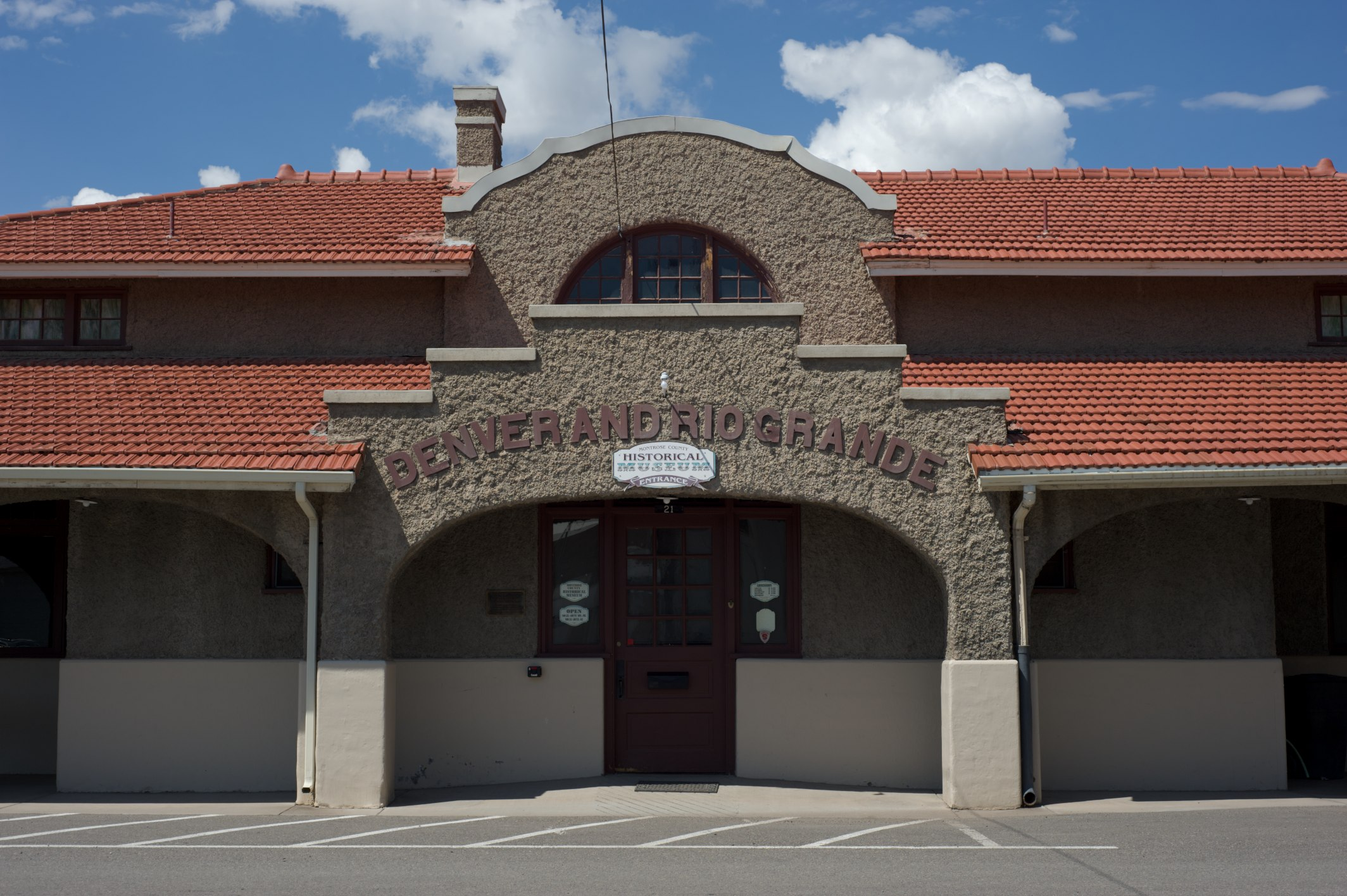
Detail of the main entrance

The depot is located in downtown Montrose, and is described as an "architectural bright spot". It has a Mission Revival design, characterized by the arcades, terra cotta tile roof, and curvilinear parapets. It is a one-story structure, approximately rectangular, with main facades along the east (street side) and west (track side). Two chimneys protrude from the roof. The lower 48 inches (1.2 m) of the exterior is concrete with a wainscot appearance, above which is rough concrete stucco.

A spur track used to exist to the south of the station, since replaced by a parking lot.

== See also ==
- National Register of Historic Places listings in Montrose County, Colorado
