= Benevolent and Protective Order of Elks Lodge (Montrose, Colorado) =

- U.S. National Register of Historic Places
- Colorado State Register of Historic Properties
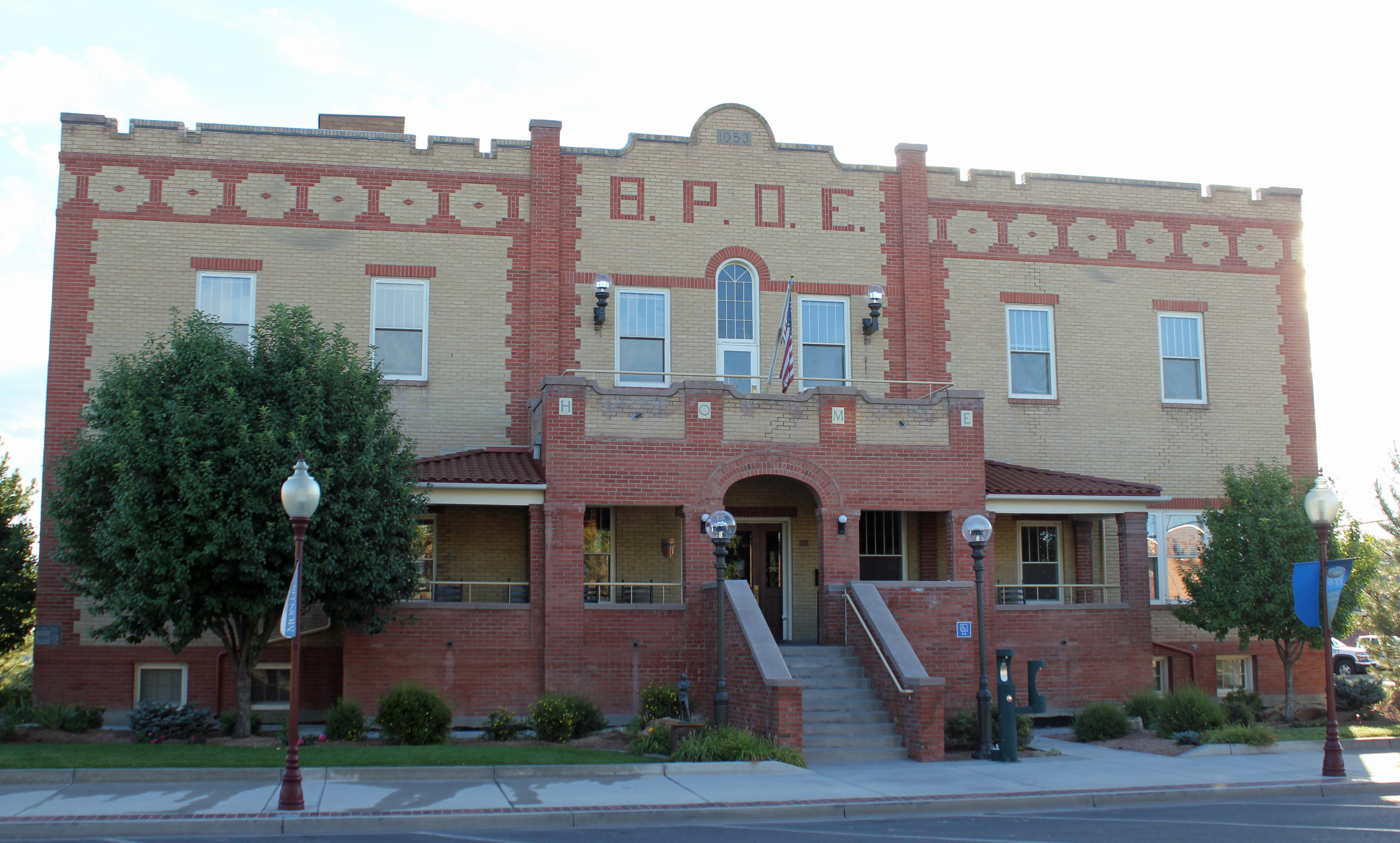
- The property in 2014.

- Location within Colorado Location within the United States
- Location: 107 S. Cascade Ave., Montrose, Colorado
- Coordinates: 38.4786°N 107.8753°W
- Area: less than one acre
- Built: 1927
- Built by: White & Okey
- Architect: Antrobus, J.H.
- Architectural style: Mixed style
- NRHP reference No.: 04000260
- CSRHP No.: 5MN.5045

Significant dates
- Added to NRHP: April 6, 2004
- Designated CSRHP: March 10, 2004

The Benevolent and Protective Order of Elks Lodge, also known as the Elks Civic Building, is a historic building in Montrose, Colorado, United States. It served as an Elks lodge from construction in 1927 until 1969, and has since housed a college and city offices. In 2017 it was, and in 2019 still is, the location of the city's Visitors' Center. The building is listed on the Colorado State Register of Historic Properties and the National Register of Historic Places.

== History ==
Elks Lodge 1053 was first organized in Montrose in late 1906 as an affiliate of Ouray Lodge 492. In 1926, work on building the historic lodge building began. Architect J.H. Antrobus created plans in mid-1926 and the construction contract was awarded to firm White and Okey on August 13, 1926. The cornerstone was laid on November 18, 1926, to an audience of seventy-five Elks members, and construction began in early 1927. The lodge was built at a cost of $34,600 and was officially occupied on May 26, 1927.

The building served as an Elks lodge until 1969, when the group moved to a new building that was constructed downtown. The former lodge was then used by Colorado Western College until this educational establishment closed in 1972 for lack of funding. Montrose County Social Services used the building from 1976 to 2003. The building was bought in 2003 by the City of Montrose for $400,000. It underwent renovation to house city offices and was renamed the "Elks Civic Building".

The building was added to the Colorado State Register of Historic Properties on March 10, 2004. It was nominated for inclusion on the National Register of Historic Places under Criterion A for its role in social history as an Elks Lodge and Criterion C for its architectural significance. It was listed on the National Register on April 6, 2004.

== Architecture ==
The building features an eclectic mixed style with elements of Mission Revival, Pueblo Deco, and Late Gothic Revival styles. The facade consists mostly of blond brick in running bond with accents of red brick. In the curved portion of the parapet is a stone block inscribed with "1053", and the letters "BPOE" are formed by red bricks below. (Note: "1053" refers to the chapter number of the Lodge)

== See also ==
- National Register of Historic Places listings in Montrose County, Colorado
- List of Elks buildings
