= Shavano Valley Rock Art Site =

- U.S. National Register of Historic Places
- Nearest city: Montrose, Colorado
- NRHP reference No.: 01001106
- Added to NRHP: October 12, 2001

The Shavano Valley Rock Art Site, in Montrose County, Colorado near the city of Montrose, is a historic site which was listed on the National Register of Historic Places in 2001.

It is on private land and is accessible by tours arranged by the Ute Museum in Montrose.
