= U.S. Bureau of Reclamation Project Office Building =

- US Bureau of Reclamation Project Office Building
- U.S. National Register of Historic Places
- U.S. Historic district
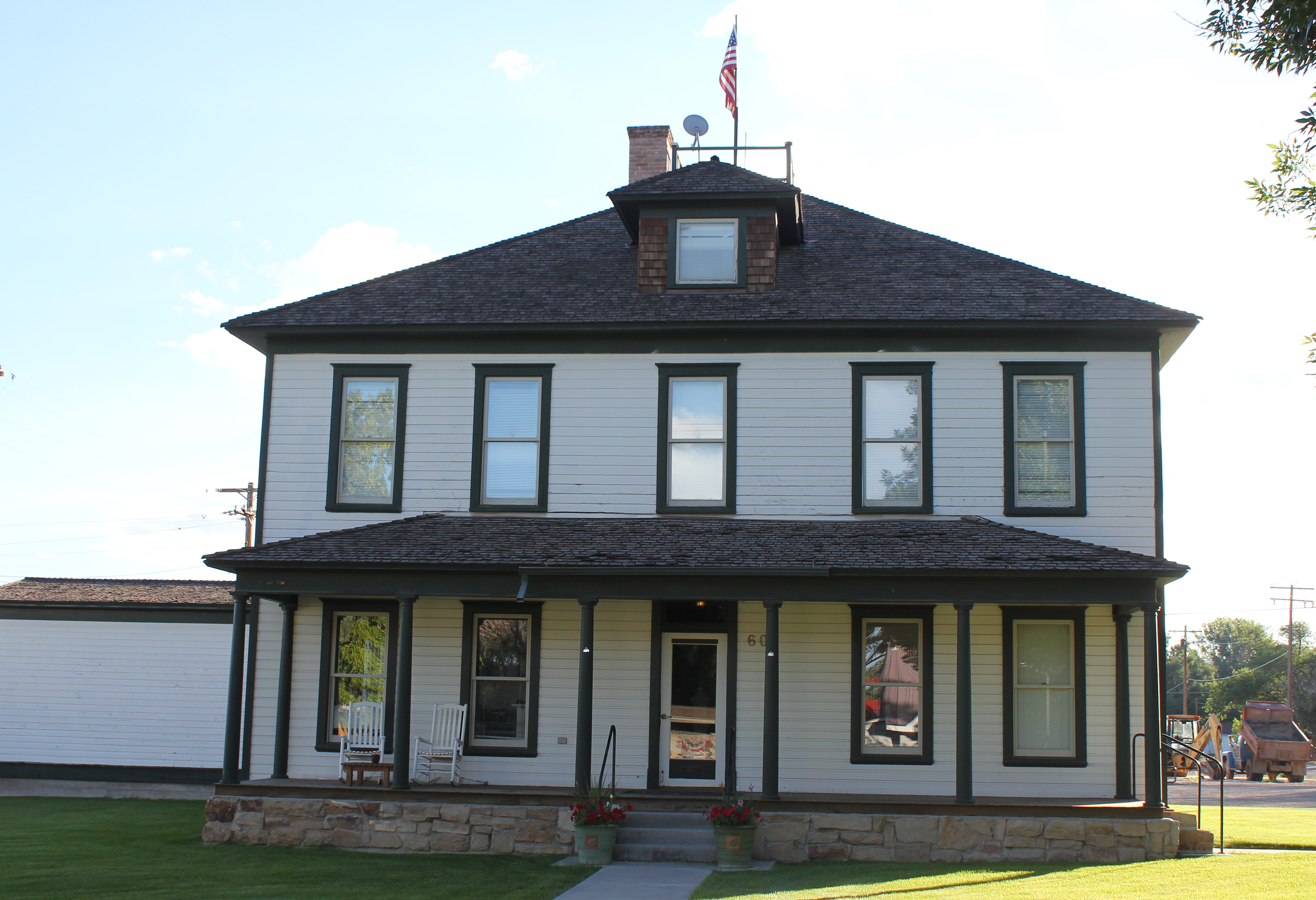
- The building in 2014

- Location within Colorado Location within the United States
- Location: 601 N. Park Ave., Montrose, Colorado
- Coordinates: 38°29′8″N 107°52′43″W
- Area: less than one acre
- Built by: U.S. Bureau of Reclamation, J.J. Kewin
- Architectural style: Four Square
- NRHP reference No.: 91001685
- Added to NRHP: November 27, 1991

The US Bureau of Reclamation Project Office Building in Montrose, Colorado is listed on the National Register of Historic Places. It has also been known as the Uncompahgre Valley Water Users Association Office. The NRHP listing included five contributing buildings.

It was built by contractor J.J. Kewin.
