= Rio Grande Southern Railroad Derrick Car =

- U.S. National Register of Historic Places
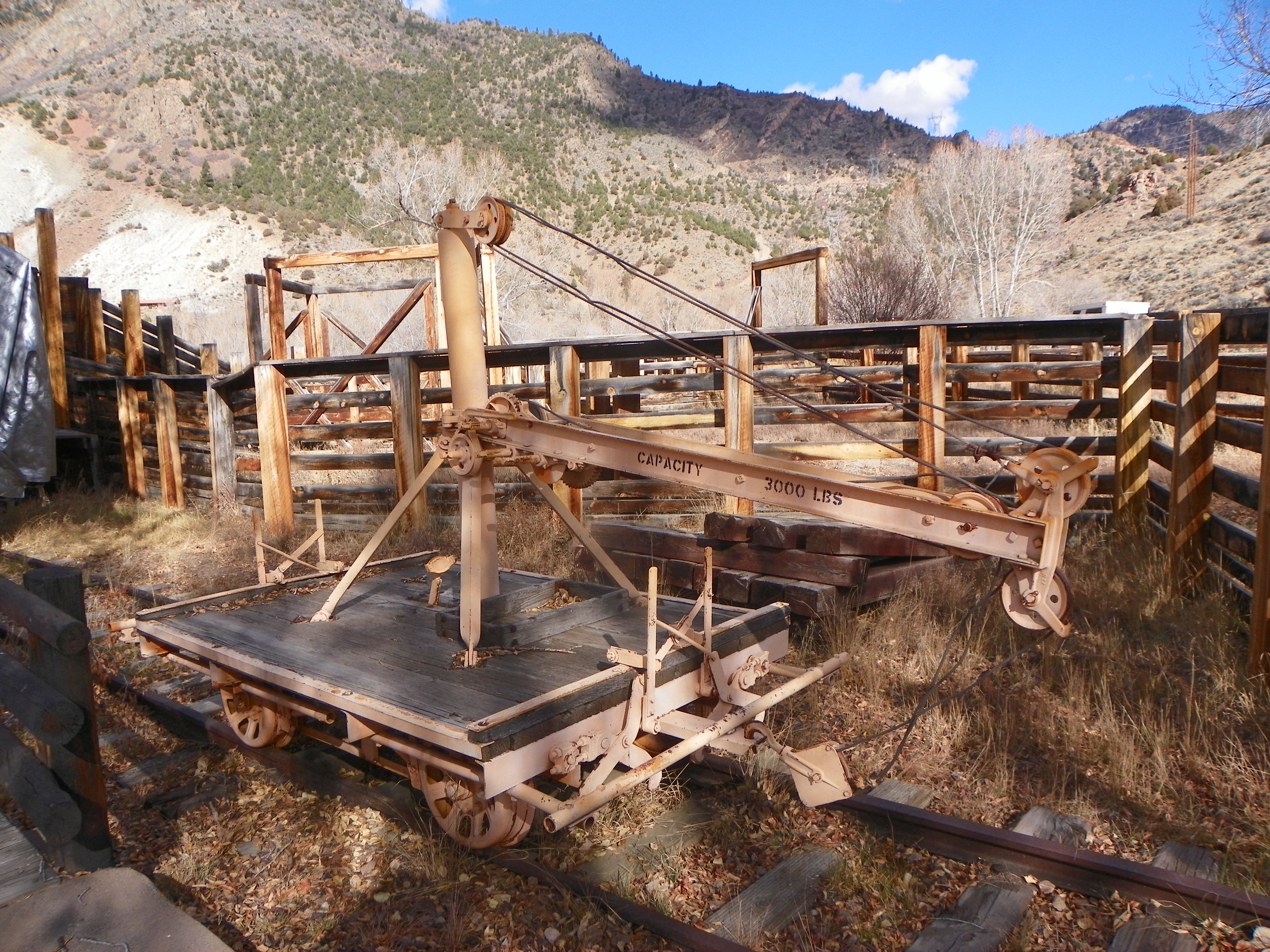

- Location within Colorado Location within the United States
- Location: 82800Q 83rd Rd, Cimarron Visitor Center, Curecanti National Recreation Area, Cimarron, Colorado
- Coordinates: 38°26′36″N 107°33′19″W
- Area: less than one acre
- Built: 1948
- Built by: Fairmont Railway Motors Inc.
- NRHP reference No.: 10000237
- Added to NRHP: May 10, 2010

The Rio Grande Southern Railroad Derrick Car is a railroad derrick car which was produced in 1948 for the Rio Grande Southern Railroad. It is one of only three W60 Series A Derrick Cars narrow-gauge examples ever built by the Fairmont Railway Motors Inc., and it is the only one still extant. It is located at the Cimarron Visitor Center of the Curecanti National Recreation Area, in Cimarron, Colorado. It was listed on the National Register of Historic Places in 2010.
