= Thomas B. Townsend House =

Historic house in Colorado, United States

- U.S. National Register of Historic Places
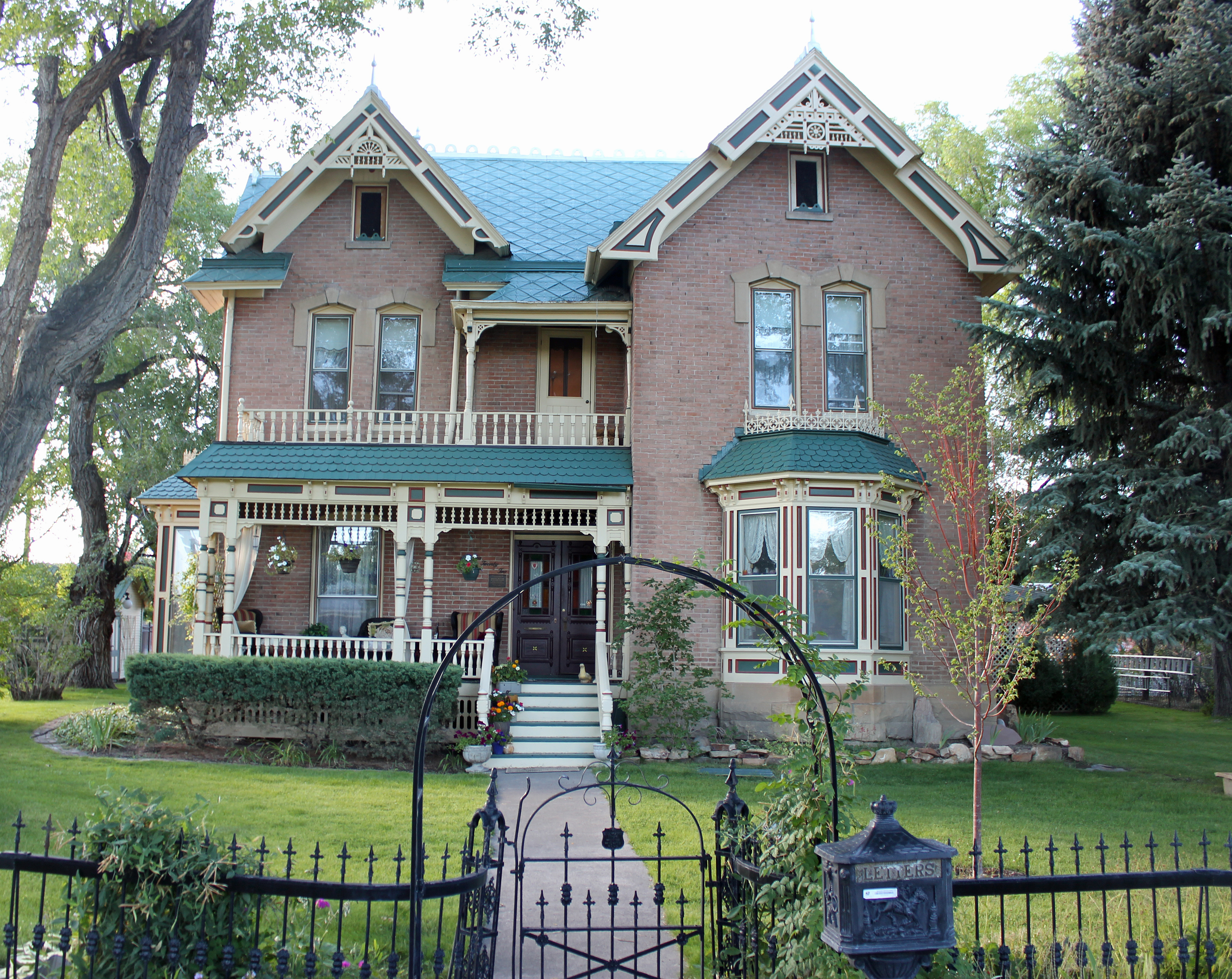
- The property in 2014.

- Location within Colorado Location within the United States
- Location: 222 S. 5th St., Montrose, Colorado
- Coordinates: 38°28′28″N 107°52′23″W
- Area: less than one acre
- Built: 1888; 138 years ago
- Architectural style: Late Victorian
- NRHP reference No.: 80000916
- Added to NRHP: September 17, 1980

The Thomas B. Townsend House, on the corner of Townsend Street and S. 5th St. in Montrose, Colorado, was built in 1888. It was listed on the National Register of Historic Places (NRHP) in 1980.

According to its NRHP nomination, it is "one of the oldest permanent residences in the valley" and had "'running water'" from a system of rain troughs and a cistern in its attic. The house "is an excellent example of the American Victorian style of architecture." The house is built of brick from a brick plant that may have been used only to make bricks for this house.
