= Montrose Masonic Temple =

United States historic place

- Montrose Masonic Temple, Lodge No. 63
- U.S. National Register of Historic Places
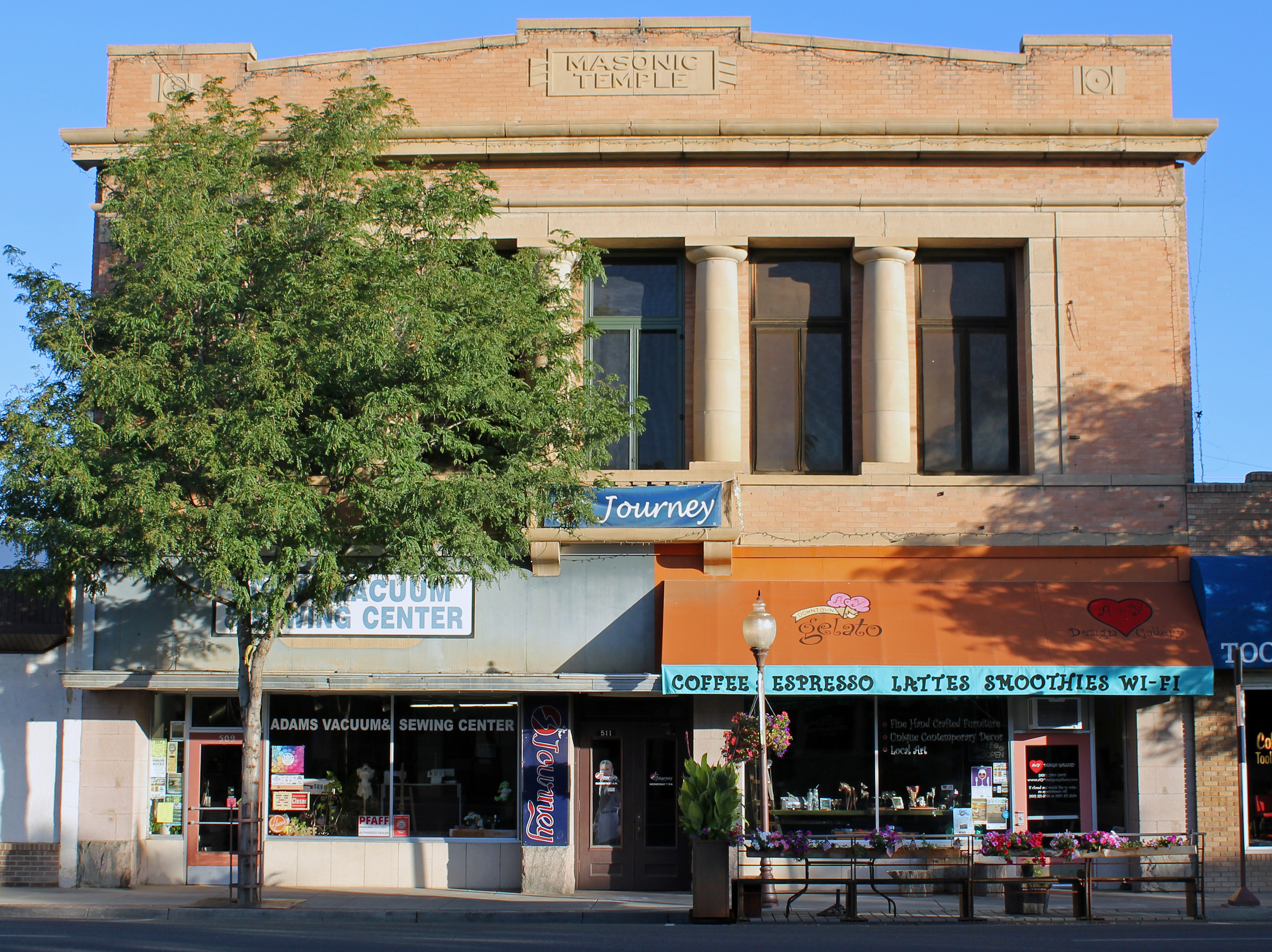
- The property in 2014.

- Location within Colorado Location within the United States
- Location: 509-513 E. Main St., Montrose, Colorado
- Coordinates: 38°28′51″N 107°52′29″W
- Area: less than one acre
- Built: 1911
- Built by: Hill, Frank; White & Okey
- Architectural style: Classical Revival
- NRHP reference No.: 04000259
- Added to NRHP: April 6, 2004

The Montrose Masonic Temple in Montrose, Colorado is a historic building constructed in 1911. Built as a meeting hall for Montrose Lodge No. 63, Ancient Free and Accepted Masons, the building is in the Classical Revival style. The Masons met in the upper two of the building's three stories, while the ground floor was rented out as commercial space. Its commercial space has been rented to the Adams Vacuum and Sewing company, to a printing and office supply store, and to a funeral home. The lodge no longer meets in the building. The building was listed on the National Register of Historic Places in 2004.

The "defining feature" of the building is its five-bay window area divided by four Tuscan stone columns.

As of 2021 the building is home of Precedence Productions, which uses the second floor area for musical events open to the public, and operates a music academy.
