= Montrose Botanic Gardens =

Garden in Montrose, Colorado

Coordinates: 38°27′54″N 107°51′07″W

The Montrose Botanic Gardens are located at 1800 Pavilion Drive, Montrose, Colorado, south of the Montrose Pavilion.

While in the gardens, you can view the San Juan Mountains to the south.

The Gardens are 3.5 acres of which a little over 1 acre is developed. A Master Plan is in-place to develop the Gardens fully over the coming years.

A few picnic tables and benches under shade are scattered around the developed area.

Open dawn to dusk. Free entry, but donations are always appreciated.

Note that dogs are NOT allowed.

== See also ==
- List of botanical gardens in the United States
