= David Dragoo =

American businessman

- Born: October 9, 1985 (age 40); Colorado Springs, Colorado, U.S.
- Education: Georgia Institute of Technology (BS)
- Occupation: Entrepreneur
- Years active: 2012-present
- Spouse: Heidi Dragoo (m. 2013)
- Children: 1

David Dragoo (born October 9, 1985) is an American entrepreneur and businessman. Dragoo earned a degree with honors from the Georgia Institute of Technology in 2009, where he also participated in NCAA Division I athletics as an Academic All-American in golf.

== Early life and education ==
David Cuyler Dragoo was born on October 9, 1985, in Colorado Springs, Colorado to Elizabeth and Doug Dragoo. In 2005, Dragoo graduated from Brophy College Preparatory in Phoenix, Arizona. He enrolled at Georgia Tech on a golf scholarship, graduating in 2009. He played for Hall of Fame Coach Bruce Heppler, including with teammates and fellow PGA Tour players Cameron Tringale, Roberto Castro, Nicholas Thompson, Paul Haley and Chesson Hadley.

== Career ==
Dragoo is the founder of Mayfly, a Colorado-based company and Certified B® Corporation. Mayfly specializes in manufacturing premium fly fishing equipment, including brands Abel®, Ross Reels®, Airflo®, Renzetti®, and Dyna-King®. The company is financial contributor to conservation, focused mainly on fishing habitat improvements and stream restoration, working closely with the Colorado chapter of Trout Unlimited. In 2015, Mayfly relocated to Montrose, Colorado where it exists today.

In 2017, Dragoo, along with the City of Montrose, initiated the Colorado Outdoors project, a 164-acre (66-hectare) mixed-use development in Montrose designed to attract businesses, many focused on outdoor recreation. The project integrates residential, commercial, and industrial spaces, with an emphasis on river conservation, sustainability and community development. The project is also part of the Montrose Urban Renewal Authority (MURA). Organizations in the project include manufacturers Shelter Distilling, and the Montrose Recreation District, as well as a Fairfield by Marriott hotel.

In 2026, Dragoo was appointed as a director of First Southwest Bank, a CDFI, headquartered in Durango, CO.

== River Restoration ==
One of Dragoo's projects is located along the Uncompahgre River, which underwent significant restoration as part of the redevelopment. The area later became a CPW designated Colorado Quality Waters. The river improvements received $800,000 in donations from Dragoo, and an additional $500,000 from the Colorado Water Conservation Board through the Colorado Watershed Restoration Program. The City of Montrose also received a $2M Great Outdoors Colorado grant for a new trail system along the river within the project.

== Economic Development ==
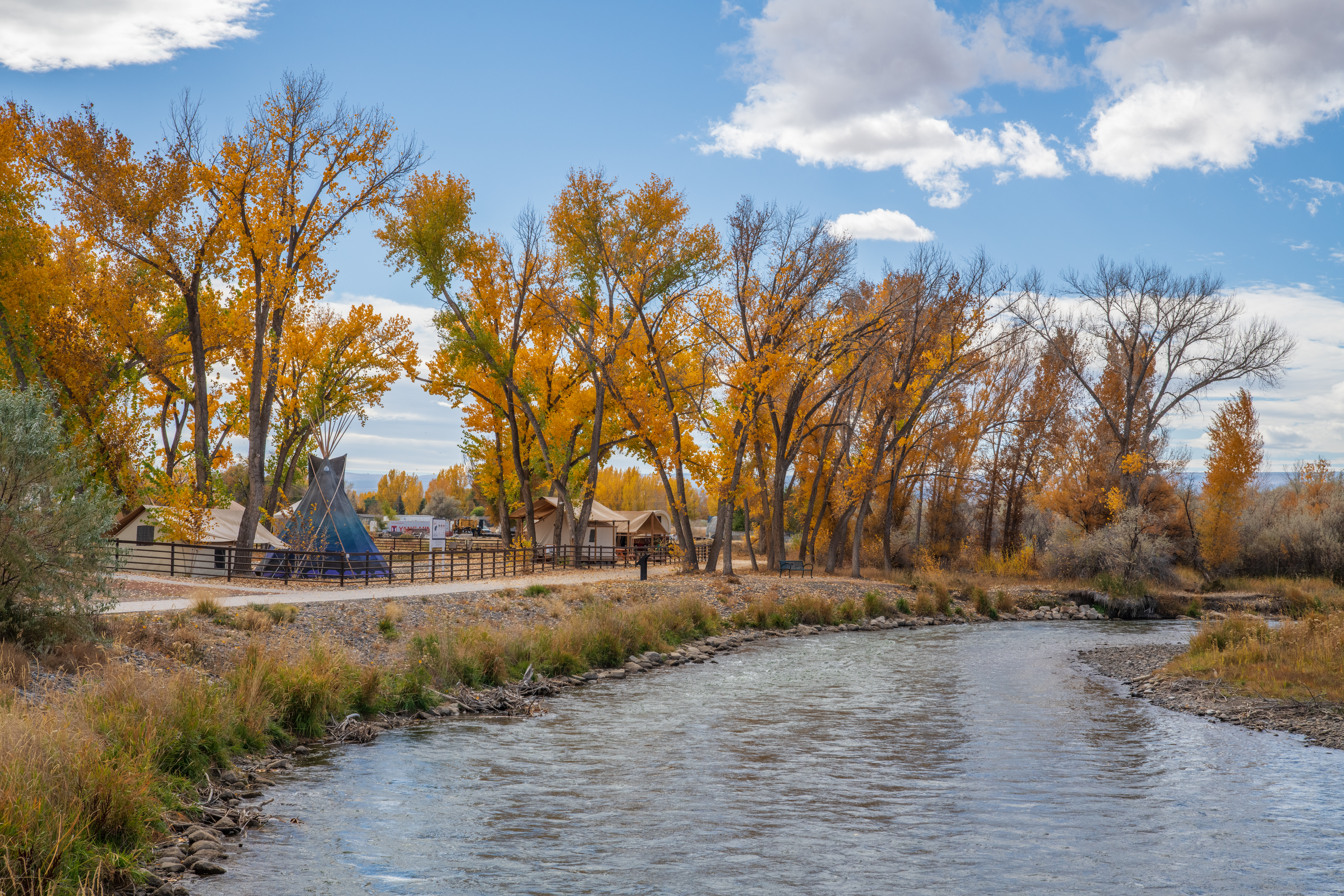

Dragoo's work in Colorado has been recognized for its contribution to Montrose's economic growth and diversification. In 2019, he was appointed to the Colorado Economic Development Commission by Colorado Senate President Leroy Garcia where he works with the Colorado Office of Economic Development and International Trade (OEDIT) to promote job creation and economic opportunities across the state. He has since been reappointed three times, most recently from James Coleman.

== See also ==
- Montrose, Colorado
- Economy of Colorado
