= Fetz-Keller Ranch =

- Fetz/Keller Ranch Headquarters
- U.S. National Register of Historic Places
- Location within Colorado Location within the United States
- Location: 61789, 61801 Colorado State Highway 90, near Montrose, Colorado
- Coordinates: 38°27′01″N 107°56′03″W
- Area: 2.7 acres (1.1 ha)
- Built: c.1888
- NRHP reference No.: 100004211 (original); 100007204 (increase)

Significant dates
- Added to NRHP: July 23, 2019
- Boundary increase: December 3, 2021

The Fetz-Keller Ranch Headquarters, in Montrose County, Colorado, United States, was listed on the National Register of Historic Places in 2019.

It was at its peak probably in the 1910s and 1920s.

It includes six contributing buildings and six contributing structures.

The main house, built around 1888, is a two-story 30 by 48 feet (9.1 m × 14.6 m) cross-gable wood-framed building, facing but well set back from Highway 90.

It was designated a Montrose County Historical Landmark on October 24, 2018.
