= Eberhard Fetz =

American neuroscientist, academic and researcher

Eberhard Erich Fetz
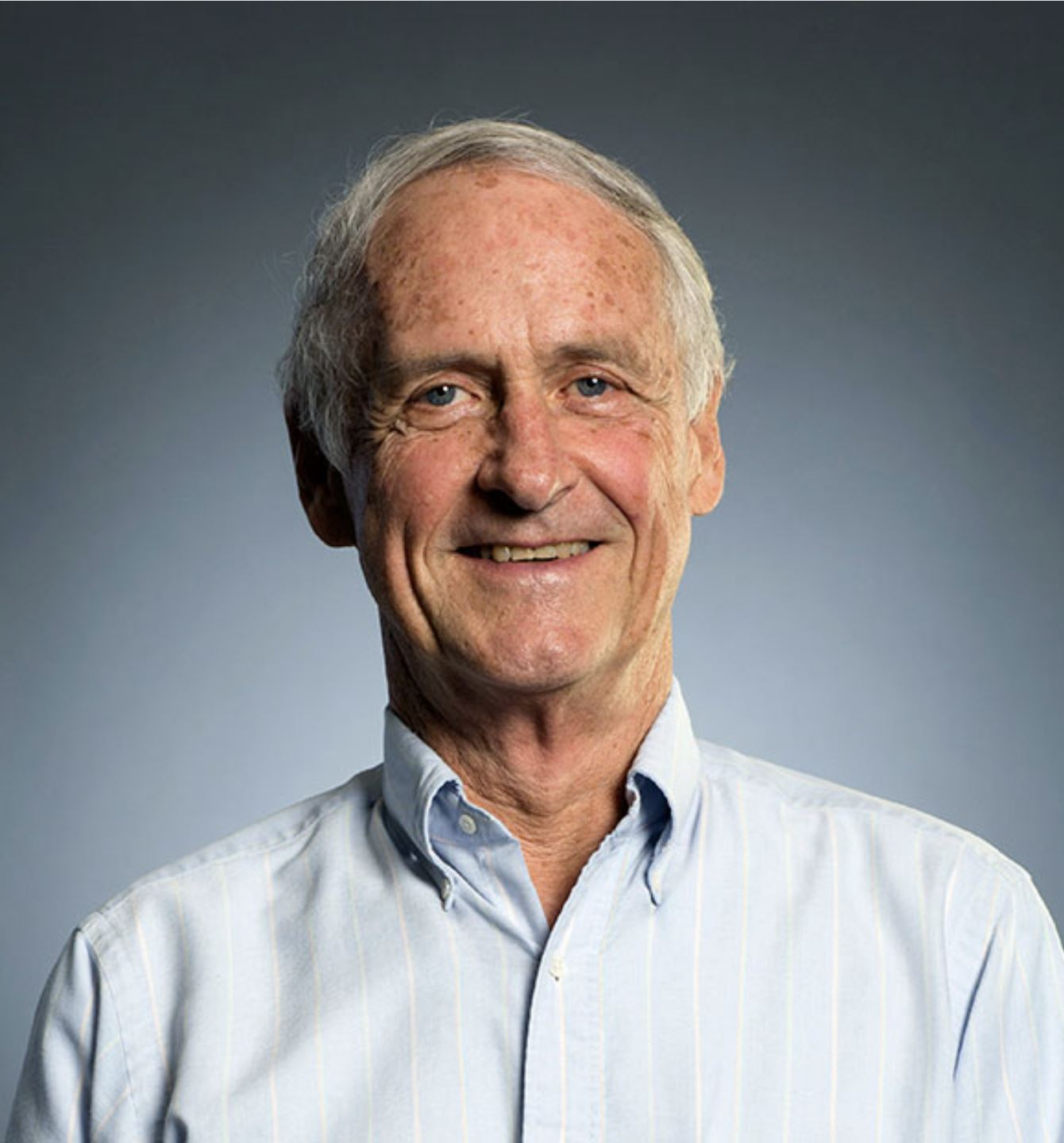
- Born: February 5, 1940 (age 86); Zwenkau, Germany
- Citizenship: American
- Occupations: Neuroscientist, academic and researcher
- Awards: Sloan Research Fellow; Humboldt Research Award; New York Academy of Sciences and Aspen Brain Forum First Prize in Neurotechnology; Fellow, AAAS

Academic background
- Education: B.S., Physics; Ph.D., Physics
- Alma mater: Rensselaer Polytechnic Institute; Massachusetts Institute of Technology
- Thesis: Pyramidal Tract Effects on Spinal Cord Interneurons.
- Doctoral advisor: Patrick David Wall

Eberhard Erich Fetz (born February 5, 1940) is an American neuroscientist, academic and researcher. He is a Professor Emeritus of Neurobiology and Biophysics and DXARTS at the University of Washington.

Fetz has authored over 160 papers on experimental neuroscience, brain-computer interfaces, and neural networks. His research focuses on the neural control of limb movement in primates. He pioneered the recording of cortical and spinal neurons in behaving monkeys and the applications of bidirectional brain-computer interfaces.

In 2020, Fetz was elected as a Fellow of the American Association for the Advancement of Science in Neuroscience.

== Education ==
Fetz received his B.S. in physics from Rensselaer Polytechnic Institute in 1961 and his doctoral degree in physics from the Massachusetts Institute of Technology in 1966. He completed his postdoctoral training in neuroscience at the Massachusetts Institute of Technology and University of Washington School of Medicine.

== Career ==
Fetz joined University of Washington School of Medicine as an assistant professor in 1969 and was promoted to associate professor in 1975. In 1980, he was promoted to professor of physiology and biophysics, and in 2019 he was appointed as professor of DXARTS at the university.

From 1999 till 2005, he served as associate director for neuroscience in the Washington National Primate Research Center and was appointed as head of the Neuroscience Division for a second time in 2012.

Fetz is a private pilot and has an active interest in art. Starting with a sabbatical at the Wissenschaftskolleg in Berlin in 2004-5 he has a particular interest in artistic explorations of mind-brain issues. He has created cyanotype and digital print collages and multimedia works.

== Research ==
Fetz has worked on experimental neuroscience, brain-computer interfaces, and neural networks. His research includes studies on monkeys’ ability to volitionally control the activity of motor cortex cells and muscles with biofeedback, neural mechanisms of a primate model of focal epilepsy, the functional organization of premotor cells controlling forearm muscles and synaptic interactions between neurons. His later research developed an autonomous head-fixed bidirectional brain-computer interface that induced synaptic plasticity.

=== Volitional control of motor cortex cells and muscles with biofeedback ===
Fetz studied the relation between motor cortex cells and forelimb muscles in behaving monkeys. He first investigated these relations by training monkeys to volitionally control the activity of brain cells and muscles with biofeedback. The results demonstrated an unexpected degree of flexibility in quickly generating different rewarded response patterns, including dissociating the activity of motor cortex cells and correlated muscles when the monkeys were rewarded for such dissociation. Feedback about the degree to which neural activity met criteria for reinforcement was provided through movement of a meter arm, and Fetz's studies were the first to demonstrate direct control of an external device through volitional modulation of brain cell activity, the precursor of present-day brain-computer interfaces.

=== Functional connections in motor system ===
Fetz's research developed ways to document both the normal activity and the output connectivity of premotor cells in behaving monkeys. Starting with corticomotoneuronal (CM) cells, he introduced the technique of spike-triggered averaging of muscle activity to document post-spike effects of premotor cells on motoneurons.

He showed that motor cortex cells with correlational linkages to muscles affected multiple synergistic muscles and causally contributed to generating muscle force. CM cells fired with specific movements involving their muscle field. In contrast, spinal cord premotor interneurons had smaller muscle fields and were active through broader ranges of movement.

=== Activity of spinal cord interneurons in behaving monkeys ===
Fetz's lab was the first to document the activity of cervical spinal cord interneurons in behaving monkeys. He studied the post-spike effects of premotor neurons on forelimb muscles and related their activity during controlled movements to their connectivity. When monkeys performed an instructed delay task, many spinal interneurons were related to preparation for the cued movement before it was executed.

Fetz and colleagues found that peripheral input to spinal cord is modulated by presynaptic inhibition of afferent sensory fibers, beginning prior to active movement. His work provided the first evidence for the functional roles of primate cervical spinal cord interneurons in performing active hand movements.

=== Synaptic interactions between neurons ===
Fetz's work has explained the synaptic interactions between cortical neurons using spike-triggered averages of intracellulary recorded membrane potentials and cross-correlation of pairs of cells related to hand movement. He documented the relationship between these two measures by determining the effects that excitatory postsynaptic potentials had on the firing rate of spinal motoneurons. In primate motor cortex spike-triggered averages of membrane potentials exhibit features representing post-spike excitatory and inhibitory unitary potentials as well as synchrony effects of population activity. He also investigated periodic synchronization in motor cortex through widespread oscillatory activity in neurons and field potentials.

=== Bidirectional interactions between the brain and implantable computers ===
Fetz has also conducted research on closed-loop interactions between the brain and implantable computers. He investigated the consequences of direct connections produced by an autonomous head-fixed bidirectional brain-computer interface [BBCI].

Fetz studied the applications of BBCI to bridging impaired biological connections, including cortically controlled electrical stimulation of paralyzed forearm muscles and cortically controlled intra-spinal stimulation. He found several applications of the closed-loop BBCI in producing Hebbian plasticity between cortical sites, through stimulation triggered from action potentials of cells or from phases of cortical beta oscillations recorded at neighboring sites, or from EMG activity of muscles. He and colleagues also strengthened cortico-spinal connections by cortically triggered intra-spinal stimulation, demonstrating in vivo effects of spike-timing dependent plasticity. A third application of the closed-loop BBCI was to deliver stimulation at an intracranial reward site contingent on neural activity, thereby operantly training monkeys to control neural activity during free behavior.

== Awards and honors ==
- 1970-1975 - NINDS Teacher-Investigator Award, National Institute of Neurological Disorders and Stroke
- 1972-1974 - Sloan Research Fellow
- 1977-1978 - Josiah Macy Faculty Scholar Award
- 1985-1986 - NSF US-Japan Cooperative Science Program Award
- 2004-2005 - Fellow, Wissenschaftskolleg zu Berlin
- 2008-2015 - Associate, Neurosciences Research Program
- 2009-2012 - Contributing member, Faculty of 1000
- 2010-2011 - Humboldt Research Award
- 2010 - New York Academy of Sciences and Aspen Brain Forum first Prize in Neurotechnology
- 2020 – Elected Fellow of American Association for the Advancement of Science

== Bibliography ==
=== Books ===
- Closing the Loop Around Neural Systems (2014) ISBN 9782889193561

=== Selected articles ===
- Fetz, Eberhard E. (December 1992). "Are movement parameters recognizably coded in the activity of single neurons?". Behavioral and Brain Sciences. 15 (4): 679–690.
- Fetz, Eberhard; Toyama, Keisuke; Smith, Wade (1991). "Synaptic Interactions between Cortical Neurons". Normal and Altered States of Function. Cerebral Cortex. Vol. 9. pp. 1–47. doi:10.1007/978-1-4615-6622-9_1. ISBN 978-1-4615-6624-3.
- Fetz, Eberhard E. (1993). "Dynamic Neural Network Models of Sensorimotor Behavior". Neurobiology of Neural Networks. pp. 165–190. doi:10.7551/mitpress/4941.003.0010. ISBN 978-0-262-29087-6.
- Fetz, Eberhard E. (2012). "Artistic explorations of the brain". Frontiers in Human Neuroscience. 6: 9. doi:10.3389/fnhum.2012.00009. PMC 3273889. PMID 22347178.
- Shupe, Larry; Fetz, Eberhard (March 2021). "An Integrate-and-Fire Spiking Neural Network Model Simulating Artificially Induced Cortical Plasticity". eNeuro. 8 (2): ENEURO.0333–20.2021. doi:10.1523/ENEURO.0333-20.2021. PMC 7986529. PMID 33632810.
