= Cimarron, Colorado =

Unincorporated community in Montrose County, CO, USA

- Unincorporated community
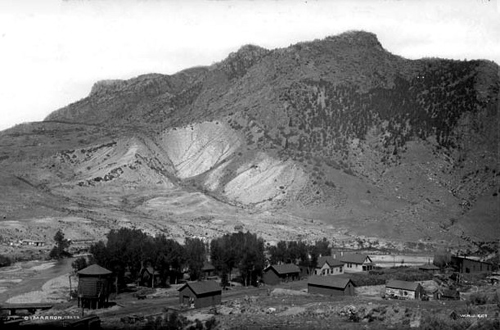
- In 1883

- Location within Colorado Location within the United States
- Coordinates: 38°26′33″N 107°33′24″W
- Country: United States
- State: Colorado
- County: Montrose
- Elevation: 6,897 ft (2,102 m)
- Time zone: UTC-7 (MST)
  - Summer (DST): UTC-6 (MDT)
- ZIP Code: 81220
- GNIS feature ID: 188168

Cimarron is an unincorporated community and U.S. Post Office in Montrose County, Colorado, United States. The Cimarron Post Office has the ZIP Code 81220.

Cimarron is located along the Cimarron River, just south of the Black Canyon of the Gunnison, and just outside Curecanti National Recreation Area. The D & RG Narrow Gauge Trestle crosses the Cimarron River gorge just northeast of town, and is on the National Register of Historic Places (#76000172).

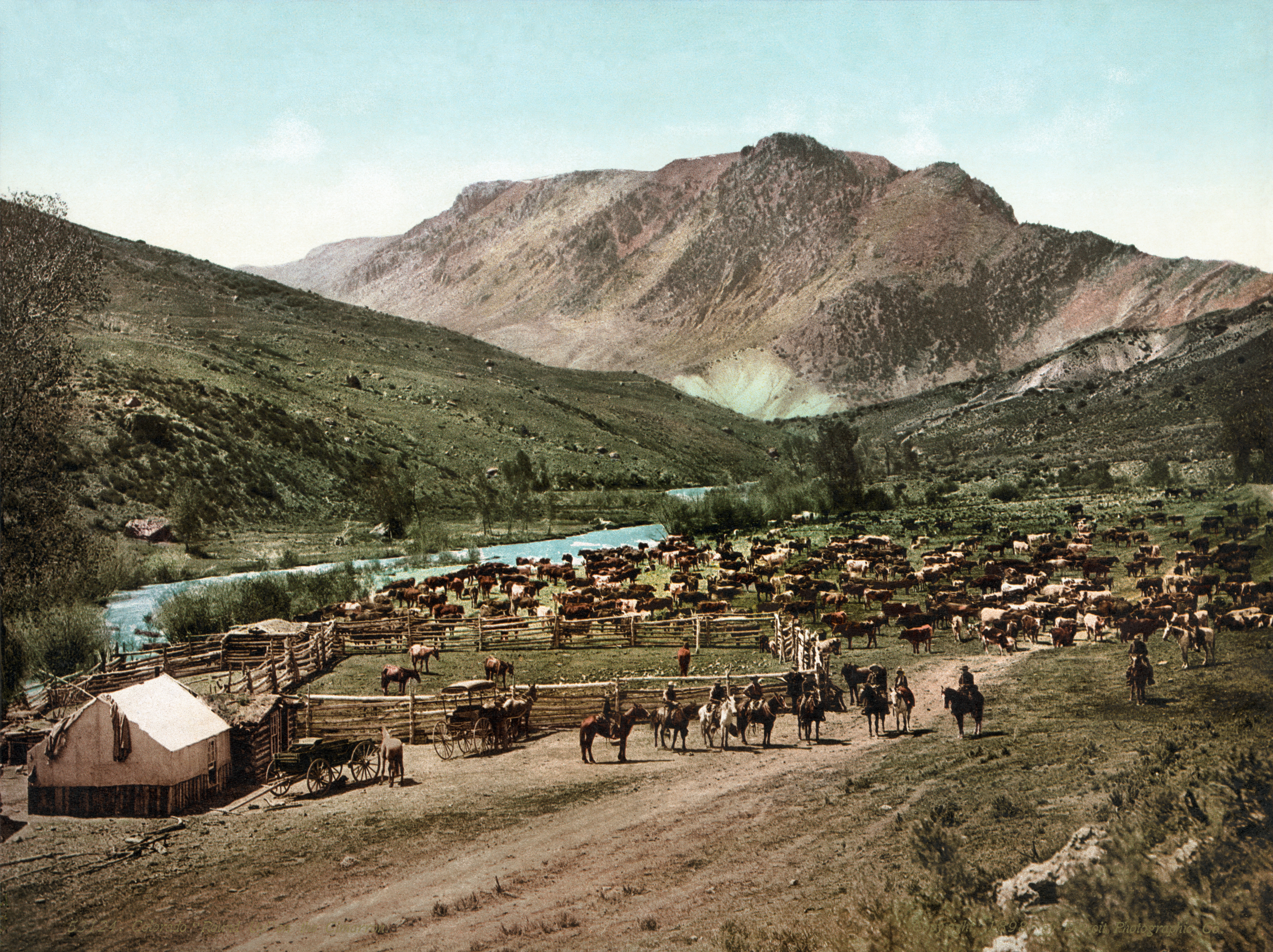
Round-up in a ranch just south of the town, 1898.

== Climate ==
Cimarron has a humid continental climate (Köppen Dfb), bordering on a cold semi-arid climate (Köppen BSk).

Climate data for Cimarron, Colorado, 1991–2020 normals, 1951-2020 records: 6890ft (2100m)
Month	Jan	Feb	Mar	Apr	May	Jun	Jul	Aug	Sep	Oct	Nov	Dec	Year
Record high °F (°C)	60 (16)	65 (18)	81 (27)	85 (29)	91 (33)	96 (36)	98 (37)	94 (34)	94 (34)	86 (30)	78 (26)	61 (16)	98 (37)
Mean maximum °F (°C)	47.6 (8.7)	51.8 (11.0)	65.0 (18.3)	73.1 (22.8)	81.7 (27.6)	88.9 (31.6)	92.3 (33.5)	89.8 (32.1)	86.1 (30.1)	77.5 (25.3)	64.7 (18.2)	50.7 (10.4)	92.7 (33.7)
Mean daily maximum °F (°C)	34.8 (1.6)	39.6 (4.2)	51.0 (10.6)	60.0 (15.6)	70.2 (21.2)	80.9 (27.2)	85.5 (29.7)	83.0 (28.3)	76.3 (24.6)	64.3 (17.9)	48.7 (9.3)	35.9 (2.2)	60.9 (16.0)
Daily mean °F (°C)	18.8 (−7.3)	24.7 (−4.1)	34.8 (1.6)	43.0 (6.1)	51.1 (10.6)	59.2 (15.1)	65.4 (18.6)	63.8 (17.7)	56.4 (13.6)	45.0 (7.2)	32.5 (0.3)	21.0 (−6.1)	43.0 (6.1)
Mean daily minimum °F (°C)	2.7 (−16.3)	9.8 (−12.3)	18.6 (−7.4)	26.1 (−3.3)	32.0 (0.0)	37.5 (3.1)	45.3 (7.4)	44.6 (7.0)	36.5 (2.5)	25.7 (−3.5)	16.4 (−8.7)	6.0 (−14.4)	25.1 (−3.8)
Mean minimum °F (°C)	−18.4 (−28.0)	−15.1 (−26.2)	−1.4 (−18.6)	12.0 (−11.1)	20.1 (−6.6)	27.5 (−2.5)	34.6 (1.4)	34.3 (1.3)	23.2 (−4.9)	10.6 (−11.9)	−4.8 (−20.4)	−17.6 (−27.6)	−23.9 (−31.1)
Record low °F (°C)	−43 (−42)	−40 (−40)	−26 (−32)	−9 (−23)	4 (−16)	19 (−7)	29 (−2)	27 (−3)	13 (−11)	−8 (−22)	−24 (−31)	−33 (−36)	−43 (−42)
Average precipitation inches (mm)	1.09 (28)	0.94 (24)	0.91 (23)	1.22 (31)	1.28 (33)	0.68 (17)	1.37 (35)	1.41 (36)	1.82 (46)	1.35 (34)	1.04 (26)	1.17 (30)	14.28 (363)
Average snowfall inches (cm)	14.50 (36.8)	11.60 (29.5)	8.20 (20.8)	5.70 (14.5)	1.10 (2.8)	0.00 (0.00)	0.00 (0.00)	0.00 (0.00)	0.00 (0.00)	1.40 (3.6)	9.70 (24.6)	14.50 (36.8)	66.7 (169.4)
Source 1: NOAA
Source 2: XMACIS2 (records & monthly max/mins)

Montrose 11 ENE is a weather station near Cimarron. Montrose 11 ENE also has a humid continental climate (Köppen Dfb), but with a lower diurnal variation and a higher level of precipitation.

Climate data for Montrose 11 ENE, Colorado, 1991–2020 normals, 2004-2020 snowfall: 8402ft (2561m)
Month	Jan	Feb	Mar	Apr	May	Jun	Jul	Aug	Sep	Oct	Nov	Dec	Year
Record high °F (°C)	50 (10)	55 (13)	68 (20)	73 (23)	79 (26)	88 (31)	89 (32)	87 (31)	85 (29)	76 (24)	64 (18)	52 (11)	89 (32)
Mean maximum °F (°C)	43.6 (6.4)	46.1 (7.8)	56.5 (13.6)	66.5 (19.2)	73.9 (23.3)	82.4 (28.0)	85.1 (29.5)	83.0 (28.3)	79.0 (26.1)	69.4 (20.8)	59.8 (15.4)	46.5 (8.1)	85.6 (29.8)
Mean daily maximum °F (°C)	31.1 (−0.5)	34.1 (1.2)	41.9 (5.5)	50.4 (10.2)	61.4 (16.3)	72.2 (22.3)	77.7 (25.4)	75.2 (24.0)	67.2 (19.6)	55.0 (12.8)	41.5 (5.3)	31.0 (−0.6)	53.2 (11.8)
Daily mean °F (°C)	22.6 (−5.2)	25.6 (−3.6)	32.5 (0.3)	39.7 (4.3)	49.6 (9.8)	59.7 (15.4)	65.3 (18.5)	63.1 (17.3)	55.4 (13.0)	43.9 (6.6)	32.4 (0.2)	22.8 (−5.1)	42.7 (6.0)
Mean daily minimum °F (°C)	14.2 (−9.9)	17.1 (−8.3)	23.1 (−4.9)	29.0 (−1.7)	37.9 (3.3)	47.2 (8.4)	53.0 (11.7)	51.0 (10.6)	43.7 (6.5)	32.9 (0.5)	23.3 (−4.8)	14.6 (−9.7)	32.3 (0.1)
Mean minimum °F (°C)	−1.3 (−18.5)	0.6 (−17.4)	7.1 (−13.8)	13.9 (−10.1)	25.5 (−3.6)	35.3 (1.8)	45.8 (7.7)	44.2 (6.8)	31.9 (−0.1)	16.2 (−8.8)	5.5 (−14.7)	−2.5 (−19.2)	−6.8 (−21.6)
Record low °F (°C)	−12 (−24)	−18 (−28)	−1 (−18)	6 (−14)	18 (−8)	30 (−1)	39 (4)	39 (4)	22 (−6)	−4 (−20)	−7 (−22)	−10 (−23)	−18 (−28)
Average precipitation inches (mm)	1.67 (42)	1.70 (43)	2.18 (55)	2.58 (66)	1.81 (46)	0.63 (16)	1.19 (30)	1.83 (46)	2.11 (54)	1.92 (49)	1.81 (46)	1.73 (44)	21.16 (537)
Average snowfall inches (cm)	18.2 (46)	21.4 (54)	17.6 (45)	11.7 (30)	4.8 (12)	0.1 (0.25)	0.0 (0.0)	0.0 (0.0)	0.6 (1.5)	4.7 (12)	13.0 (33)	24.2 (61)	116.3 (294.75)
Source 1: NOAA
Source 2: XMACIS2 (Black Canyon snowfall, records & monthly max/mins)

== See also ==
- Cimarron River
