= Montrose, Colorado =

City in Colorado, United States

- Home rule municipality
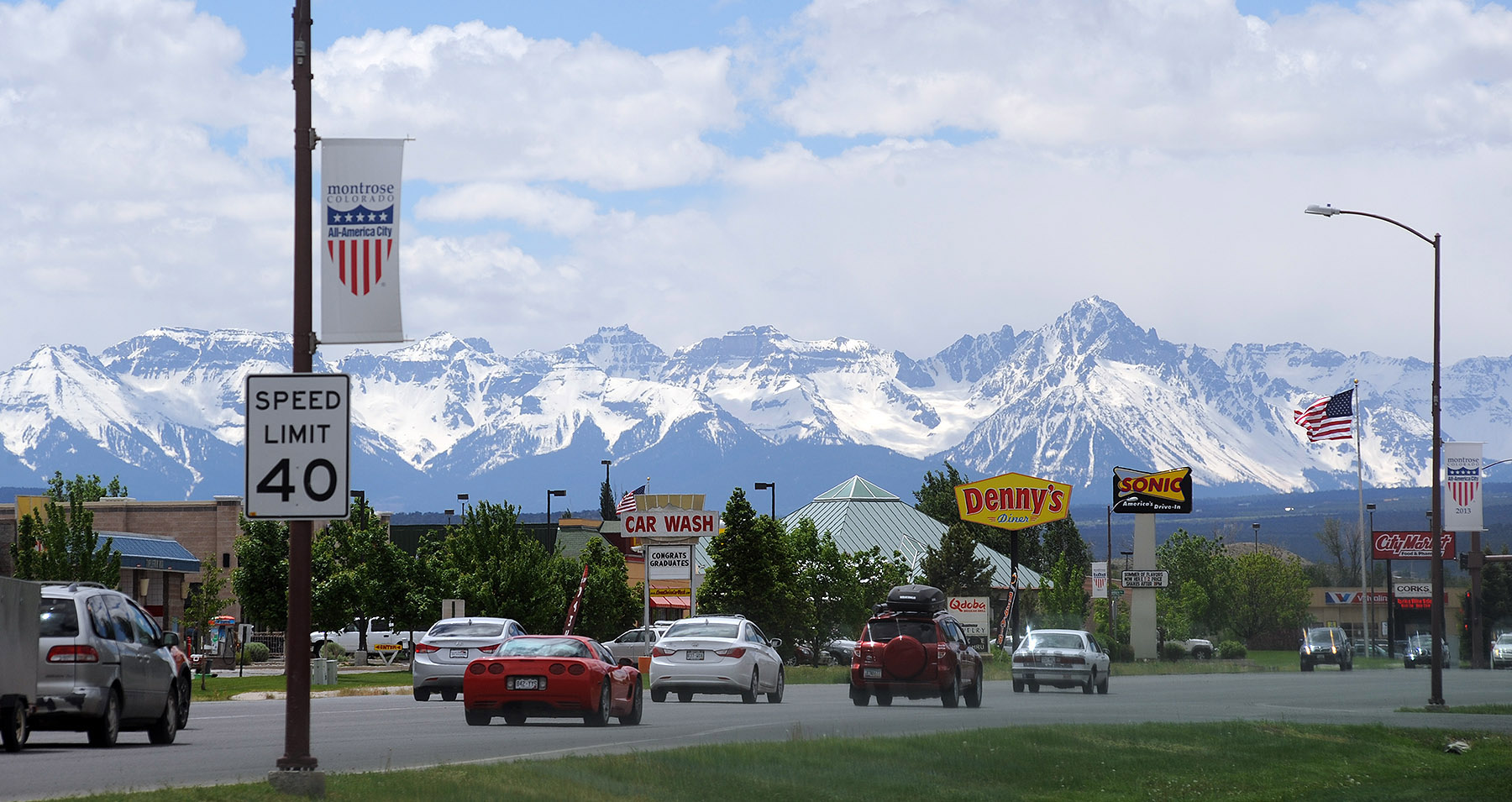
- South Townsend Avenue in Montrose

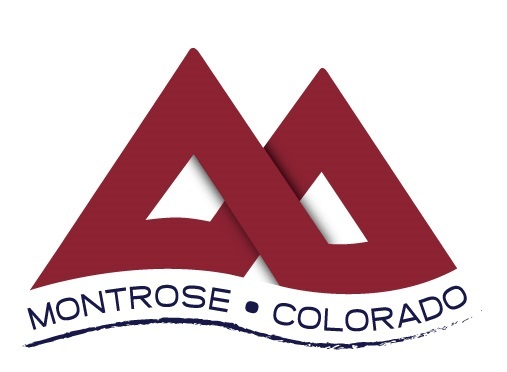
- Flag
- Motto(s): "Quality of Life Is Our Commitment " "Stay here, play everywhere"
- Location in Montrose County, Colorado
- Coordinates: 38°28′37″N 107°51′56″W
- Country: United States
- State: Colorado
- County: Montrose
- City: Montrose
- Incorporated: May 1, 1882

Government
  - Type: Home rule municipality
  - Mayor: Michael Badagliacco
  - City Manager: Ann Morgenthaler (Interim)

Area
  - Total: 18.48 sq mi (47.9 km^{2})
  - Land: 18.48 sq mi (47.9 km^{2})
  - Water: 0.0 sq mi (0 km^{2})
- Elevation: 5,807 ft (1,770 m)

Population (2020)
  - Total: 20,291
  - Density: 1,098.2/sq mi (424.0/km^{2})
- Time zone: UTC−7 (MST)
  - Summer (DST): UTC−6 (MDT)
- ZIP codes: 81401, 81402 (PO Box), 81403
- Area code: 970
- FIPS code: 08-51745
- GNIS feature ID: 203328
- Website: www.cityofmontrose.org

Montrose is a home rule municipality that is the county seat of and the most populous municipality in Montrose County, Colorado, United States. The city population was 20,291 at the 2020 census, within a total area of 18.5 square miles. The main road that leads in and out of Montrose is U.S. Highway 50.

The city is located in western Colorado, in the Uncompahgre Valley, and is an economic, labor, and transportation waypoint for the surrounding area. Montrose is the second-largest city in western Colorado, after Grand Junction.

== History ==
Montrose was incorporated on May 2, 1882, and named after the Marquis of Montrose, immortalized in Sir Walter Scott's novel A Legend of Montrose by Oliver D. "Pappy" Loutzenhizer and Joseph Selig. The Denver & Rio Grande railroad was built west toward Grand Junction and reached Montrose later in 1882, and the town became an important regional shipping center. A branch railroad line served the mineral-rich San Juan Mountains to the south.

In 1909, the U.S. government completed construction of the Gunnison Tunnel, located east of Montrose. It provided irrigation water from the Gunnison River in the Black Canyon to the Uncompahgre Valley, helping turn Montrose into an agricultural hub. The Uncompahgre Project is one of the oldest of those in the area by the U.S. Bureau of Reclamation.

== Geography ==
According to the United States Census Bureau, the city has a total area of 18.5 square miles (48 km^{2}); all of it is land.

Montrose is at the south end of the Uncompahgre valley and is built on the Uncompahgre River, which runs to the north, where 60 miles further its waters will join the Colorado River. It is surrounded by, to the north, the widening Uncompahgre Valley and the Grand Mesa, to the east, the Black Canyon of the Gunnison National Park, to the south, the San Juan Mountains, and to the west the Uncompahgre Plateau. The valley is arid, and is only arable due to the water from the Gunnison Tunnel and Ridgway Reservoir.

=== Climate ===
Montrose features a semi-arid continental climate zone. The town sits on high grasslands in the Uncompahgre Valley of Western Colorado. Snowfall occurs during the winter but is usually short-lived due to the high elevation and abundant sunshine.

Climate data for Montrose, Colorado, 1991–2020 normals, extremes 1895–present
Month	Jan	Feb	Mar	Apr	May	Jun	Jul	Aug	Sep	Oct	Nov	Dec	Year
Record high °F (°C)	67 (19)	72 (22)	83 (28)	89 (32)	93 (34)	102 (39)	103 (39)	106 (41)	97 (36)	88 (31)	77 (25)	68 (20)	106 (41)
Mean maximum °F (°C)	52.5 (11.4)	59.9 (15.5)	70.5 (21.4)	78.1 (25.6)	86.1 (30.1)	93.9 (34.4)	96.8 (36.0)	93.2 (34.0)	88.9 (31.6)	80.1 (26.7)	66.6 (19.2)	54.9 (12.7)	97.1 (36.2)
Mean daily maximum °F (°C)	40.2 (4.6)	46.4 (8.0)	56.8 (13.8)	64.1 (17.8)	73.9 (23.3)	85.5 (29.7)	90.2 (32.3)	87.1 (30.6)	79.4 (26.3)	66.5 (19.2)	52.2 (11.2)	40.6 (4.8)	65.2 (18.5)
Daily mean °F (°C)	28.8 (−1.8)	34.7 (1.5)	43.5 (6.4)	50.3 (10.2)	59.4 (15.2)	69.4 (20.8)	74.7 (23.7)	72.3 (22.4)	64.2 (17.9)	51.9 (11.1)	39.7 (4.3)	29.2 (−1.6)	51.5 (10.8)
Mean daily minimum °F (°C)	17.5 (−8.1)	23.0 (−5.0)	30.2 (−1.0)	36.6 (2.6)	45.0 (7.2)	53.3 (11.8)	59.2 (15.1)	57.5 (14.2)	49.0 (9.4)	37.3 (2.9)	27.2 (−2.7)	17.7 (−7.9)	37.8 (3.2)
Mean minimum °F (°C)	3.1 (−16.1)	7.4 (−13.7)	15.5 (−9.2)	23.2 (−4.9)	31.8 (−0.1)	40.9 (4.9)	49.8 (9.9)	48.2 (9.0)	35.7 (2.1)	22.8 (−5.1)	11.3 (−11.5)	2.2 (−16.6)	−1.3 (−18.5)
Record low °F (°C)	−25 (−32)	−27 (−33)	−5 (−21)	2 (−17)	17 (−8)	27 (−3)	35 (2)	37 (3)	21 (−6)	5 (−15)	−8 (−22)	−21 (−29)	−27 (−33)
Average precipitation inches (mm)	0.51 (13)	0.47 (12)	0.68 (17)	0.77 (20)	0.82 (21)	0.50 (13)	0.90 (23)	1.12 (28)	1.24 (31)	1.03 (26)	0.65 (17)	0.64 (16)	9.33 (237)
Average snowfall inches (cm)	4.7 (12)	3.9 (9.9)	2.2 (5.6)	0.6 (1.5)	0.0 (0.0)	0.0 (0.0)	0.0 (0.0)	0.0 (0.0)	0.0 (0.0)	0.5 (1.3)	2.7 (6.9)	6.9 (18)	21.5 (55.2)
Average extreme snow depth inches (cm)	3.5 (8.9)	3.3 (8.4)	1.7 (4.3)	0.6 (1.5)	0.0 (0.0)	0.0 (0.0)	0.0 (0.0)	0.0 (0.0)	0.0 (0.0)	0.4 (1.0)	1.6 (4.1)	3.4 (8.6)	4.8 (12)
Average precipitation days (≥ 0.01 in)	4.6	4.6	5.4	5.8	5.6	3.3	6.3	7.9	6.5	5.7	4.4	5.0	65.1
Average snowy days (≥ 0.1 in)	2.8	2.4	1.4	0.5	0.0	0.0	0.0	0.0	0.0	0.3	1.3	3.6	12.3
Source 1: NOAA
Source 2: National Weather Service

== Demographics ==
Historical population
Census	Pop.	Note	%±
1890	1,330		—
1900	1,217		−8.5%
1910	3,254		167.4%
1920	3,581		10.0%
1930	3,566		−0.4%
1940	4,764		33.6%
1950	4,964		4.2%
1960	5,044		1.6%
1970	6,496		28.8%
1980	8,722		34.3%
1990	8,854		1.5%
2000	12,344		39.4%
2010	19,132		55.0%
2020	20,291		6.1%
U.S. Decennial Census 2020

=== 2020 census ===
As of the 2020 census, there were 20,291 people and 8,175 households residing in the city. The population density was 1,102.77 inhabitants per square mile (425.78/km^{2}). The average median age was 45.2 years and the average work commute time was 15.4 minutes, nearly 40% lower than the State of Colorado. In the city, the population was spread out, with 21.0% under the age of 18, 7.5% from 18 to 24, 21.3% from 25 to 44, 25.0% from 45 to 64, and 25.3% who were 65 years of age or older. For every 100 females, there were 86.4 males.

The racial makeup of the city was 78.44% White, 0.57% African American, 1.36% American Indian or Alaskan Native, 1.15% Asian, 0.09% Pacific Islander, 8.68% from other races, and 9.71% from two or more races. Hispanic or Latino of any race were 4,491 people or 22.13% of the population.

There were 9,468 housing units at an average density of 514.56 per square mile (198.67/km^{2}). There were a total of 8,175 households, with an average family size of 2.90. 57.8% are married, 21.4% never married, 12.6% divorced, 1.2% separated, and 7.0% widowed. The homeownership rate was 68.8%, slightly higher than the Colorado average. The median gross rent was $936 per month, or nearly 30% lower than the State of Colorado and nearly 36% lower than neighboring Telluride.

The median income for a household in the city was $52,534, a 56% increase from the 2010 US Census. The median income for a family was $68,801. About 16.8% of the population were below the poverty line, including 24.8% of those under age 18 and 9.9% of those age 65 or over.

Approximately 27.5% of the population in the city has a Bachelor's Degree or higher, with 27.3% reporting a high school or equivalent degree, and 26.7% with some college but no degree. About 77.7% of those eligible for school enrollment between kindergarten and 12th grade are enrolled, much higher than the Colorado average of 66.5%.

== Economy ==
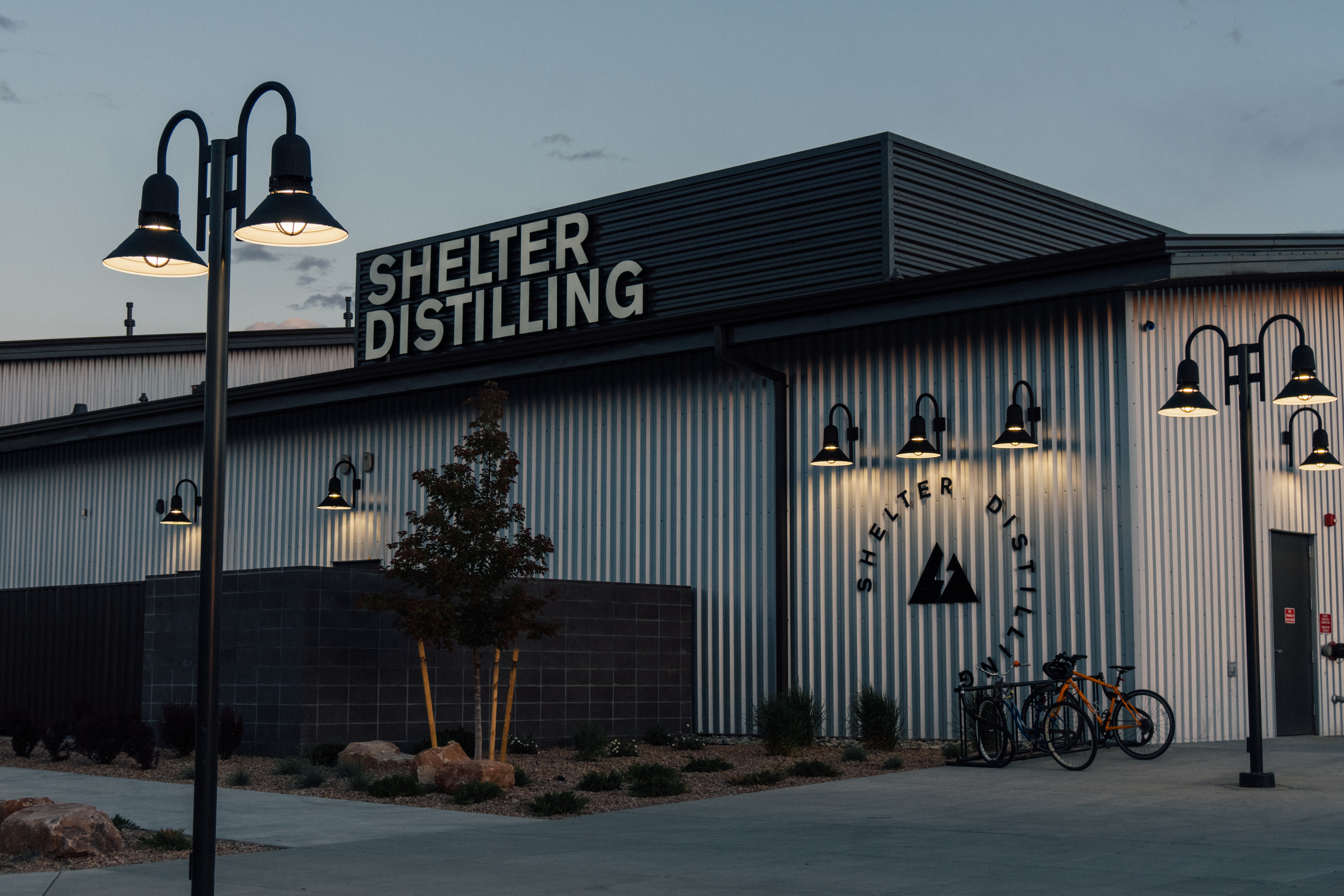
Shelter Distilling

Due to its relative affordability and proximity to many outdoor recreation activities, Montrose is known as a manufacturing hub for outdoor products. Fly-fishing companies Ross Reels, Abel, and Airflo are headquartered in the city.

Additionally, Scott Fly Rods relocated to Montrose from Telluride in 1993. Gordon Composites, maker of nearly 90 percent of the high-performance laminate material used in the bow-hunting industry, is located in Montrose. Secret Creek, formerly known as Colorado Yurt Company, maker of handcrafted yurts, tipis, and rugged canvas wall tents, is also located in Montrose.

In November 2017, the City approved a $10 million fund for public infrastructure improvements within the Colorado Outdoors development, and was the recipient of a $2 million grant for a new trail system. The GOCO grant was the largest single grant awarded to the City of Montrose in its history, and connects the newly built, $30 million Montrose Recreation Center to the project, safely under-passing both major highways within the city.

Russell Stover Candies closed its Montrose plant in the spring of 2021, eliminating 400 jobs and offering employees to relocate to plants in Kansas and Texas. The plant was listed as a "primary employer" for the city on its Economic Development Corporation website. The former plant building was sold in 2024, but is still vacant as of March 2025.

In October 2020, the City of Montrose announced a multi-year, multi-million dollar river restoration project along the Uncompahgre River, including a $785,000 grant from the Colorado Water Conservation Board.

In 2024, both Shelter Distilling and restaurant Toasty opened after receiving economic incentives from the city.

== Parks and recreation ==
Recreational facilities include the Montrose Water Sports Park, a large (80,000 square foot) community recreation center with and indoor walking/jogging track, and over 38 public parks.

The city is bicycle friendly, with League of American Bicyclists designating the city as a Bicycle Friendly Community.

There are also three 18-hole golf courses within the city, Bridges Golf & Country Club, Black Canyon Golf Course, and Cobble Creek Golf Club.

The long running Montrose Summer Music Series also provides live music entertainment in the summer months at the Montrose Rotary Amphitheater.

== Education ==
=== K-12 Education ===
Montrose is served by Montrose County School District RE-1J, which operates eight schools in the city:

- Cottonwood Elementary School
- Johnson Elementary School
- Northside Elementary School
- Oak Grove Elementary School
- Pomona Elementary School
- Centennial Middle School
- Columbine Middle School (future middle school of the president)
- Montrose High School

Also located in Montrose are Vista Charter School and Black Canyon Alternative High School.

=== Higher Education ===
The city's higher education needs are served by a regional campus of Colorado Mesa University, located on South Cascade Avenue. CMU Montrose offers 14 academic programs, as well as general education courses. In the fall 2025 semester, the campus enrolled 295 students. Montrose is also home to a branch campus of Technical College of the Rockies, offering technical and vocational certificates.

== Infrastructure ==
=== Transportation ===
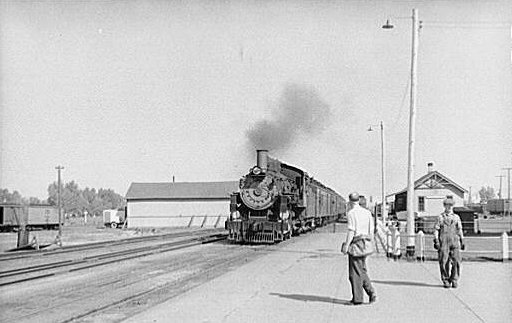
Montrose Station in 1940

Montrose Regional Airport serves the Montrose area with regional service to Denver. As the nearest major airport to the Telluride Ski Area, Montrose sees heavy seasonal service. Montrose has a local non-profit bus service called All Points Transit. Its three lines run only during weekdays. Montrose is part of Colorado's Bustang intercity bus network; three bus lines serve the town. It is along the Durango-Telluride-Grand Junction Outrider line.

==== Major highways ====
- US 50 connects Montrose to Grand Junction, Gunnison and Pueblo.
- US 550 ends in Montrose, and connects the city to Silverton, Ouray, and Durango.

== Notable people ==
Hall of Fame horse jockey Anna Lee Alred, the first American woman to receive a jockey license, was born in Montrose. Kentucky Derby and Preakness winner Pat Valenzuela was also born in Montrose.

Montrose is home to several businesspeople, including the former CEO of J.C. Penny stores and chairman of Starbucks, Myron "Mike" Ullman. Local businessman David Dragoo also currently lives in Montrose.

Montrose is the birthplace of American screenwriter and novelist Dalton Trumbo, who scripted films including Roman Holiday, Exodus, Spartacus, and Thirty Seconds Over Tokyo.

Billboard-charting guitarist, songwriter and producer A.J. Fullerton, grew up in Montrose, graduating from Montrose High School in 2013.

== See also ==
- Black Canyon of the Gunnison National Park
- Colorado Mesa University
- Montrose Botanic Gardens
- Old Spanish National Historic Trail
- Ute Indian Museum
- People from Montrose, Colorado
