= List of protected areas of Colorado =

Coordinates: 38.9972°N 105.5478°W

The location of the State of Colorado in the United States of America.

This is a list of protected areas in the U.S. State of Colorado.

== Federal lands ==
The United States federal government owns 36.23% of Colorado's total land area.

=== National Park System ===
The National Park System includes 23 areas in Colorado. The National Park Service manages 18 of these 23 areas plus five National Wildernesses.

==== National Parks ====
The four National Parks within Colorado are:

- Black Canyon of the Gunnison National Park near Montrose
- Great Sand Dunes National Park and Preserve near Mosca
- Mesa Verde National Park and UNESCO World Heritage Site near Cortez
- Rocky Mountain National Park near Estes Park and Grand Lake
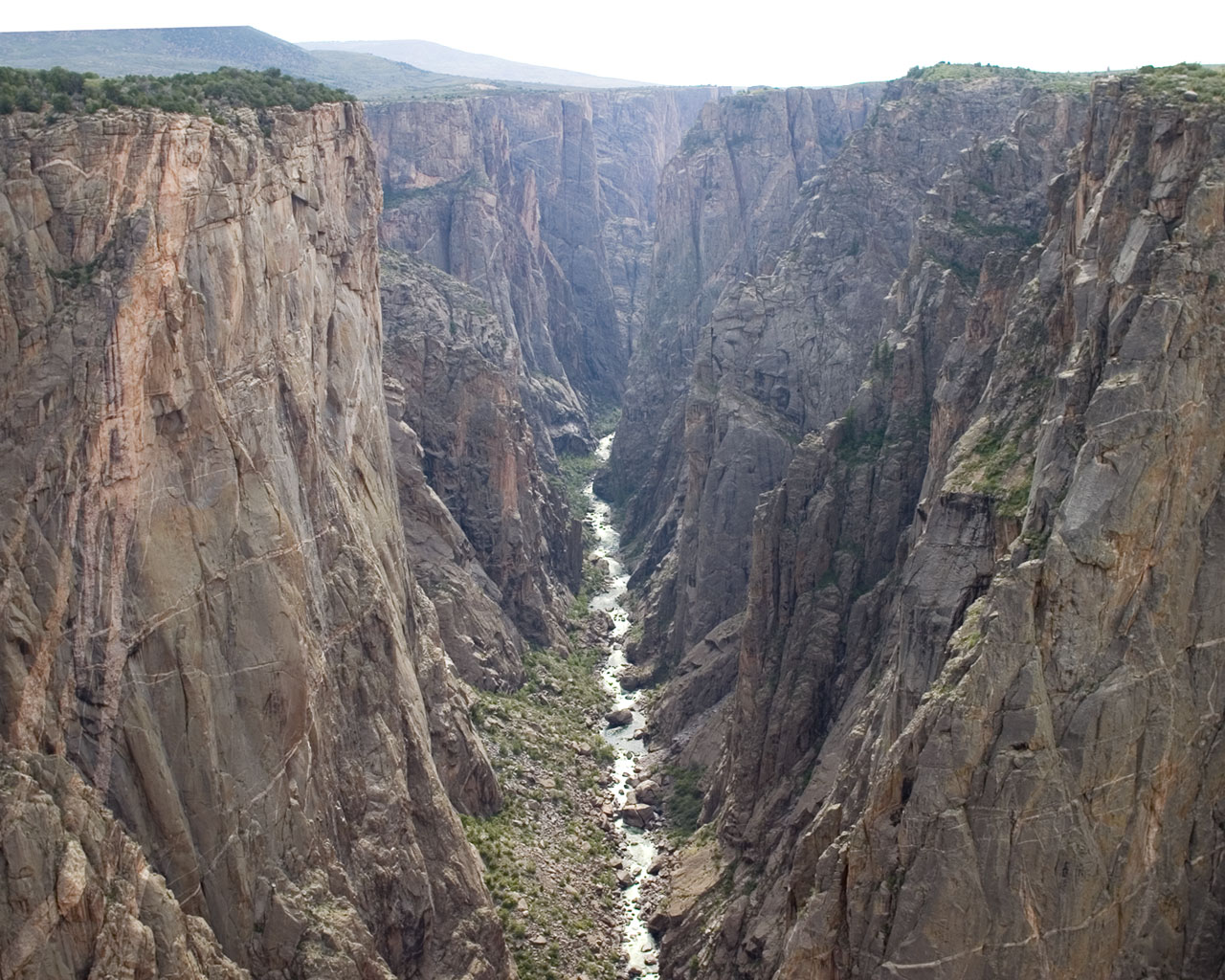
Black Canyon of the Gunnison National Park.

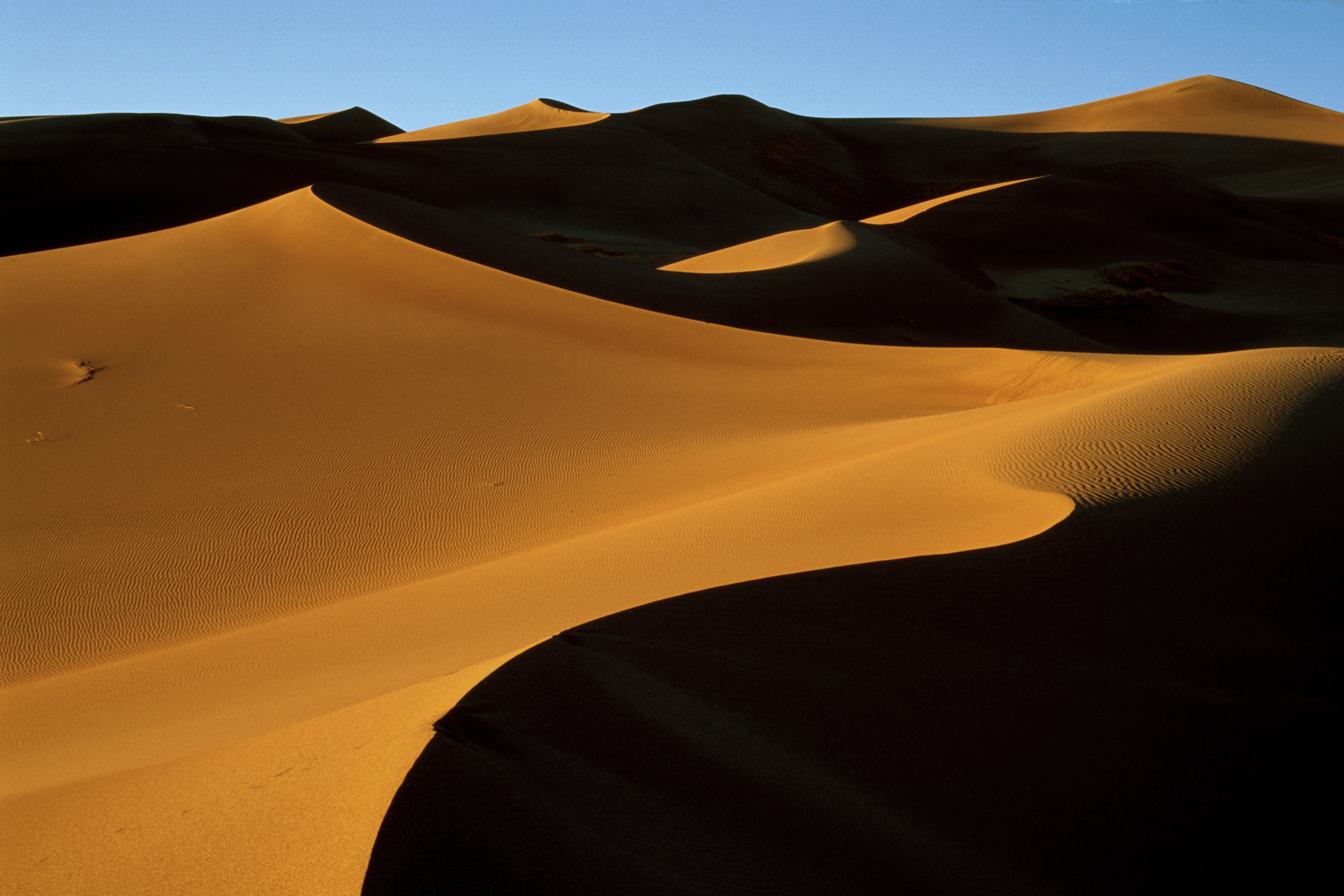
Great Sand Dunes National Park and Preserve.

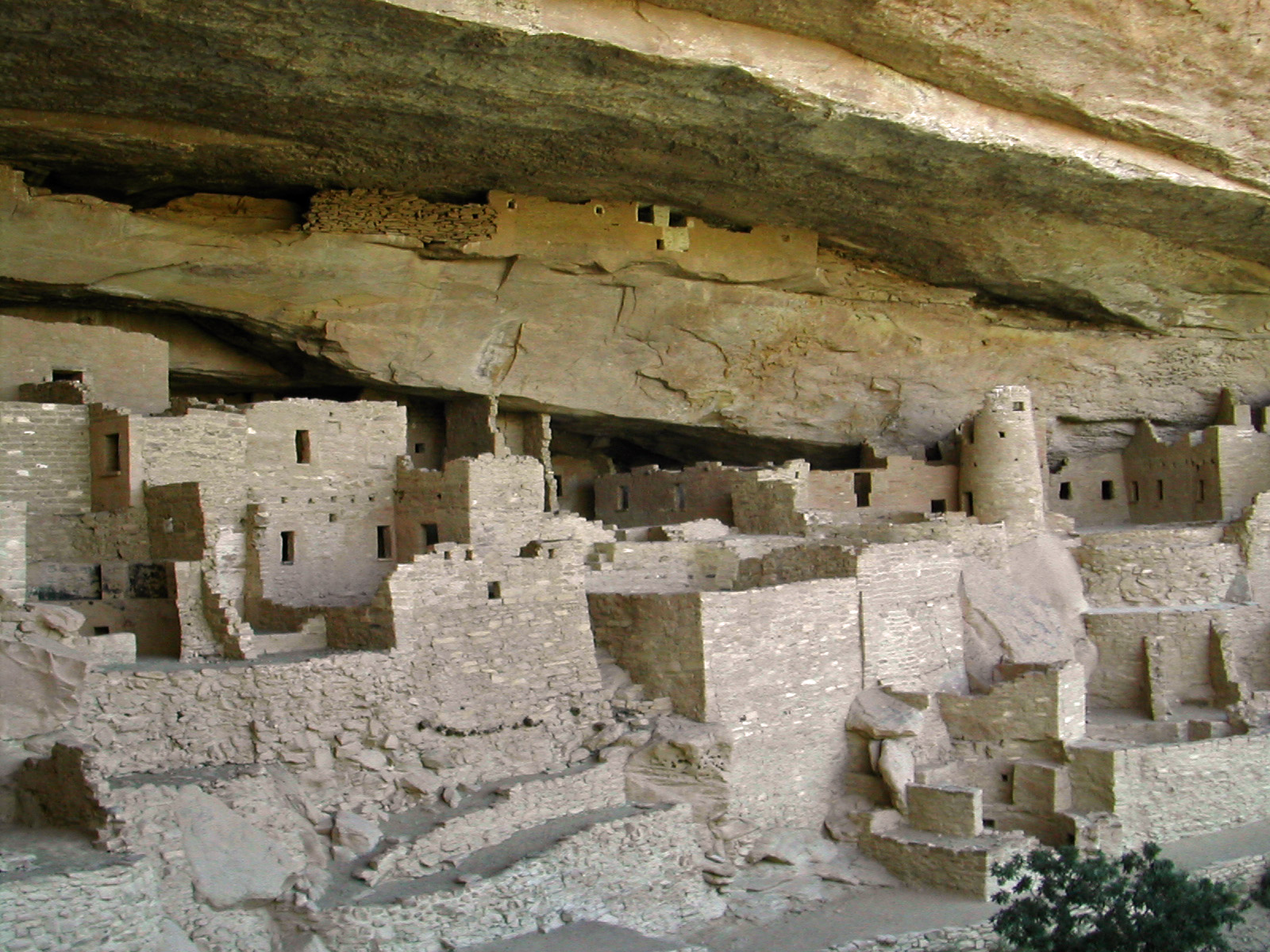
The Cliff Palace in Mesa Verde National Park.

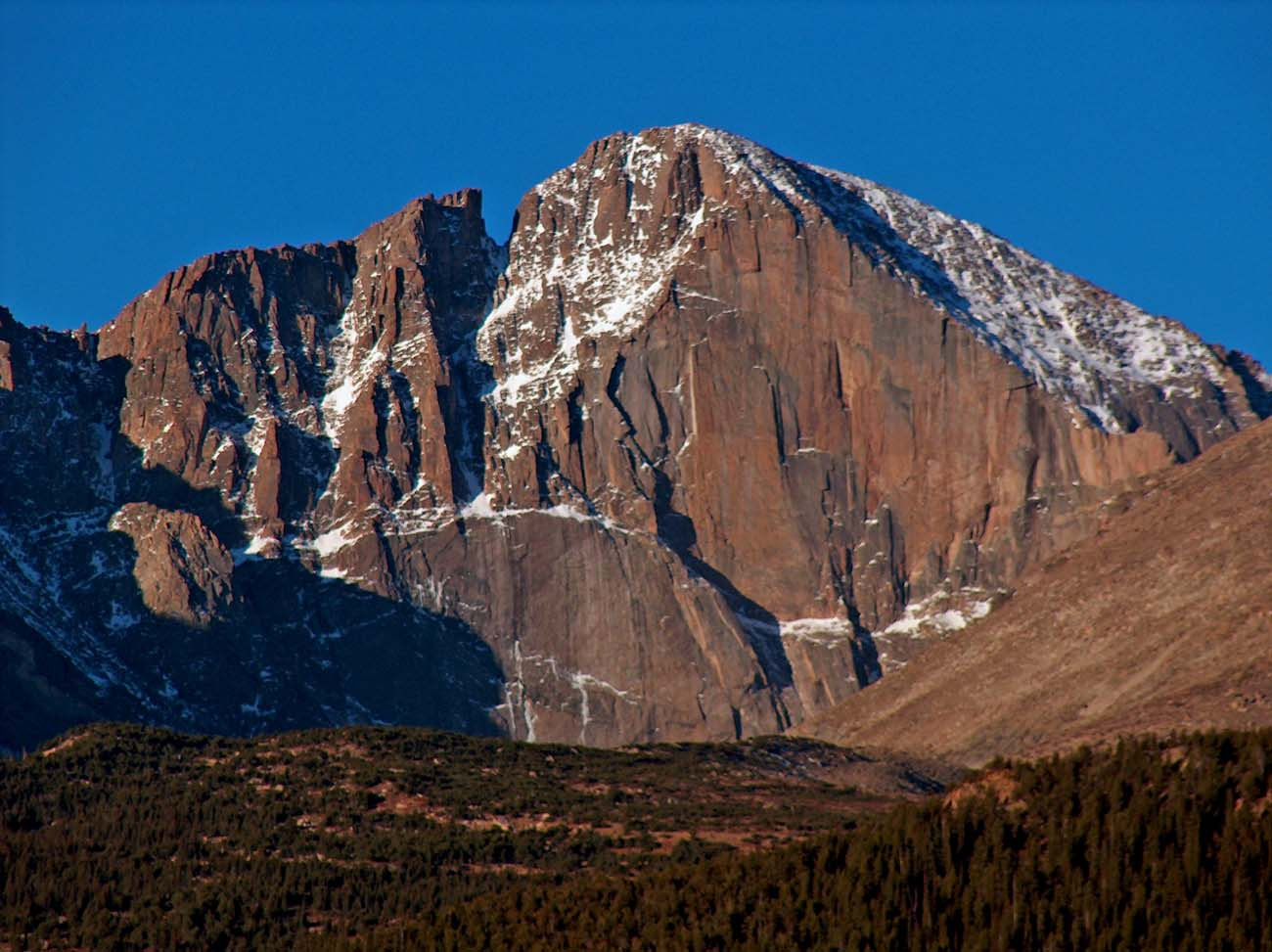
Longs Peak in Rocky Mountain National Park.

==== National Monuments ====
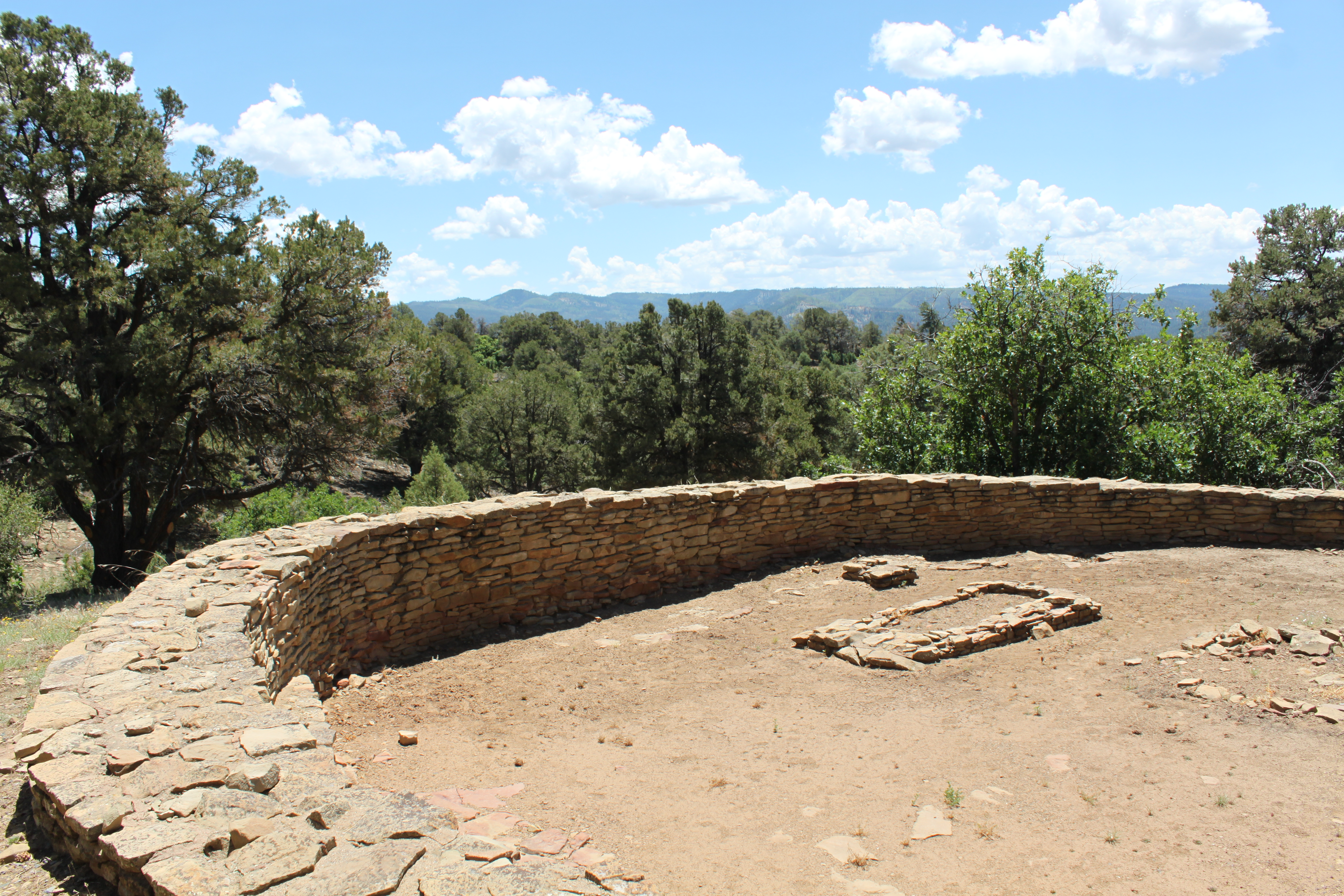
The Great Kiva in Chimney Rock National Monument.

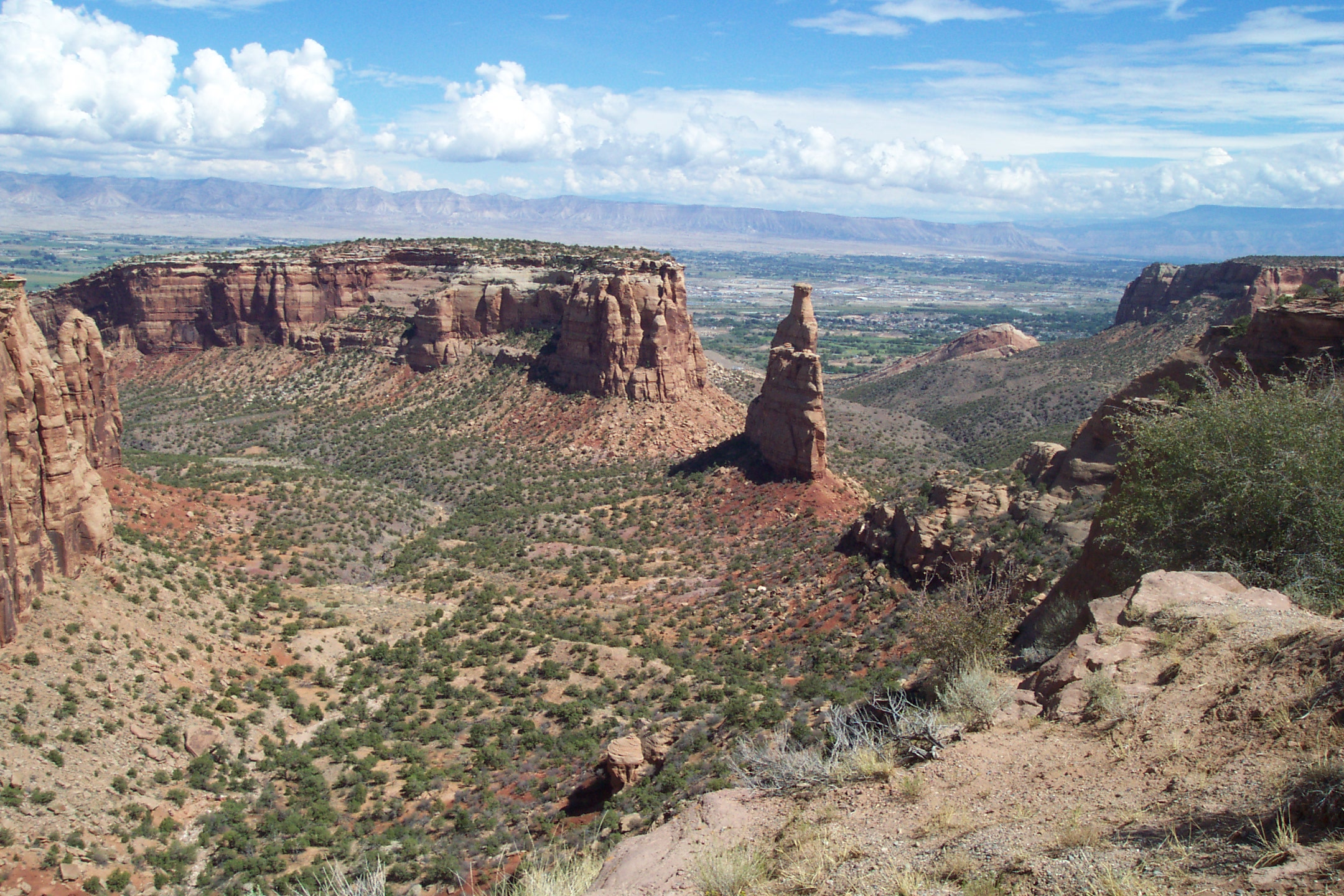
Colorado National Monument.

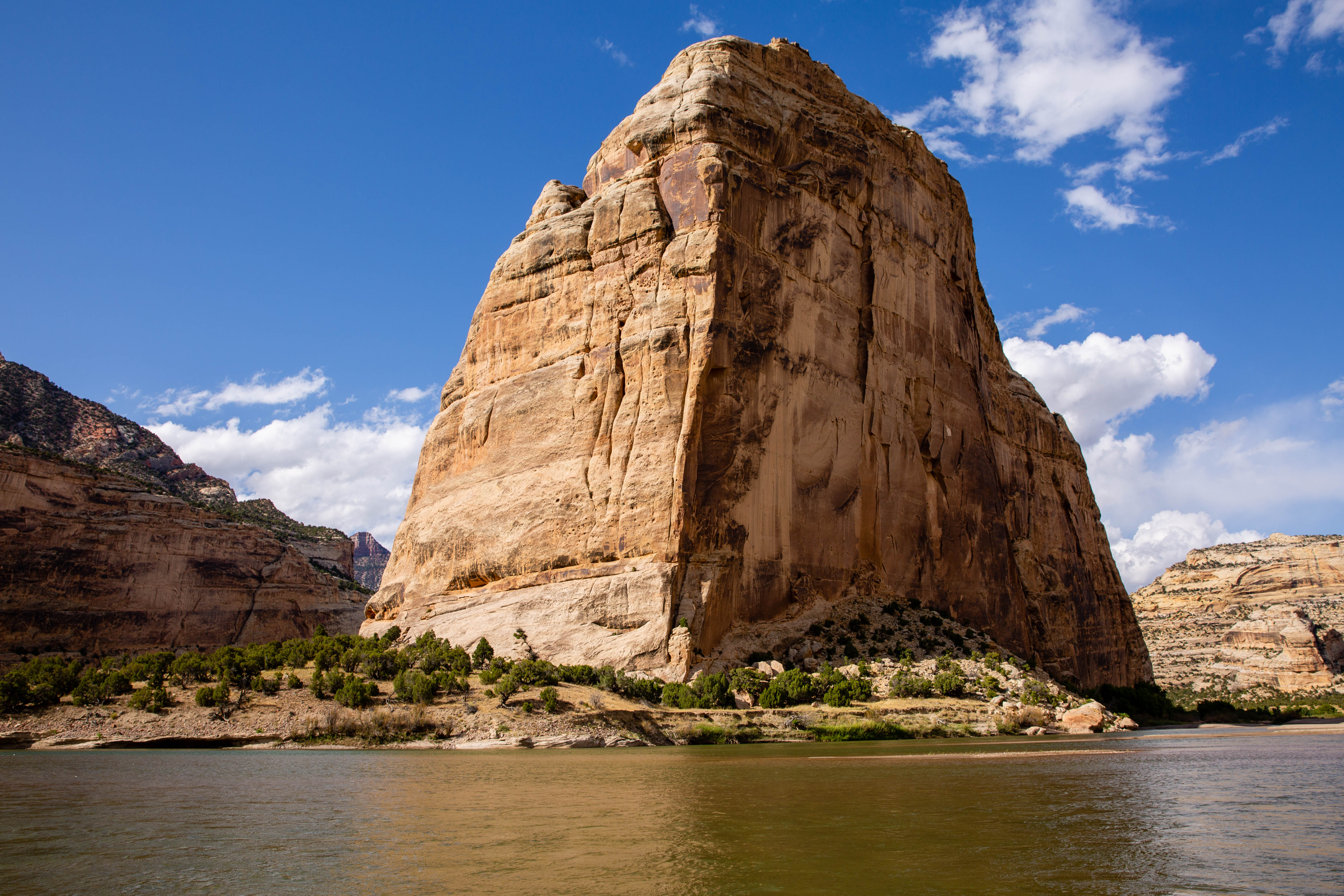
Steamboat Rock in Dinosaur National Monument.

The nine National Monuments in Colorado are:

- Browns Canyon National Monument (Note: Jointly managed by the United States Department of the Interior, Bureau of Land Management and the United States Department of Agriculture, United States Forest Service.) near Nathrop (February 19, 2015, Obama)
- Camp Hale-Continental Divide National Monument between Red Cliff and Leadville in the Eagle River valley (October 12, 2022, Biden)
- Canyons of the Ancients National Monument (Note: Managed by the United States Department of the Interior, Bureau of Land Management.) near Dolores (June 9, 2000, Clinton)
- Chimney Rock National Monument (Note: Managed by the United States Department of Agriculture, United States Forest Service.) near Pagosa Springs (September 21, 2012, Obama)
- Colorado National Monument near Grand Junction and Fruita (May 24, 1911, Taft)
- Dinosaur National Monument (Note: Dinosaur National Monument extends into the State of Utah.) near Dinosaur (80 acres October 4, 1915, Wilson, additional 200,000 acres July 14, 1938, F. Roosevelt)
- Florissant Fossil Beds National Monument near Florissant (August 20, 1969, Nixon)
- Hovenweep National Monument (Note: Hovenweep National Monument extends into the State of Utah.) near Cortez (March 2, 1923, Harding)
- Yucca House National Monument (Note: Yucca House National Monument remains undeveloped.) near Cortez (December 19, 1919, Wilson)

Two former National Monuments were elevated to National Park:

- Black Canyon of the Gunnison National Monument (March 2, 1933, Hoover, to October 21, 1999)
- Great Sand Dunes National Monument (March 17, 1932, Hoover, to September 24, 2004)

Two former National Monuments were abolished due to their remoteness:

- Holy Cross National Monument near Minturn (May 11, 1929, Hoover, abolished August 3, 1950)
- Wheeler National Monument near Creede (December 7, 1908, T. Roosevelt, abolished August 3, 1950)

==== National Historic Sites ====
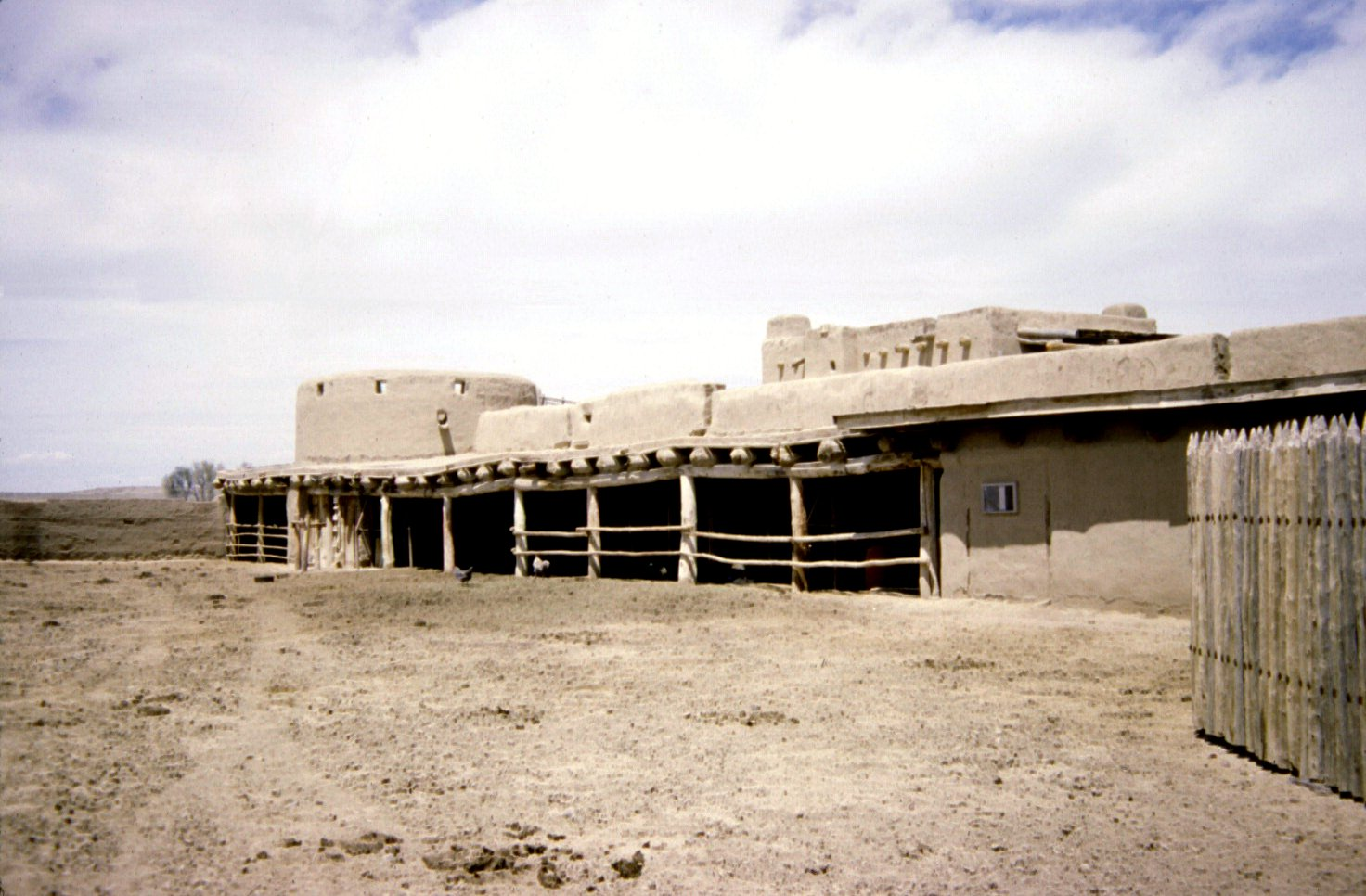
Bent's Old Fort National Historic Site on the Santa Fe National Historic Trail.

The three National Historic Sites within Colorado are:

- Amache National Historic Site near Granada
- Bent's Old Fort National Historic Site near La Junta
- Sand Creek Massacre National Historic Site near Chivington

==== National Recreation Areas ====
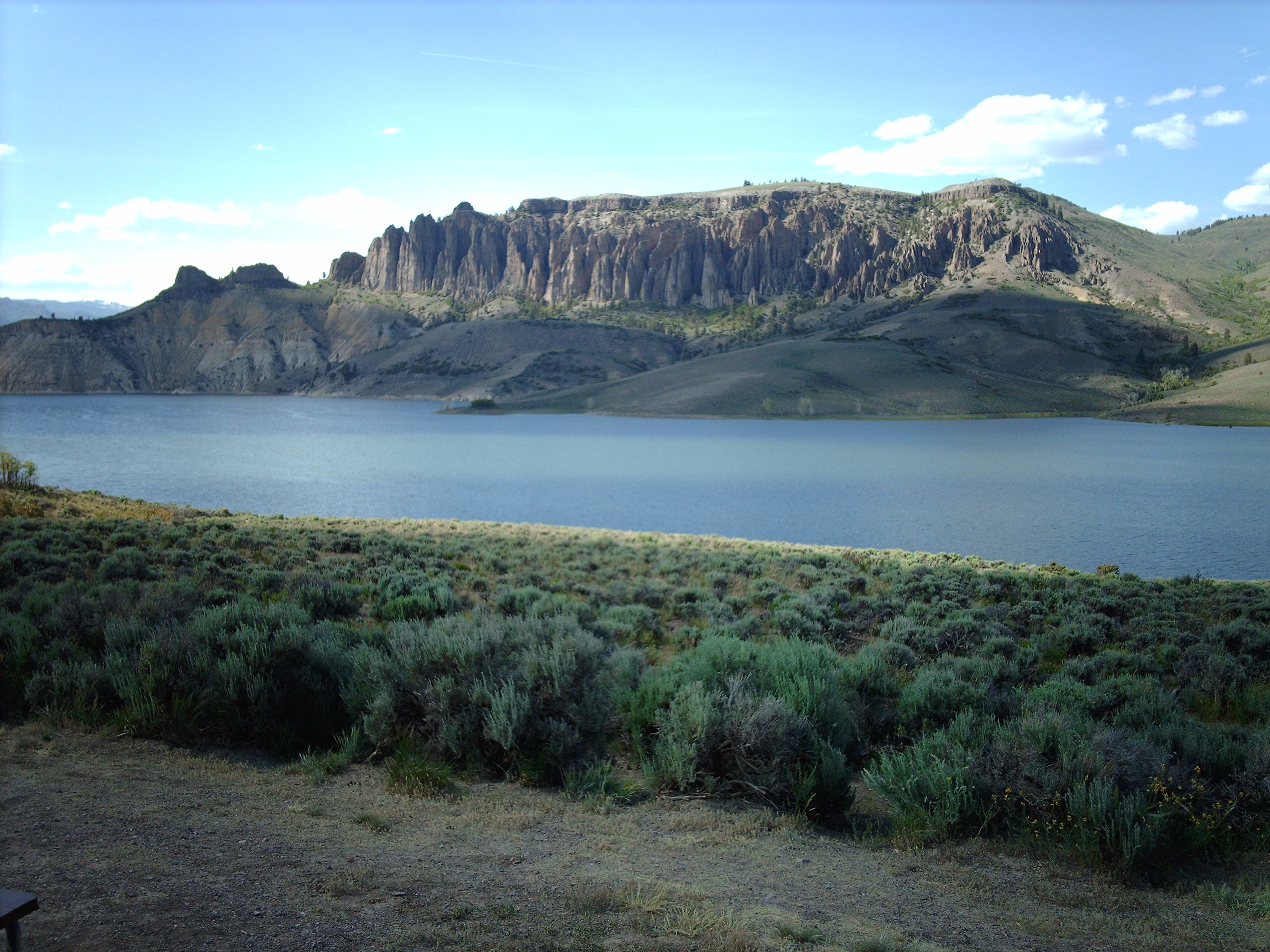
The Dillon Pinnacles in Curecanti National Recreation Area.

The two National Recreation Areas within Colorado are:

- Arapaho National Recreation Area near Granby
- Curecanti National Recreation Area near Gunnison

==== National Historic Trails ====
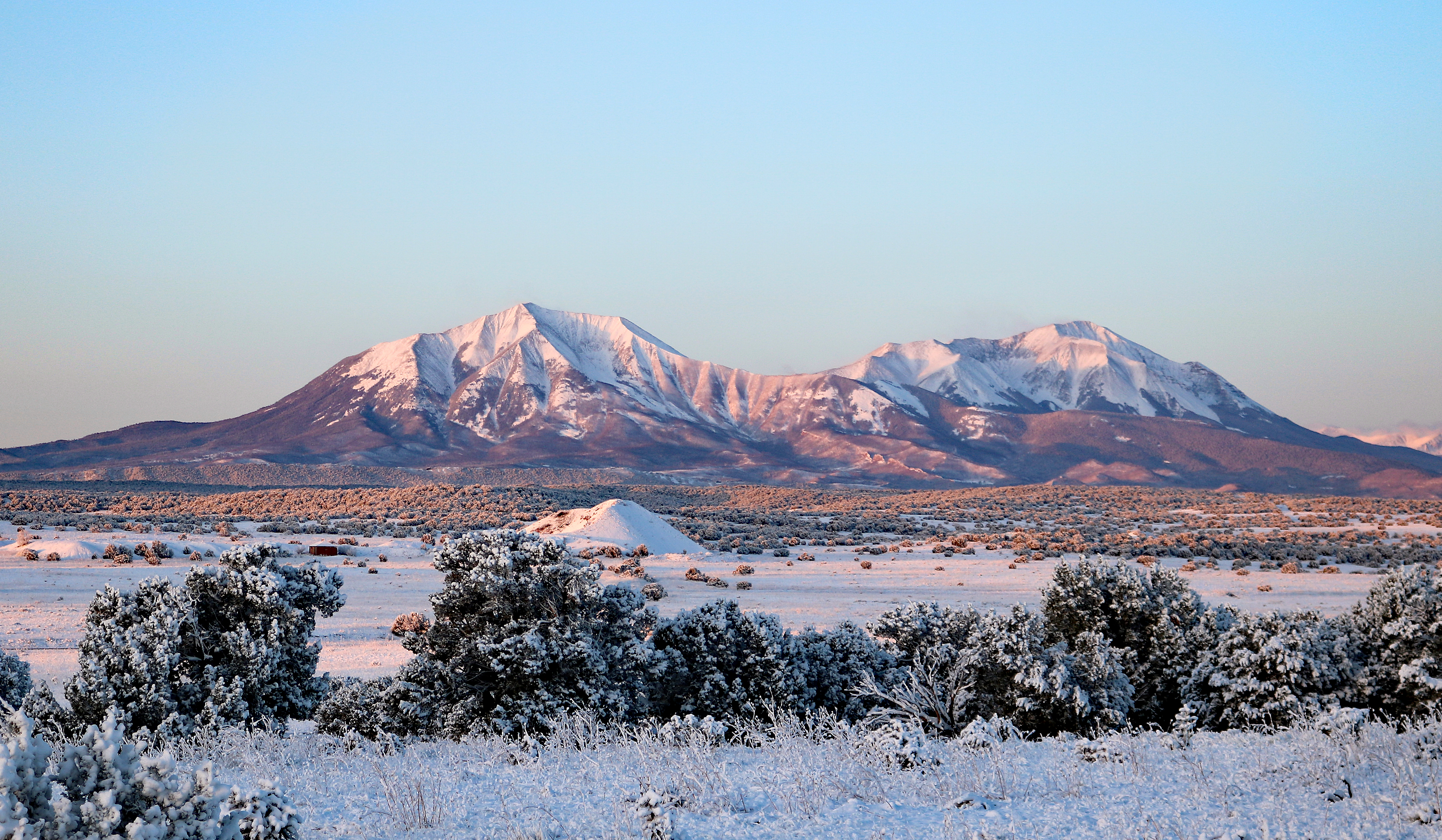
Spanish Peaks as seen from the Santa Fe National Historic Trail.

The four National Historic Trails that pass through Colorado are:

- California National Historic Trail (Note: The California National Historic Trail traverses ten U.S. states: Missouri, Kansas, Nebraska, Colorado, Wyoming, Idaho, Utah, Nevada, Oregon, and California.) through Sedgwick County
- Old Spanish National Historic Trail (Note: The Old Spanish National Historic Trail traverses six U.S. states: New Mexico, Colorado, Utah, Arizona, Nevada, and California.) through southwestern Colorado
- Pony Express National Historic Trail (Note: The Pony Express National Historic Trail traverses eight U.S. states: Missouri, Kansas, Nebraska, Colorado, Wyoming, Utah, Nevada, and California.) through Sedgwick County
- Santa Fe National Historic Trail (Note: The Santa Fe National Historic Trail traverses five U.S. states: Missouri, Kansas, Colorado, Oklahoma, and New Mexico.) through southeastern Colorado

==== National Scenic Trail ====
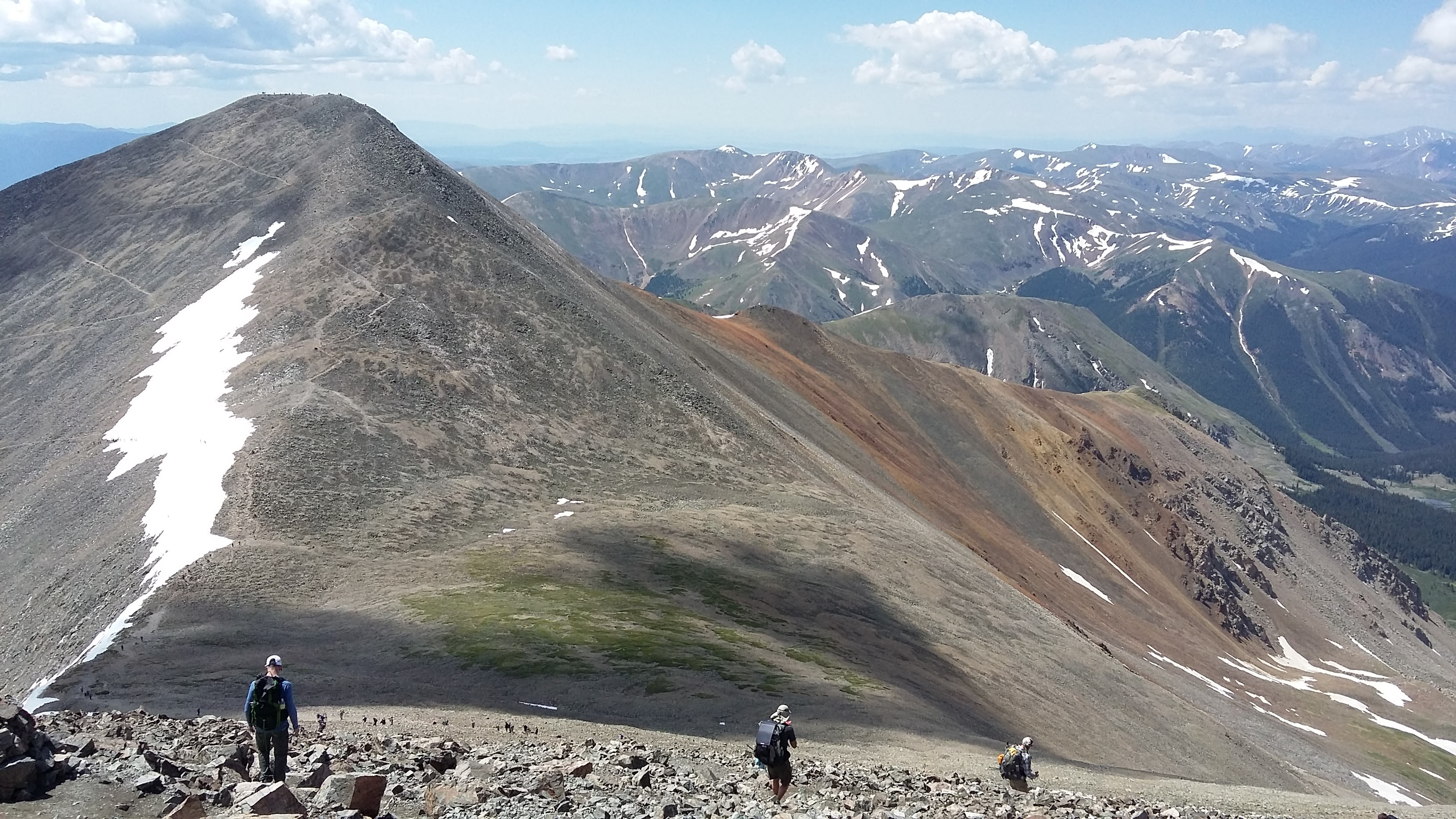
Grays Peak is the highest point on the Continental Divide National Scenic Trail and the Continental Divide in North America.

The National Scenic Trail that passes through Colorado is:

- Continental Divide National Scenic Trail (Note: The Continental Divide National Scenic Trail traverses five U.S. states: Montana, Idaho, Wyoming, Colorado, and New Mexico.) along the Continental Divide of the Americas

=== National Forests ===
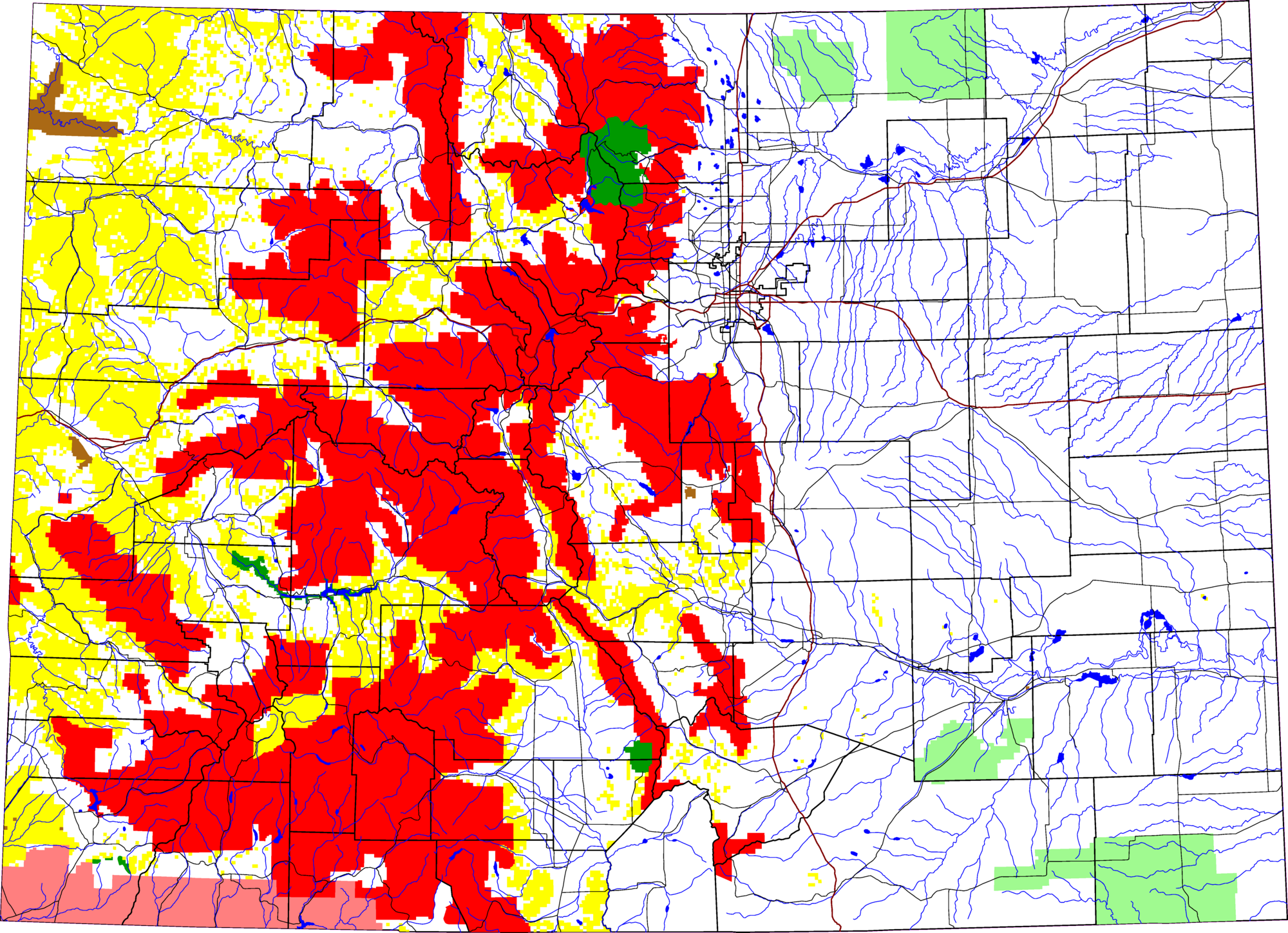
An enlargeable map of Colorado showing the 11 National Forests in red and the 2 National Grasslands in light green

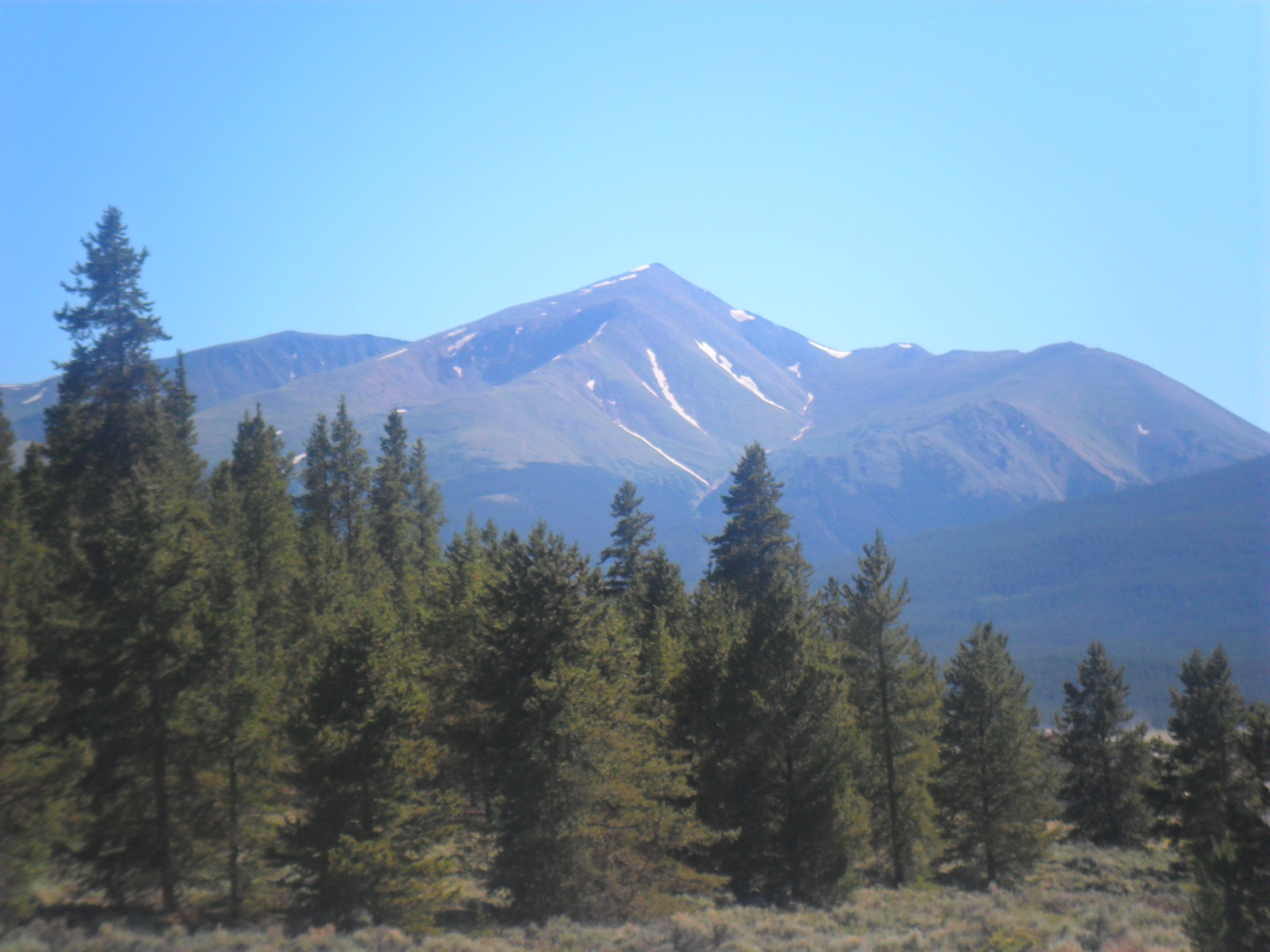
Mount Elbert in the San Isabel National Forest.

The United States Forest Service manages the 11 National Forests within Colorado.

- Arapaho National Forest
- Grand Mesa National Forest
- Gunnison National Forest
- Pike National Forest
- Rio Grande National Forest
- Roosevelt National Forest
- Routt National Forest
- San Isabel National Forest
- San Juan National Forest
- Uncompahgre National Forest
- White River National Forest

=== National Grasslands ===
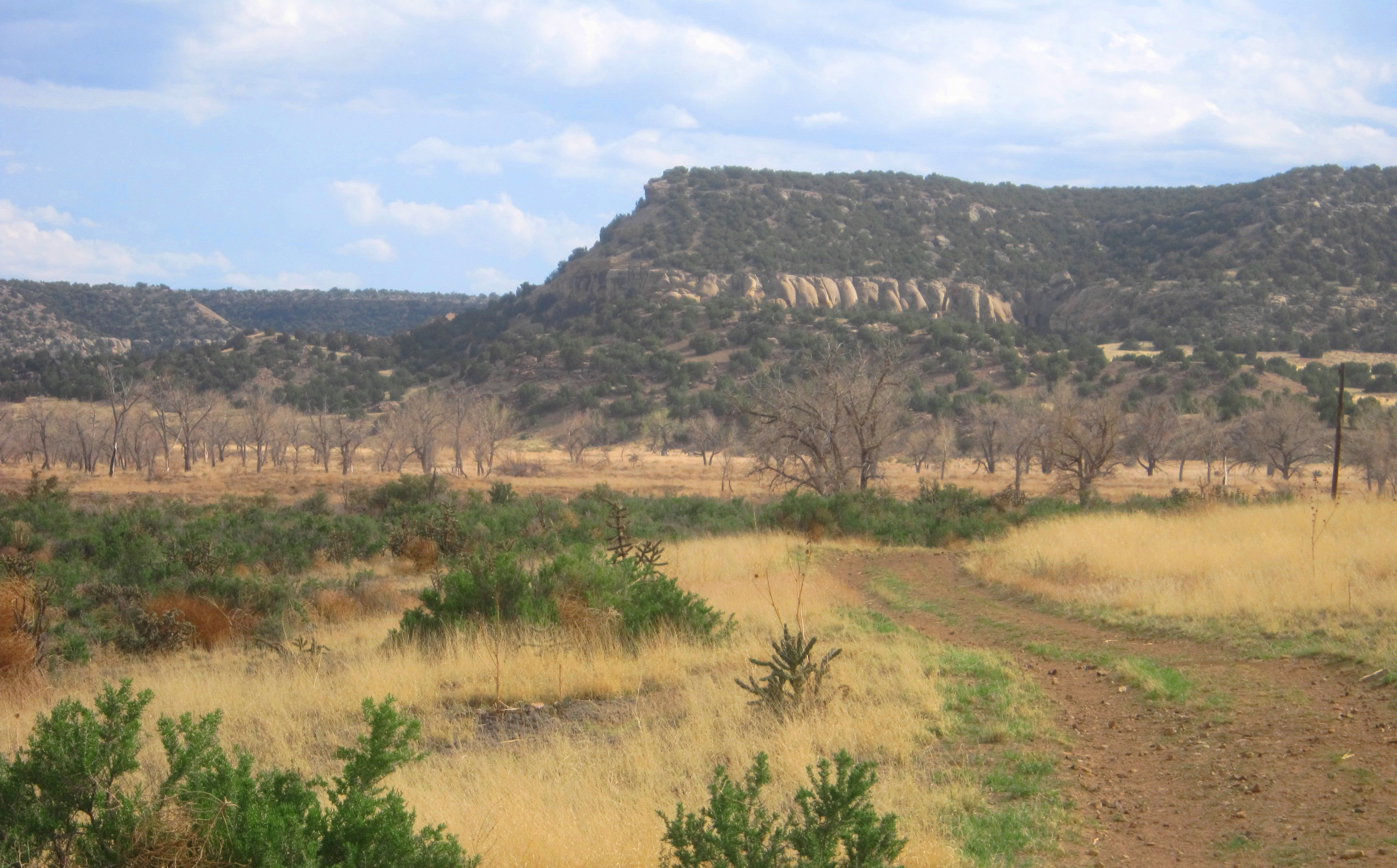
Picketwire Canyon in Comanche National Grassland.

The United States Forest Service manages the two National Grasslands within Colorado.

- Comanche National Grassland – southeastern Colorado
- Pawnee National Grassland – northeastern Colorado

=== National Wildernesses ===
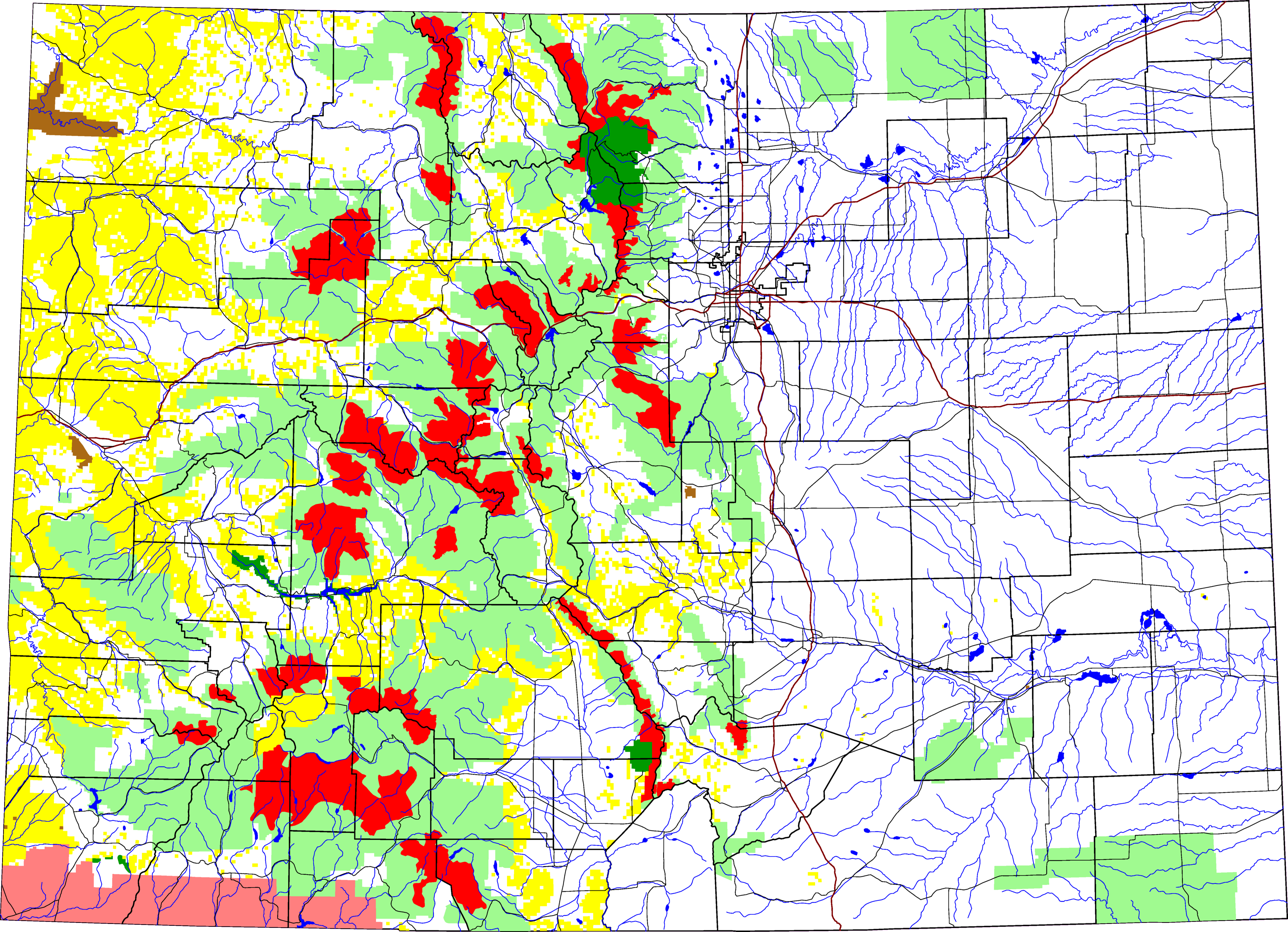
An enlargeable map of Colorado showing the 44 National Wildernesses in red

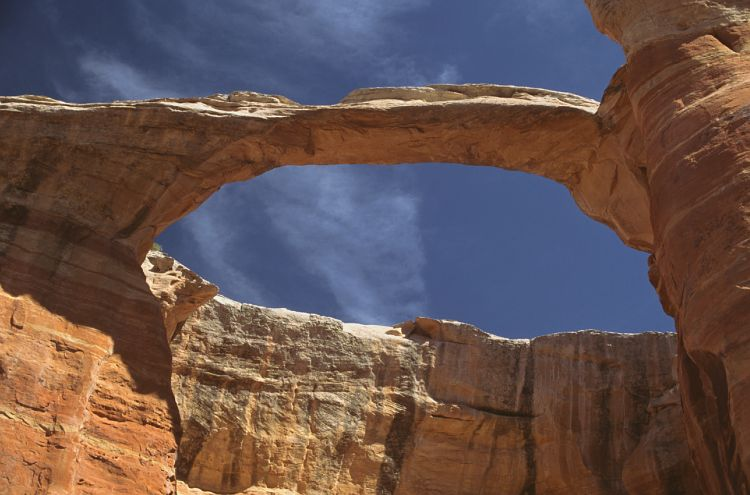
East Rim Arch in the Black Ridge Canyons Wilderness.

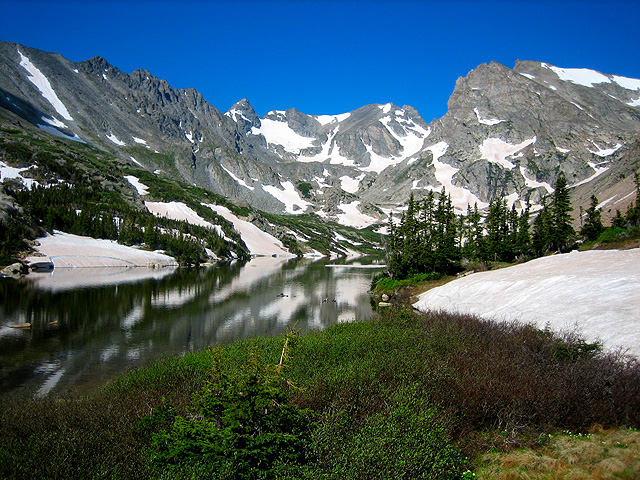
Lake Isabelle in the Indian Peaks Wilderness.

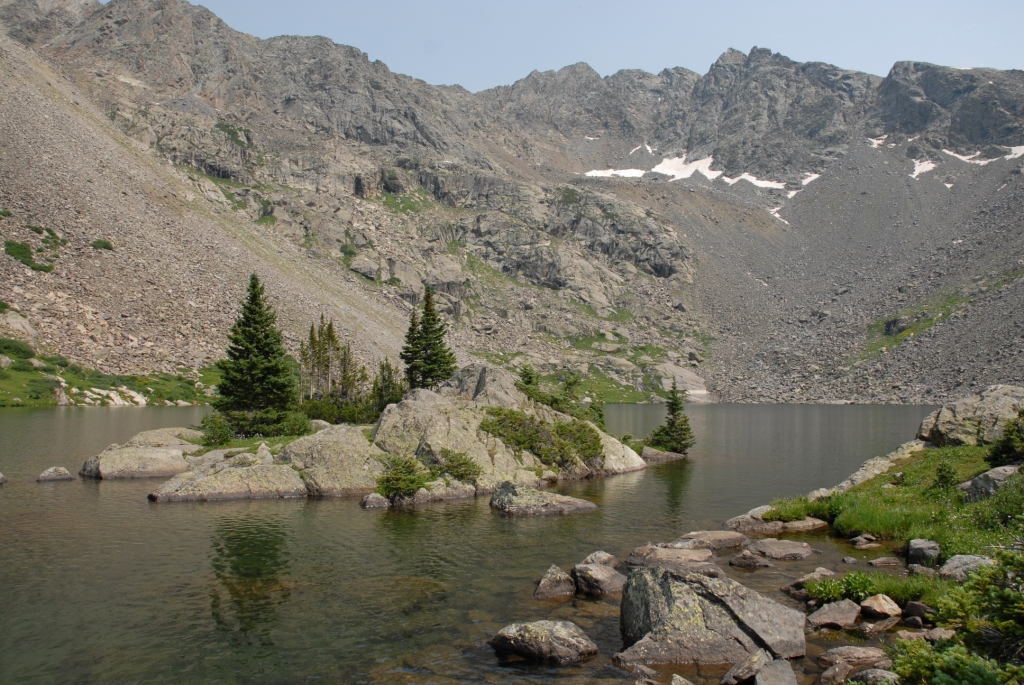
Mystic Island Lake in the Holy Cross Wilderness.

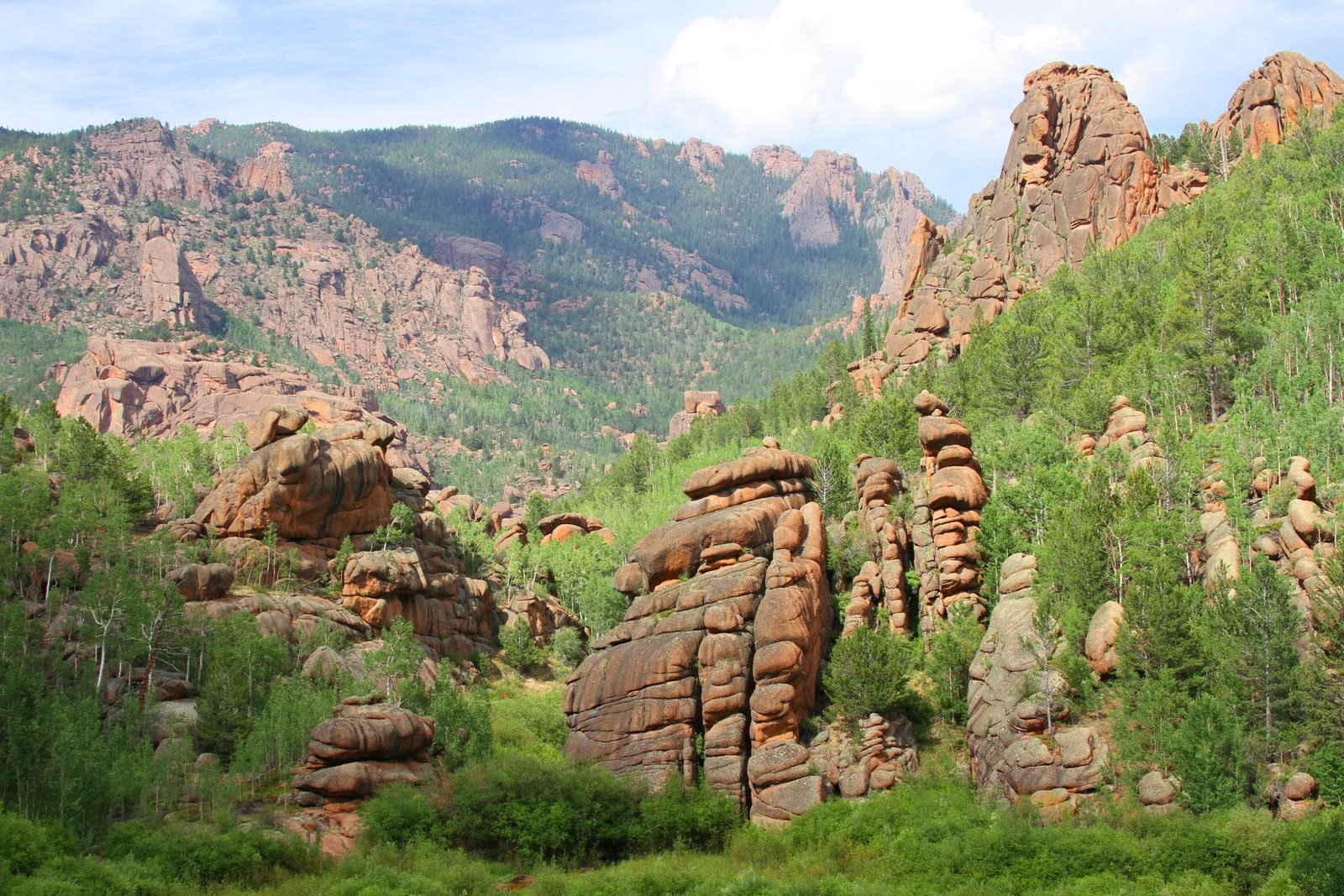
The Lost Creek Wilderness.

There are 44 National Wildernesses within Colorado. The United States Forest Service manages 34, the National Park Service manages four, the Bureau of Land Management manages three, the United States Forest Service and the Bureau of Land Management jointly manage two, and the United States Forest Service and the National Park Service jointly manage one National Wilderness.

- Black Canyon of the Gunnison Wilderness (Note: Managed by the United States Department of the Interior, National Park Service.)
- Black Ridge Canyons Wilderness
- Buffalo Peaks Wilderness
- Byers Peak Wilderness
- Cache La Poudre Wilderness
- Collegiate Peaks Wilderness
- Comanche Peak Wilderness
- Dominguez Canyon Wilderness
- Eagles Nest Wilderness
- Flat Tops Wilderness
- Fossil Ridge Wilderness
- Great Sand Dunes Wilderness
- Greenhorn Mountain Wilderness
- Gunnison Gorge Wilderness
- Hermosa Creek Wilderness
- Holy Cross Wilderness
- Hunter-Fryingpan Wilderness
- Indian Peaks Wilderness (Note: Jointly managed by the United States Department of the Interior, National Park Service and the United States Department of Agriculture, National Forest Service.)
- James Peak Wilderness
- La Garita Wilderness
- Lizard Head Wilderness
- Lost Creek Wilderness
- Maroon Bells-Snowmass Wilderness
- Mesa Verde Wilderness
- Mount Evans Wilderness
- Mount Massive Wilderness
- Mount Sneffels Wilderness
- Mount Zirkel Wilderness
- Neota Wilderness
- Never Summer Wilderness
- Platte River Wilderness
- Powderhorn Wilderness
- Ptarmigan Peak Wilderness
- Raggeds Wilderness
- Rawah Wilderness
- Rocky Mountain National Park Wilderness
- Sangre de Cristo Wilderness
- Sarvis Creek Wilderness
- South San Juan Wilderness
- Spanish Peaks Wilderness
- Uncompahgre Wilderness
- Vasquez Peak Wilderness
- Weminuche Wilderness
- West Elk Wilderness

=== National Conservation Areas ===
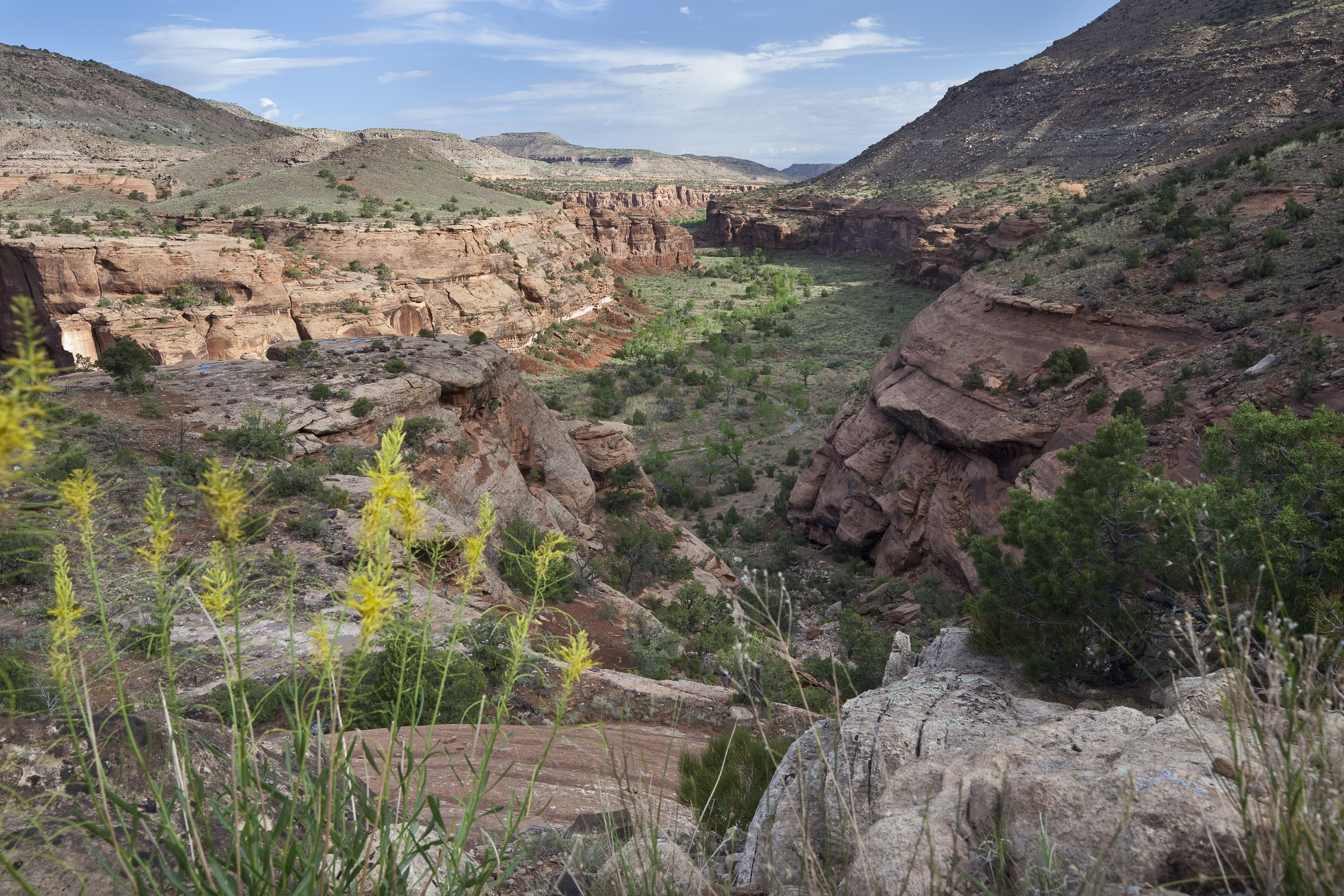
The Dominguez–Escalante NCA.

The Bureau of Land Management manages the three National Conservation Areas within Colorado.

- Dominguez–Escalante National Conservation Area
- Gunnison Gorge National Conservation Area
- McInnis Canyons National Conservation Area

=== National Wildlife Refuges ===
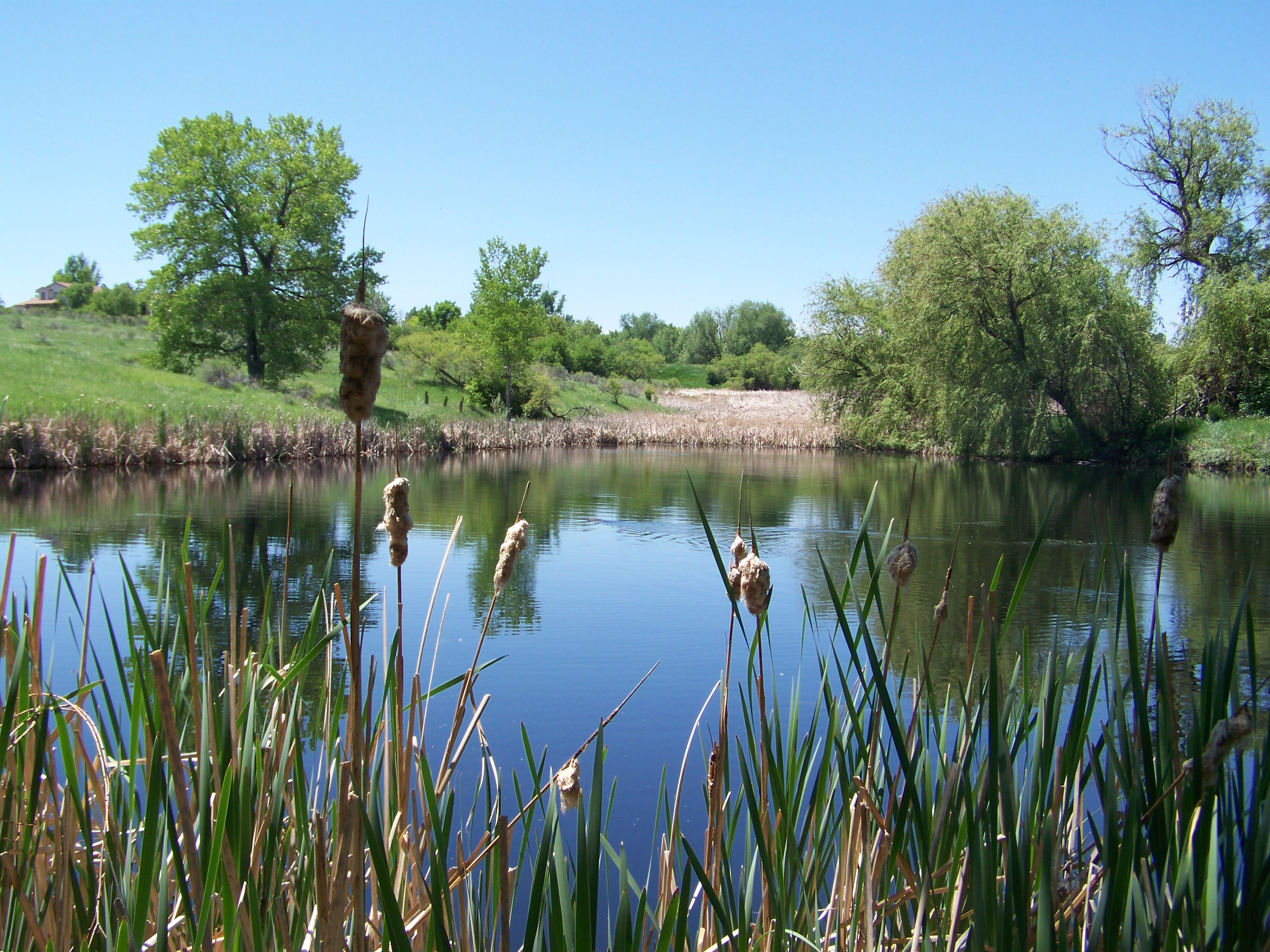
The Two Ponds National Wildlife Refuge.

The United States Fish and Wildlife Service manages the eight National Wildlife Refuges within Colorado.

- Alamosa National Wildlife Refuge
- Arapaho National Wildlife Refuge
- Baca National Wildlife Refuge
- Browns Park National Wildlife Refuge
- Monte Vista National Wildlife Refuge
- Rocky Flats National Wildlife Refuge
- Rocky Mountain Arsenal National Wildlife Refuge
- Two Ponds National Wildlife Refuge

== Federally designated areas ==
The following areas are designated by the National Park Service, but reside on a variety of federal, state, county, city, town, and private lands.

=== National Heritage Areas ===
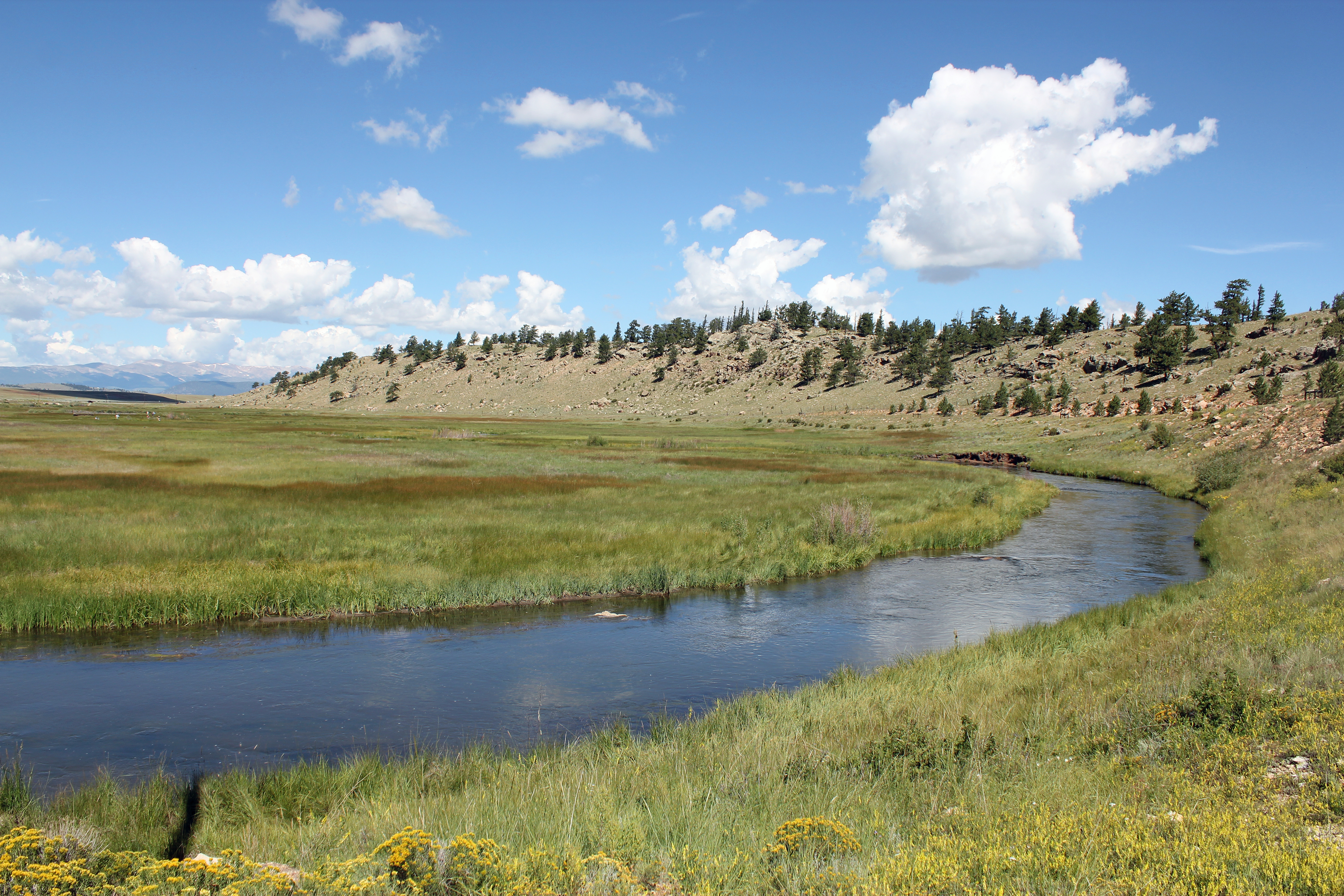
The South Fork South Platte River in the South Park National Heritage Area.

The three National Heritage Areas in Colorado are:

- Cache La Poudre River Corridor National Heritage Area
- Sangre de Cristo National Heritage Area
- South Park National Heritage Area

=== National Historic Landmarks ===
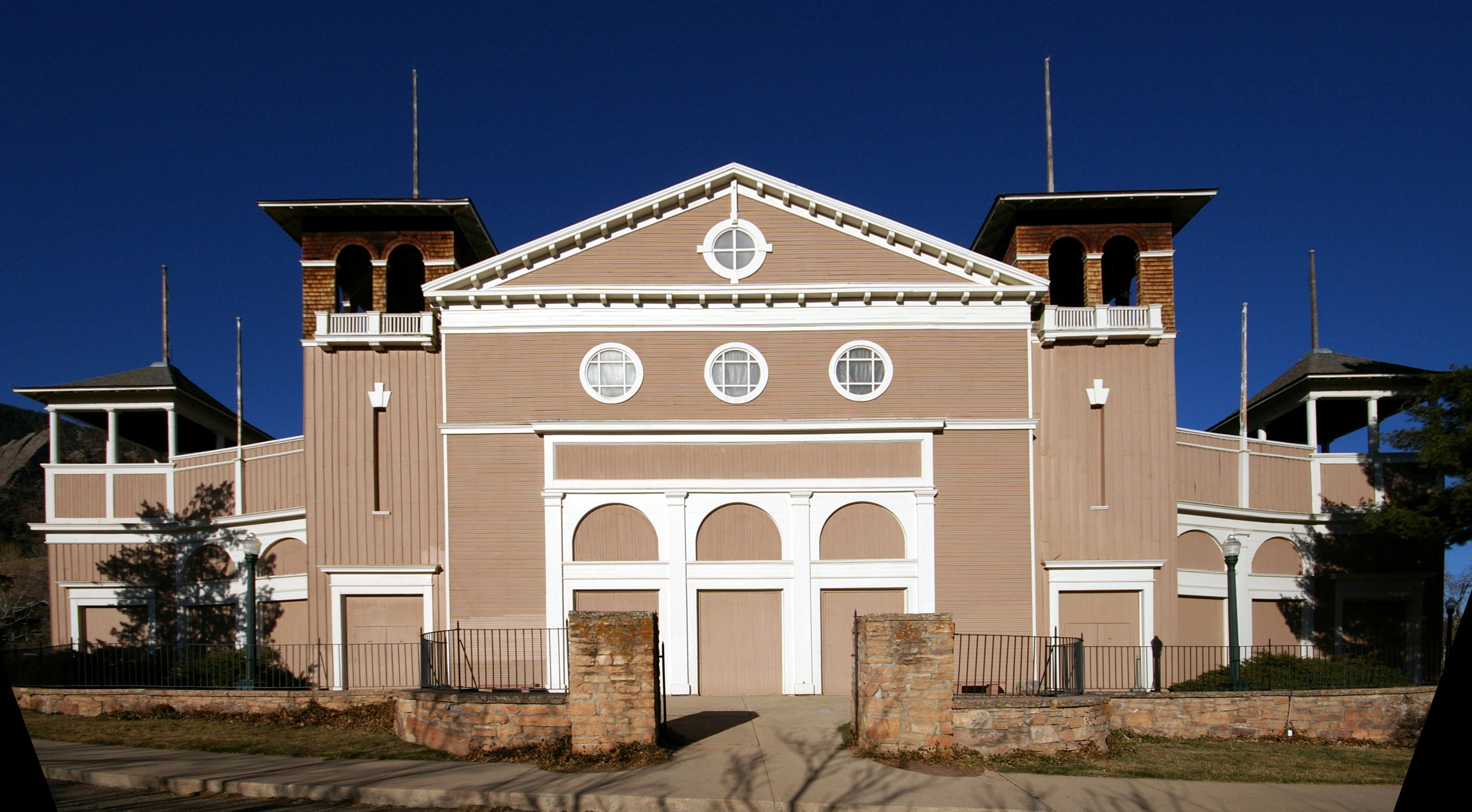
The Colorado Chautauqua Auditorium.

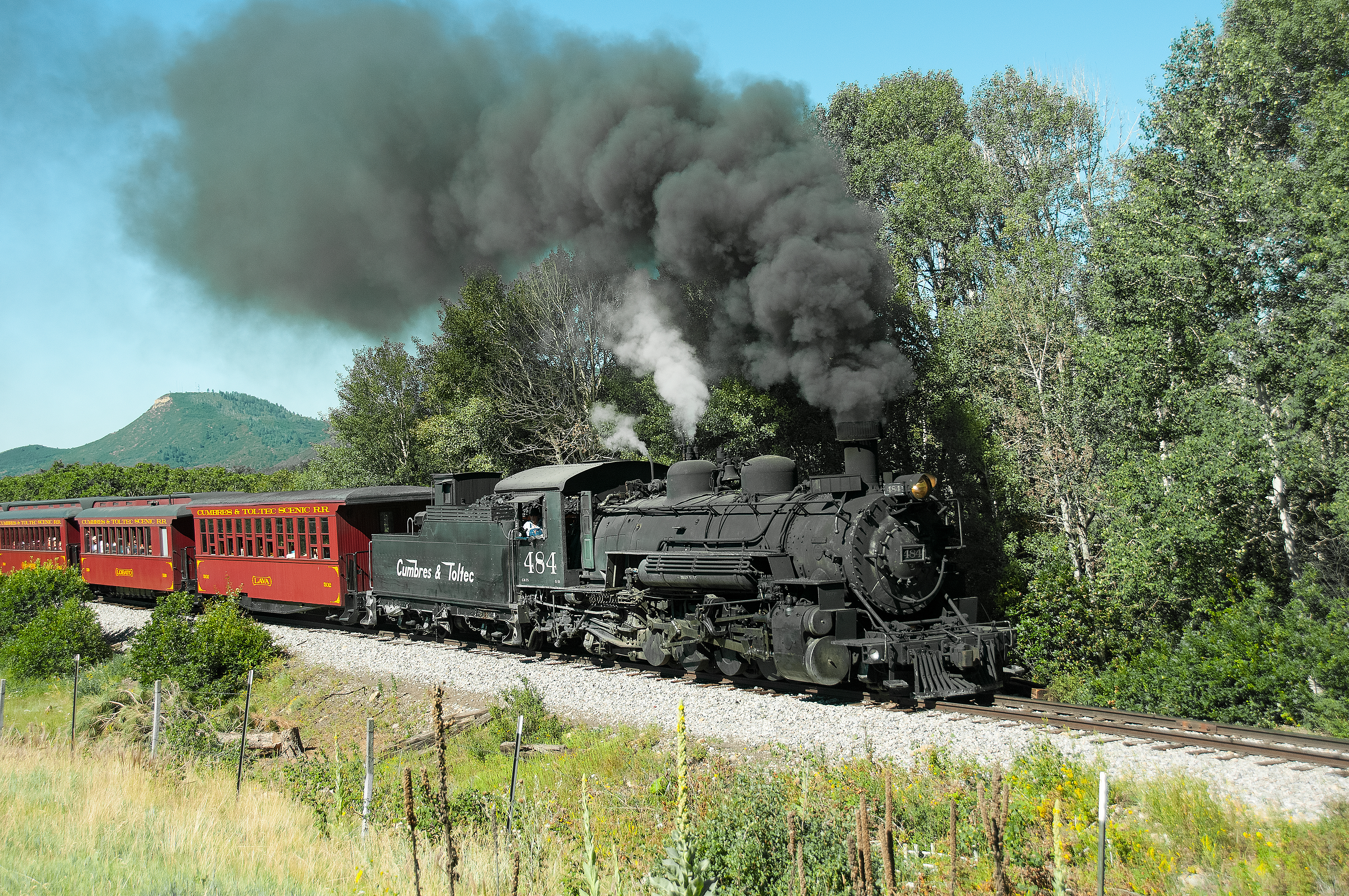
The Cumbres and Toltec Scenic Railroad.

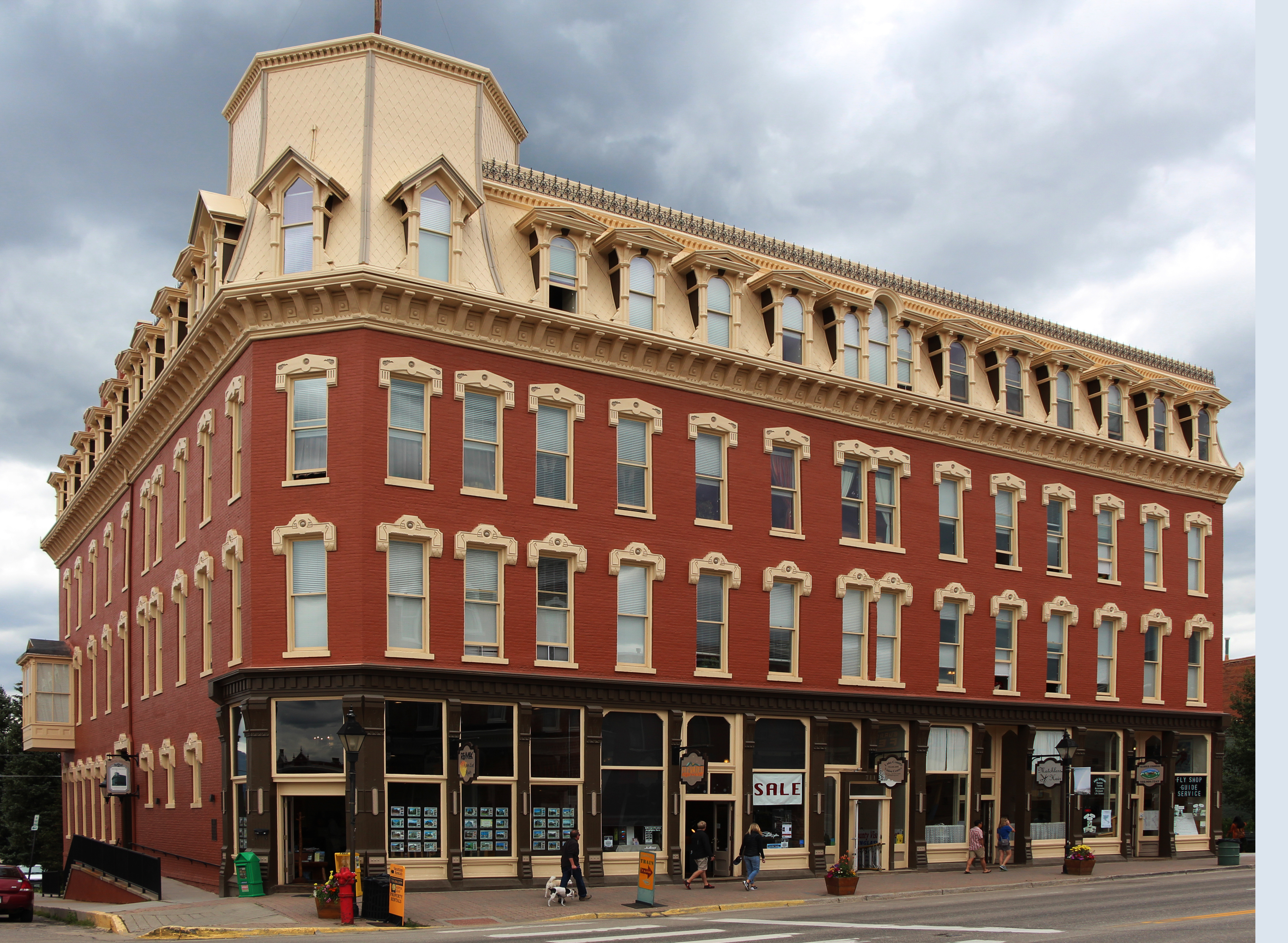
The Tabor Grand Hotel in the Leadville Historic District.

The 26 National Historic Landmarks in Colorado are:

- Bent's Old Fort
- Burlingon Carousel
- Central City/Black Hawk Historic District
- Colorado Chautauqua
- Colorado Fuel and Iron Company Administrative Complex
- Cripple Creek Historic District
- Cumbres and Toltec Scenic Railroad
- Denver Civic Center
- Durango-Silverton Narrow-Gauge Railroad
- Georgetown-Silver Plume Historic District
- Granada War Relocation Center
- Leadville Historic District
- Lindenmeier site
- Lowry Ruin
- Ludlow Tent Colony Site
- Mesa Verde Administrative District
- Pikes Peak
- Pike's Stockade
- Raton Pass
- Red Rocks Park
- Rocky Mountain National Park Administration Building
- Shenandoah-Dives (Mayflower) Mill
- Silverton Historic District
- Telluride Historic District
- Trujillo Homesteads
- United States Air Force Academy, Cadet Area (Note: Managed by the United States Air Force.)

=== National Natural Landmarks ===
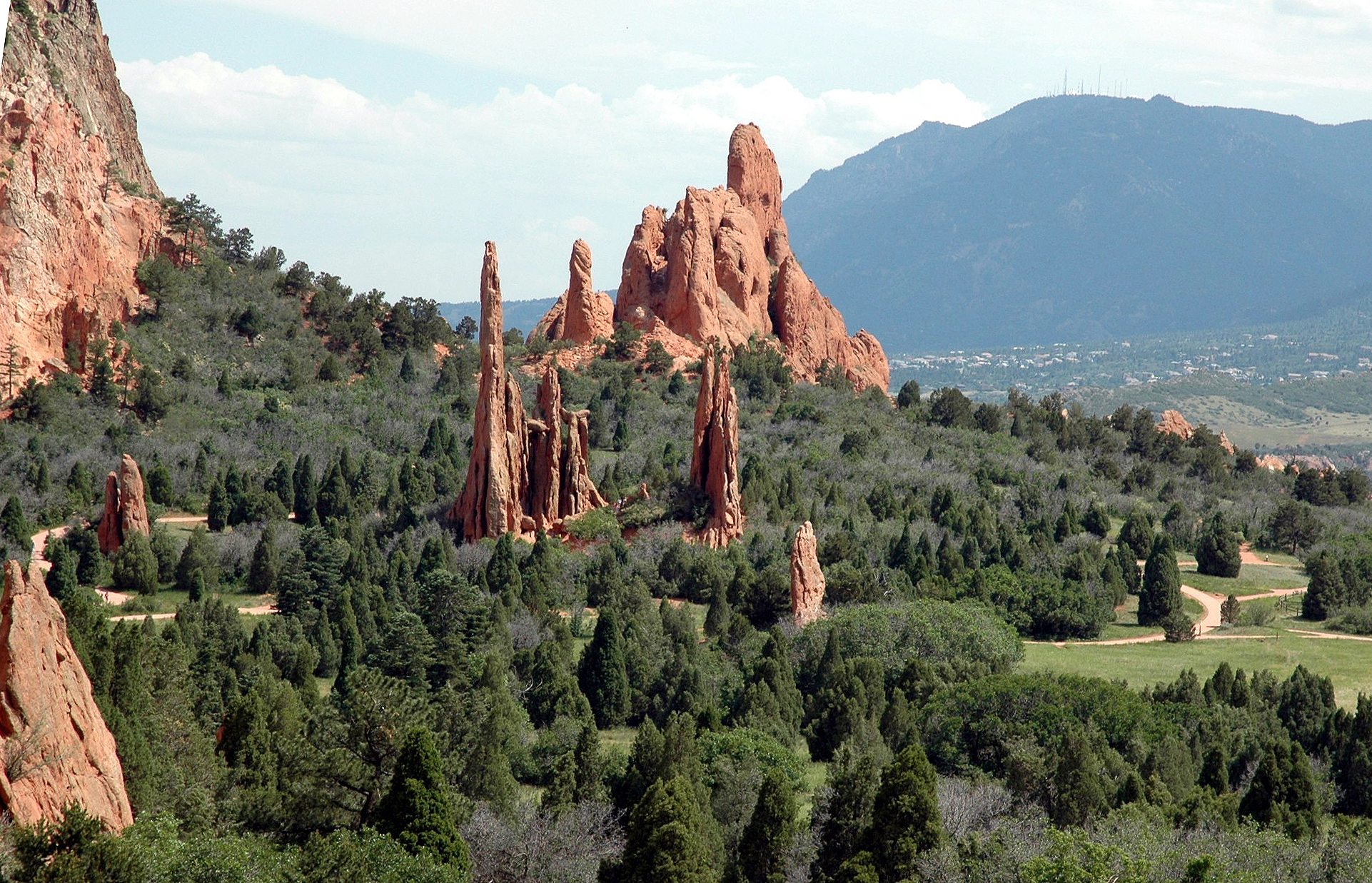
The Garden of the Gods.

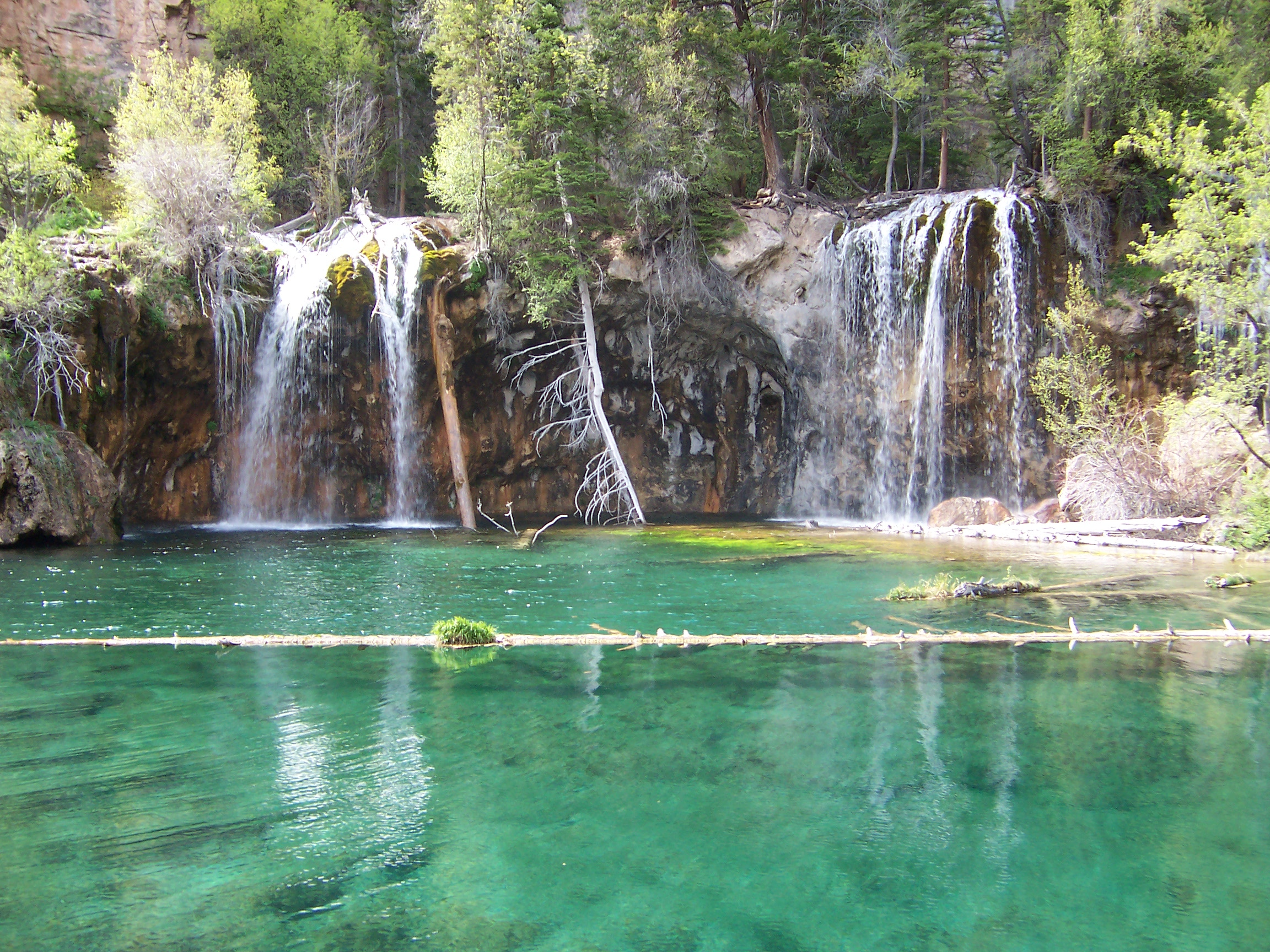
Hanging Lake .

The 16 National Natural Landmarks in Colorado are:

- Big Spring Creek
- Garden of the Gods
- Garden Park Fossil Area
- Hanging Lake
- Indian Springs Trace Fossil Site
- Lost Creek Scenic Area
- Morrison-Golden Fossil Areas
- Raton Mesa
- Roxborough State Park (Note: Managed by Colorado Parks and Wildlife.)
- Russell Lakes
- Sand Creek
- Slumgullion Earthflow
- Spanish Peaks
- Sulphur Cave and Spring
- Summit Lake
- West Bijou Site

=== National Recreation Trails ===
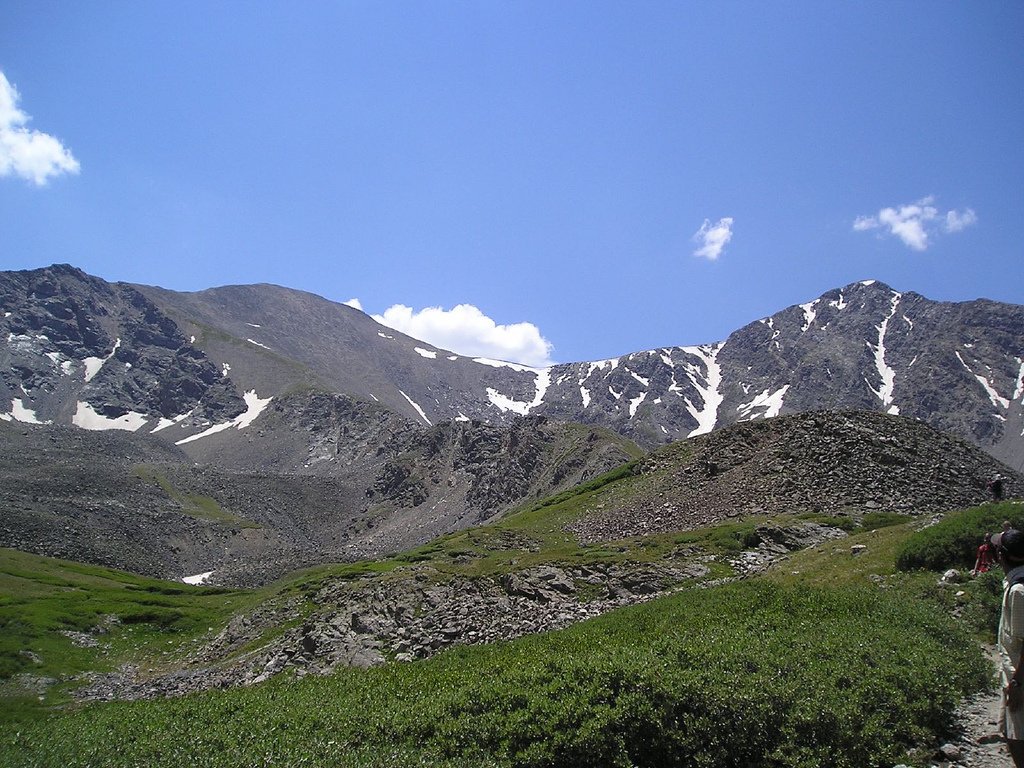
Grays Peak National Recreation Trail approaching the summit

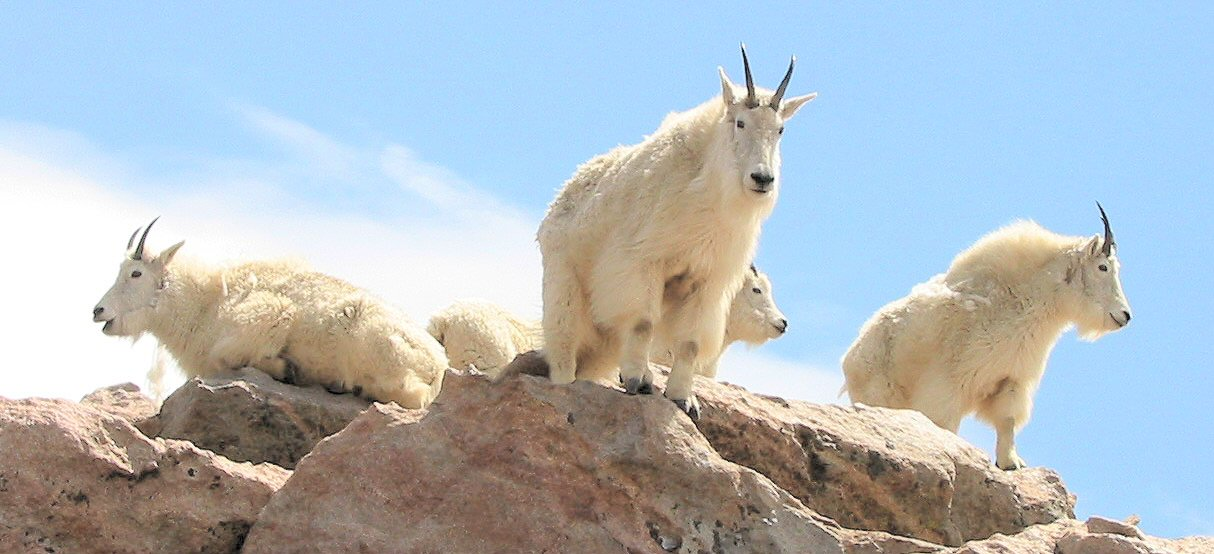
Mountain goats along the Mount Evans National Recreation Trail.

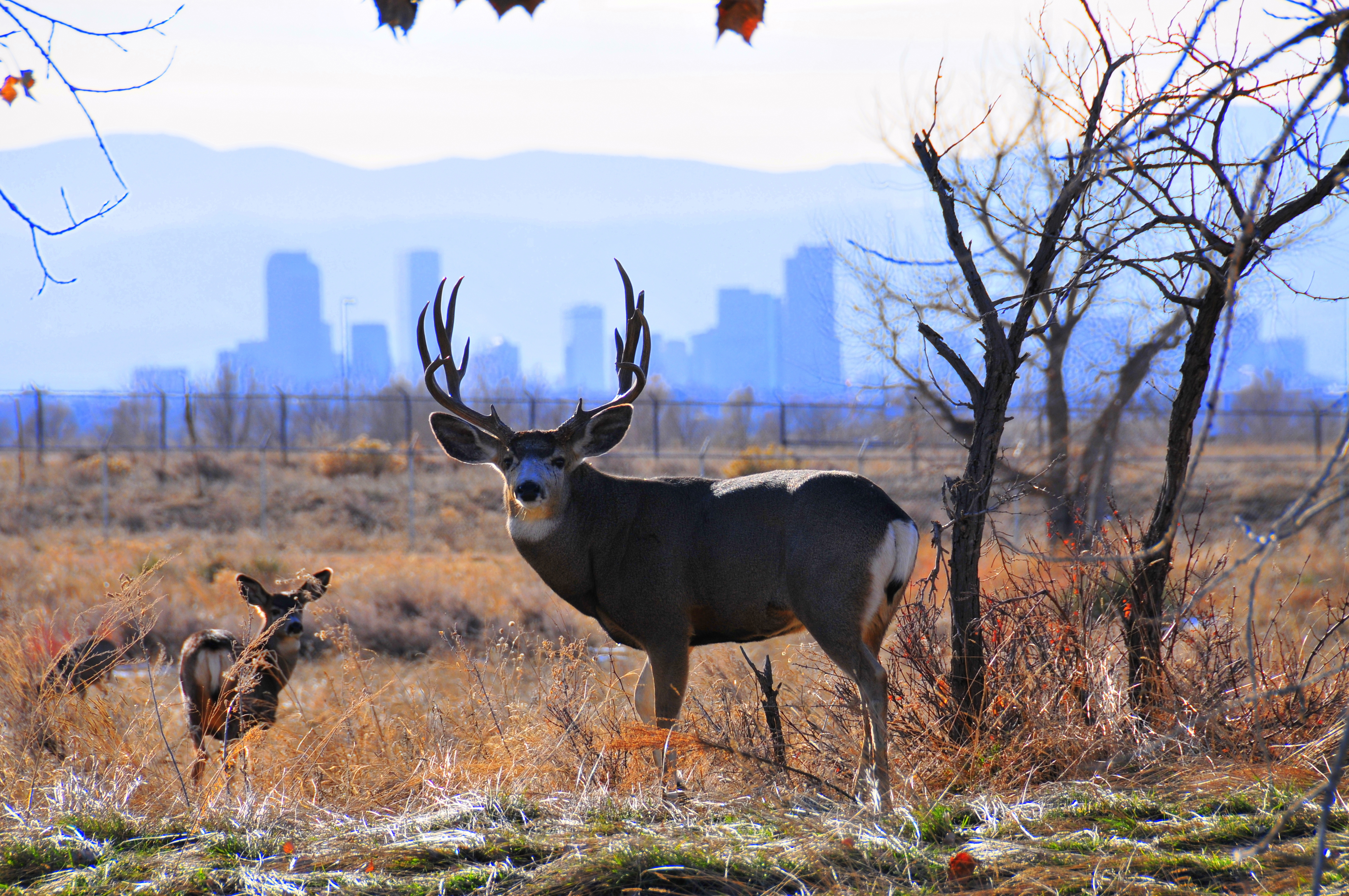
Mule deer along one of the Rocky Mountain Arsenal National Recreation Trails.

The 28 federally designated National Recreation Trails in Colorado are:

- Apex National Recreation Trail (Note: Managed by the Jefferson County Open Space Program.) near Golden
- Barr National Recreation Trail between Manitou Springs and Pikes Peak
- Bear Creek National Recreation Trail near Ouray
- Big Dry Creek National Recreation Trail (Note: Managed by the City of Westminster, Colorado.) through Westminster
- Calico National Recreation Trail near Dolores
- Crag Crest National Recreation Trail near Cedaredge
- Devils Head National Recreation Trail near Sedalia
- Fish Creek Falls National Recreation Trail near Steamboat Springs
- Grays Peak National Recreation Trail near Silver Plume
- Greyrock Mountain National Recreation Trail near Laporte
- High Line Canal National Recreation Trail (Note: Managed by Colorado State Parks.) through metropolitan Denver
- Highline Loop National Recreation Trail near Dolores
- Lake Fork National Recreation Trail near South Fork
- Mineral Belt National Recreation Trail (Note: Managed by Lake County, Colorado.) near Leadville
- Mount Evans National Recreation Trail near Idaho Springs
- Mount McConnel National Recreation Trail near Laporte
- Petroglyph Point National Recreation Trail in Mesa Verde National Park
- Platte River Greenway National Recreation Trail through metropolitan Denver
- Poudre River National Recreation Trail (Note: Managed by the Poudre River Trail Corridor, Inc.) between Greeley and Windsor
- Rocky Mountain Arsenal National Recreation Trails (Note: Managed by the United States Department of the Interior, United States Fish and Wildlife Service.) near Denver
- Round Mountain National Recreation Trail near Loveland
- Swamp Park National Recreation Trail near Steamboat Springs
- Two Elk National Recreation Trail near Vail
- Two Ponds National Recreation Trail in Arvada
- Vail Pass National Recreation Trail between Copper Mountain and Vail
- West Lost Trail Creek National Recreation Trail near Creede
- Wheeler Ten Mile National Recreation Trail between Frisco and Copper Mountain
- White House Ranch National Recreation Trail (Note: Managed by the Colorado Springs Parks and Recreation Department.) in Colorado Springs

=== National Register of Historic Places ===
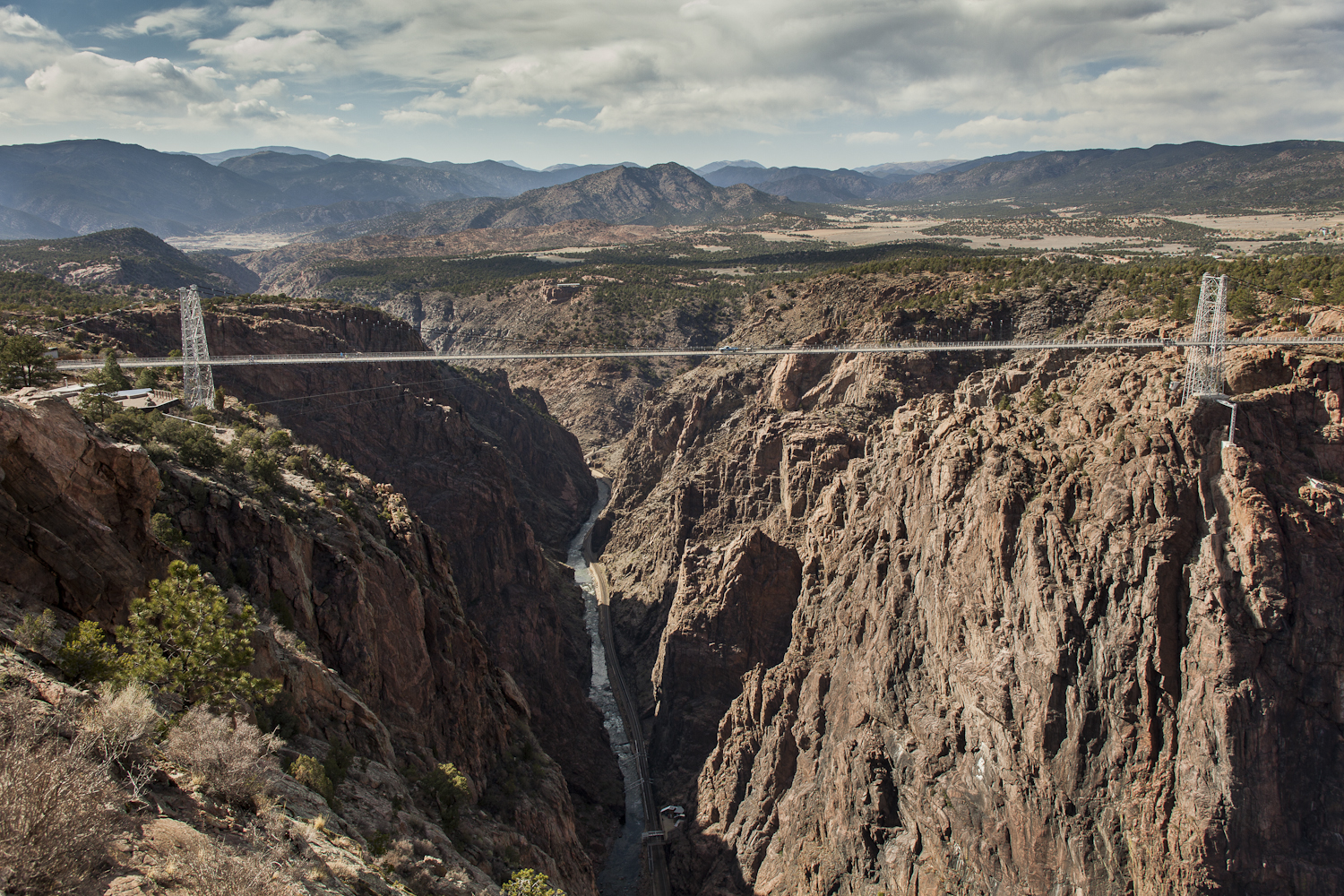
The Royal Gorge Bridge.

There are more than 1,500 Colorado sites on the National Register of Historic Places.

=== Wild and Scenic River ===
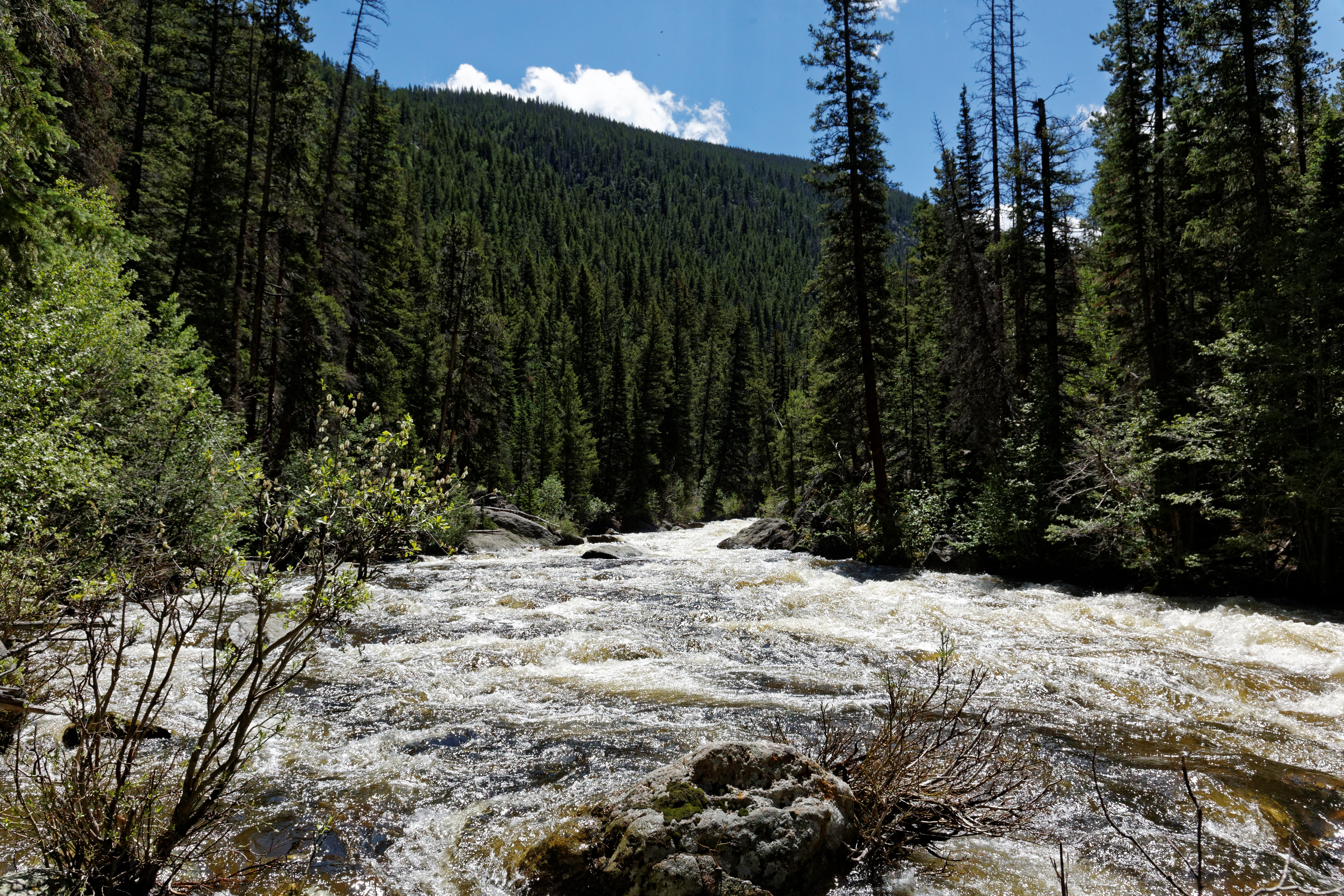
The Cache la Poudre Wild and Scenic River.

The Wild and Scenic River in Colorado is:

- Cache la Poudre Wild and Scenic River

=== Areas of Critical Environmental Concern ===
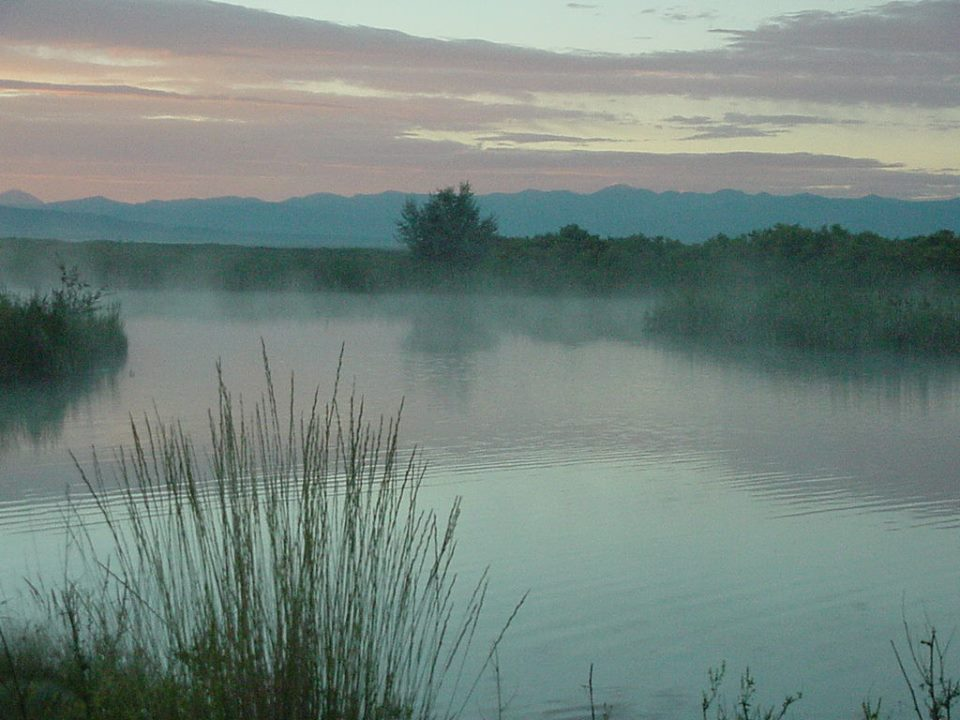
The Blanca Wetlands ACEC.

The Bureau of Land Management has designated 88 Areas of Critical Environmental Concern in western Colorado.

== State lands ==
=== Colorado State Parks ===
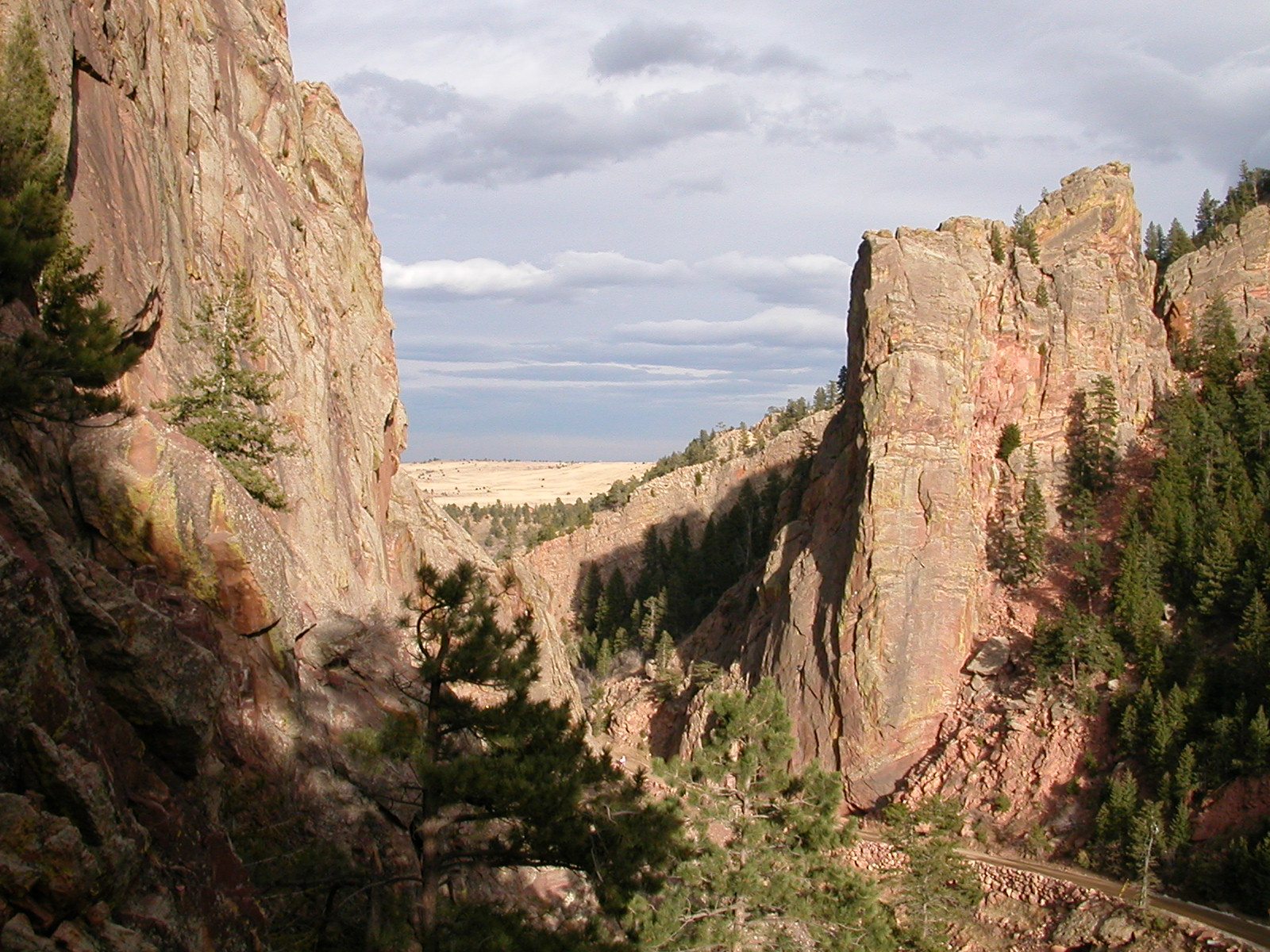
Eldorado Canyon State Park.

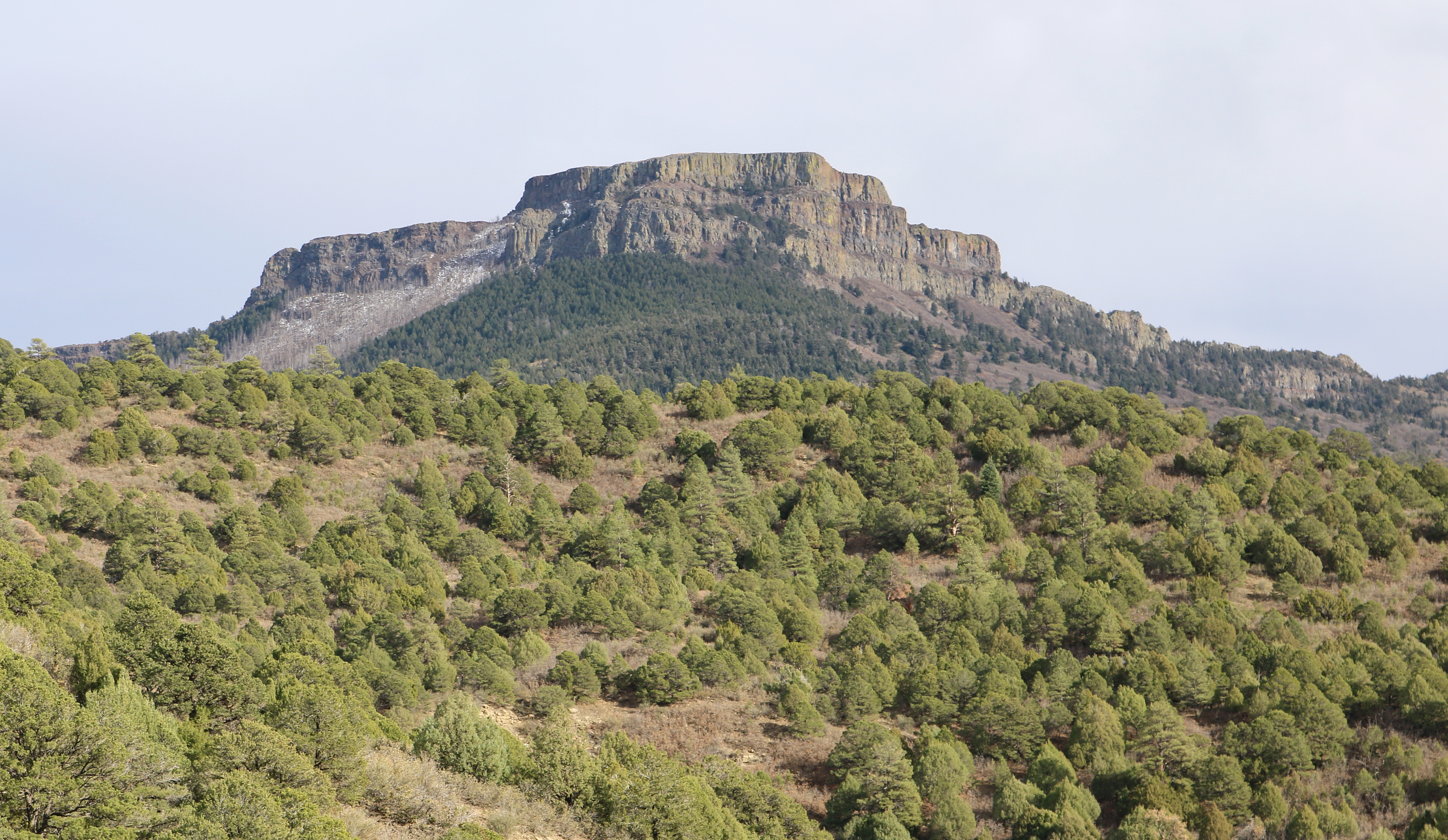
Fishers Peak State Park.

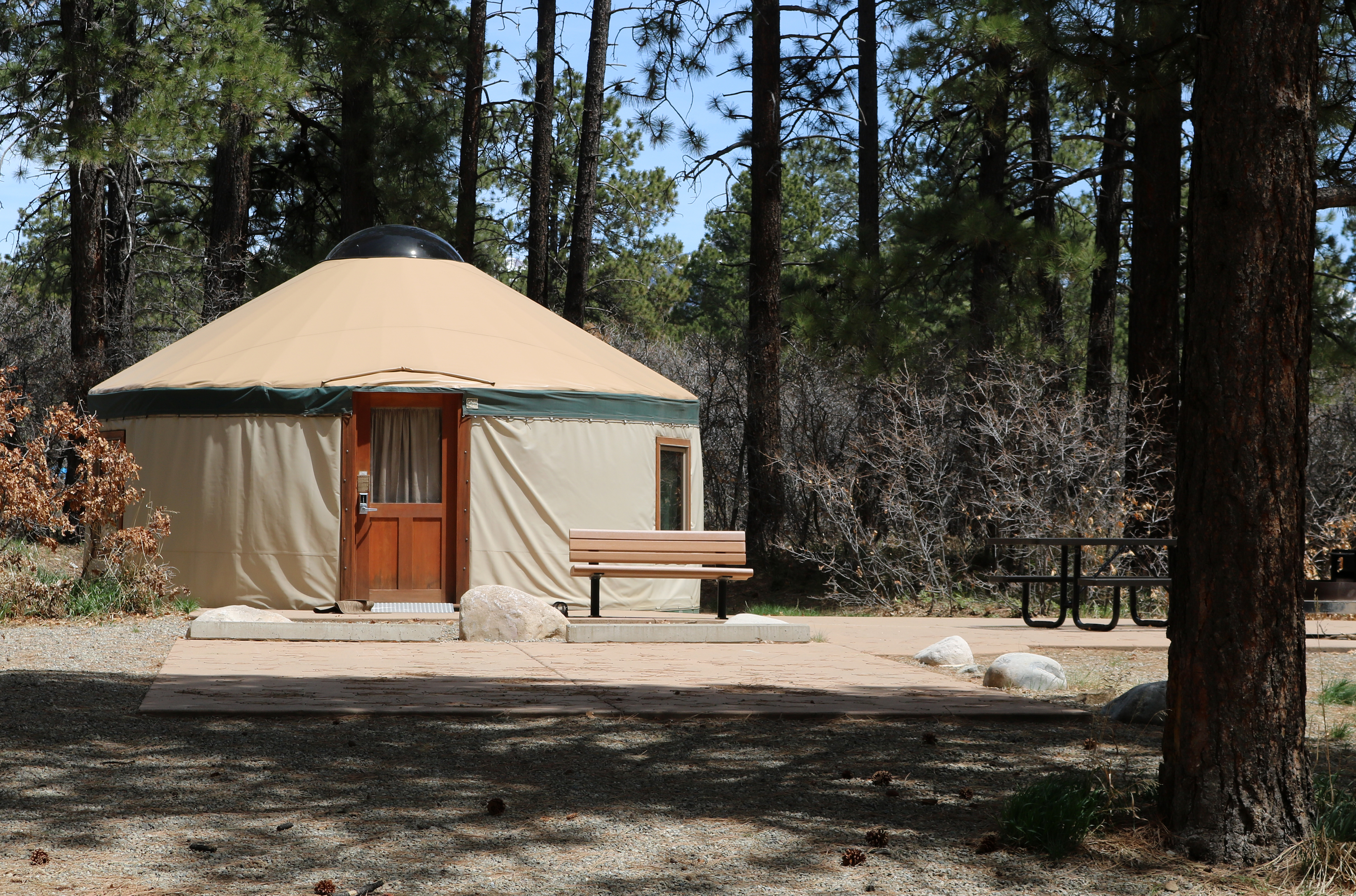
A yurt in Mancos State Park.

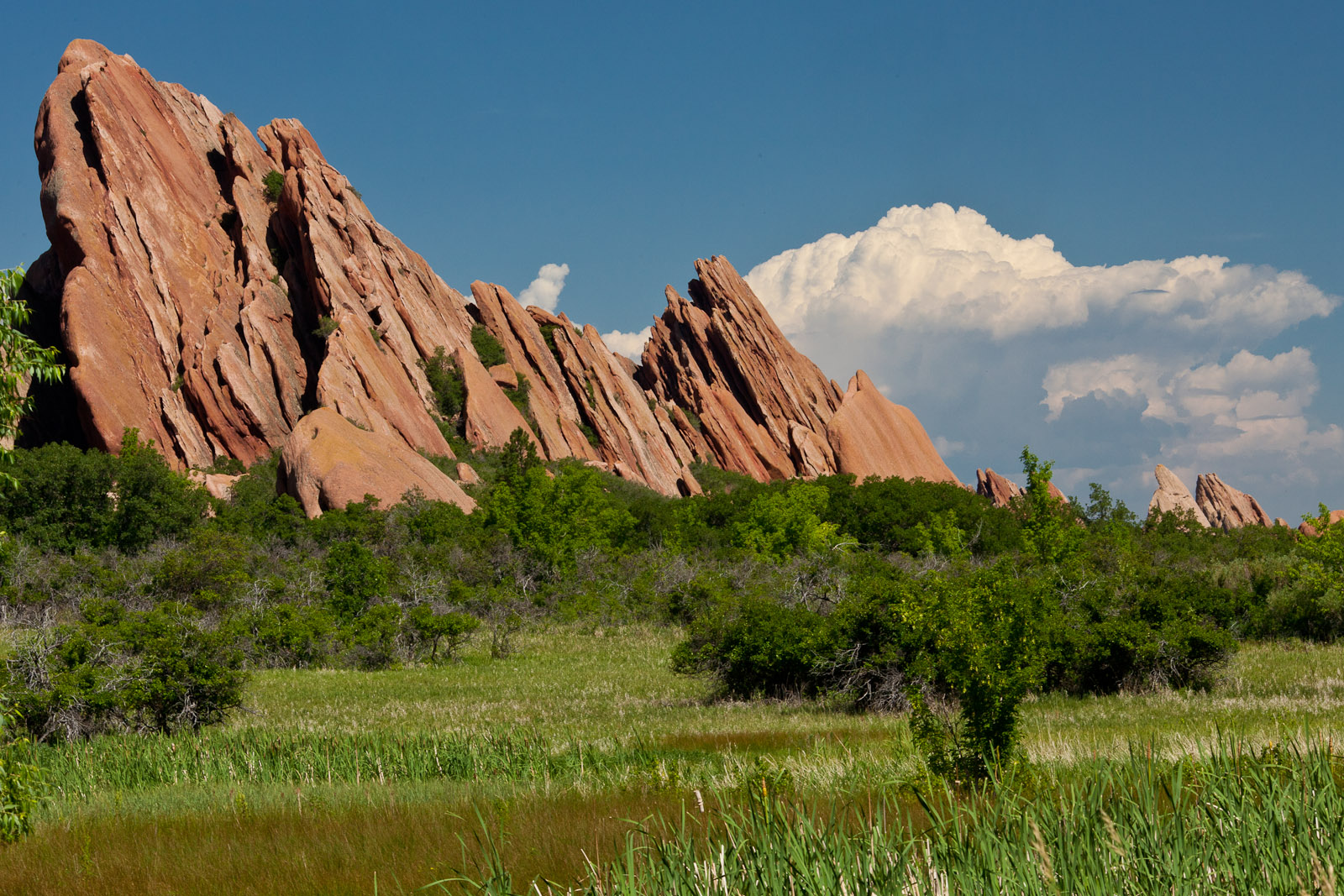
Roxborough State Park.

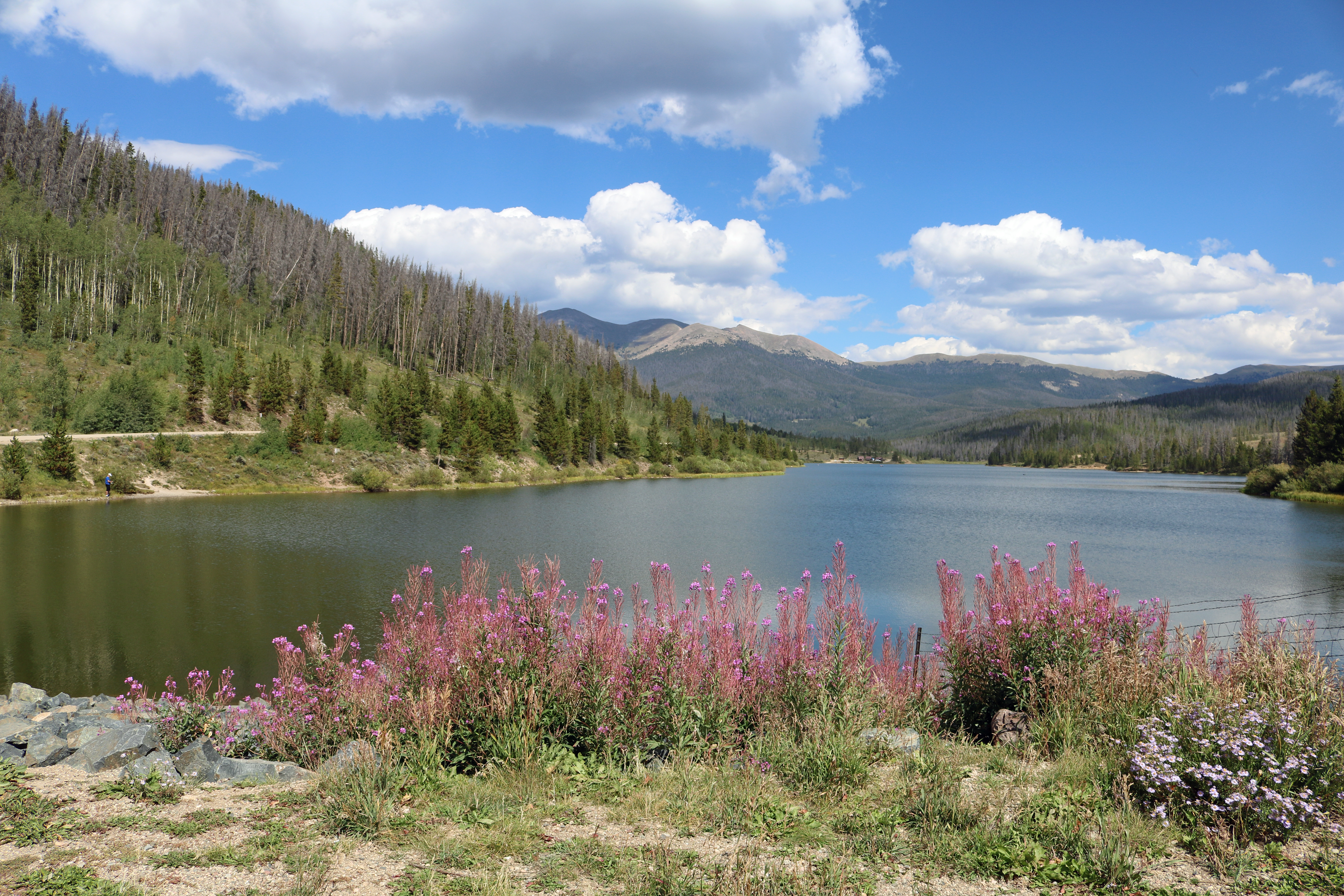
State Forest State Park.

Colorado Parks and Wildlife manages the 43 Colorado State Parks.

- Arkansas Headwaters Recreation Area
- Barr Lake State Park
- Boyd Lake State Park
- Castlewood Canyon State Park
- Chatfield State Park
- Cherry Creek State Park
- Cheyenne Mountain State Park
- Crawford State Park (Colorado)
- Eldorado Canyon State Park
- Eleven Mile State Park
- Elkhead State Park
- Fishers Peak State Park
- Golden Gate Canyon State Park
- Harvey Gap State Park
- Highline Lake State Park
- Jackson Lake State Park (Colorado)
- James M. Robb – Colorado River State Park
- John Martin Reservoir State Park
- Lake Pueblo State Park
- Lathrop State Park
- Lone Mesa State Park
- Lory State Park
- Mancos State Park
- Mueller State Park
- Navajo State Park
- North Sterling State Park
- Paonia State Park
- Pearl Lake State Park
- Ridgway State Park
- Rifle Falls State Park
- Rifle Gap State Park
- Roxborough State Park
- Spinney Mountain State Park
- St. Vrain State Park
- Stagecoach State Park
- State Forest State Park
- Staunton State Park
- Steamboat Lake State Park
- Sweitzer Lake State Park
- Sweetwater Lake State Park
- Sylvan Lake State Park
- Trinidad Lake State Park
- Vega State Park
- Yampa River State Park

=== Colorado Wildlife Areas ===
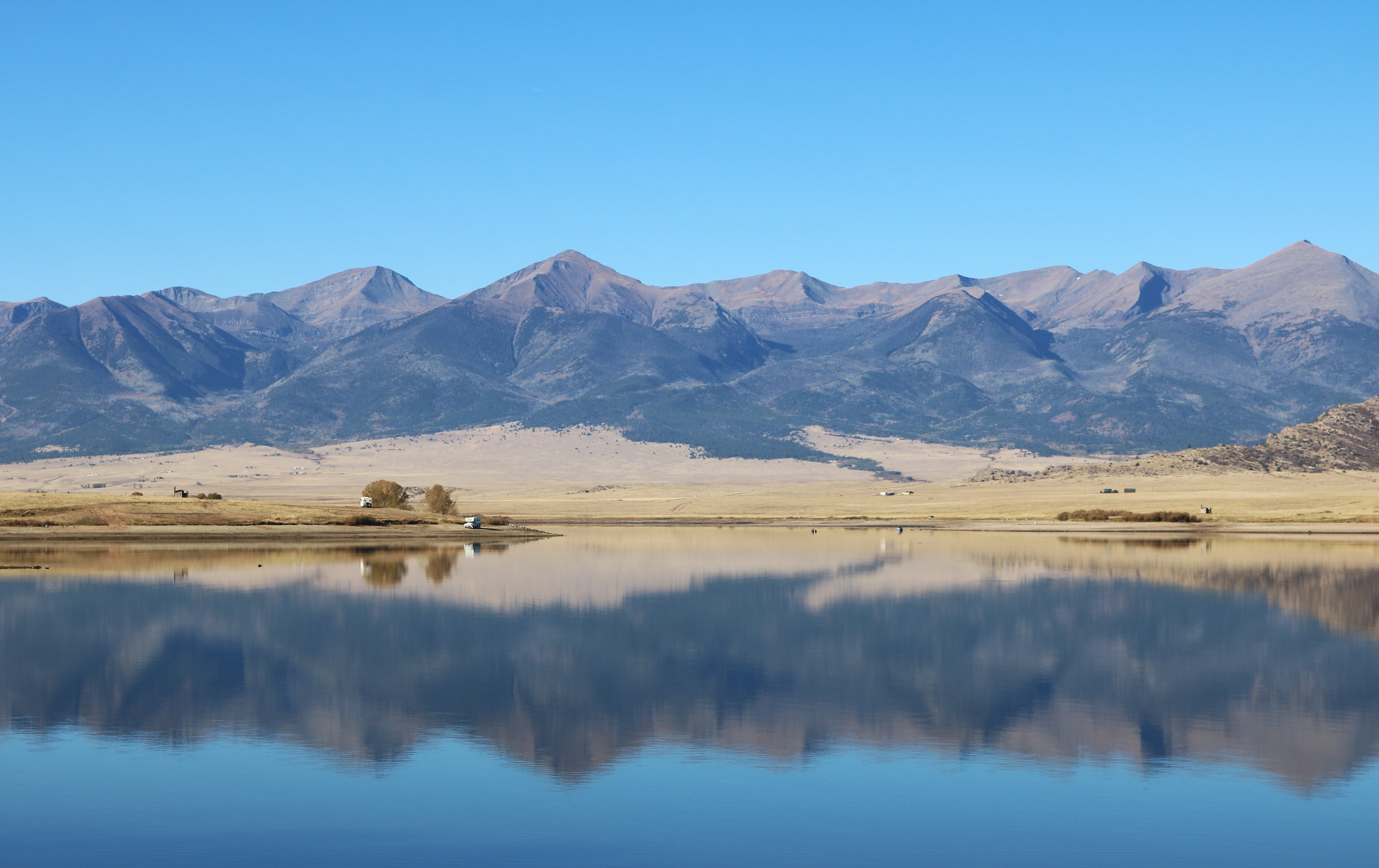
DeWeese Reservoir State Wildlife Area.

Colorado Parks and Wildlife manages the 307 Colorado State Wildlife Areas.

== State designated areas ==
=== Colorado Natural Areas ===
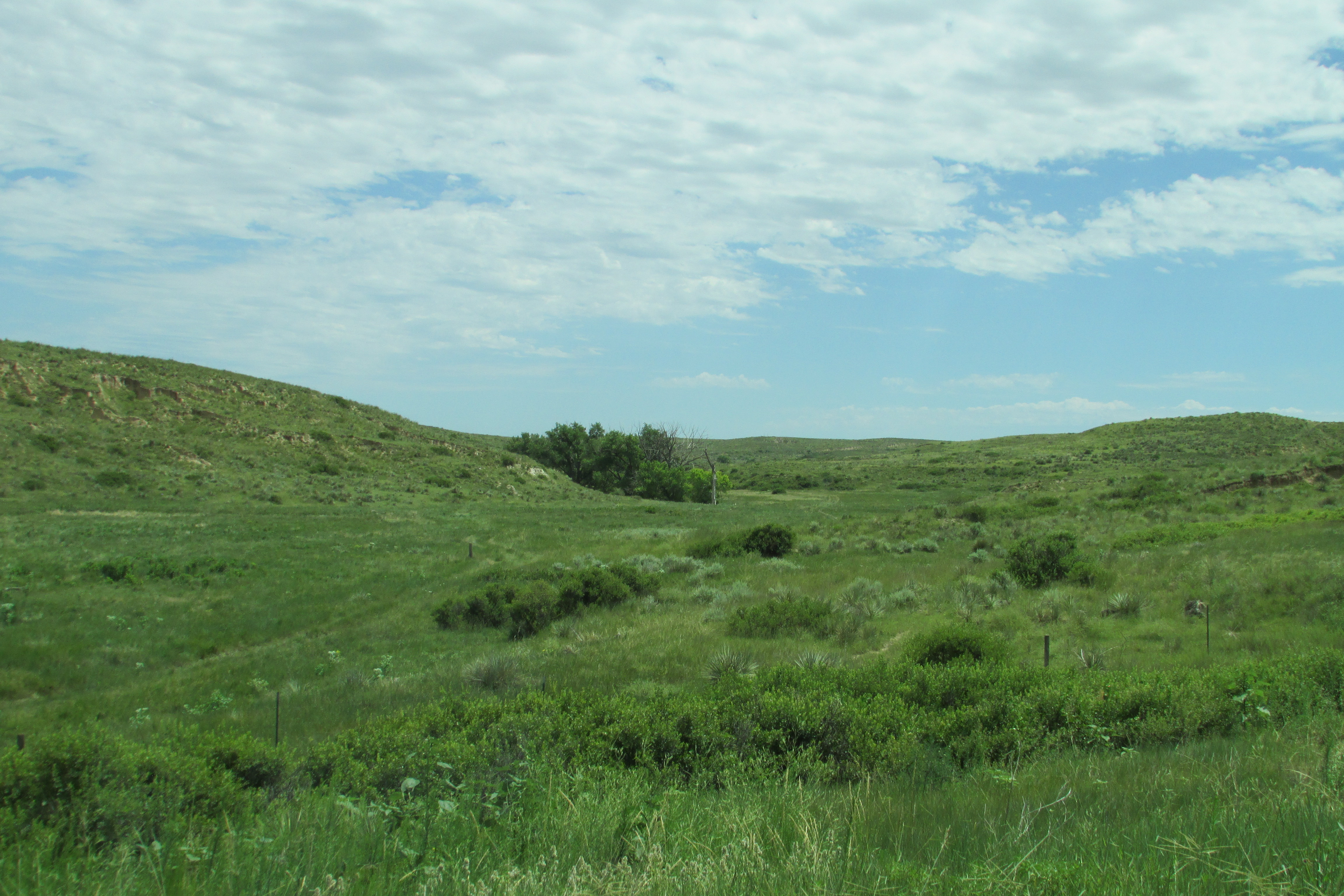
The Arikaree River Natural Area.

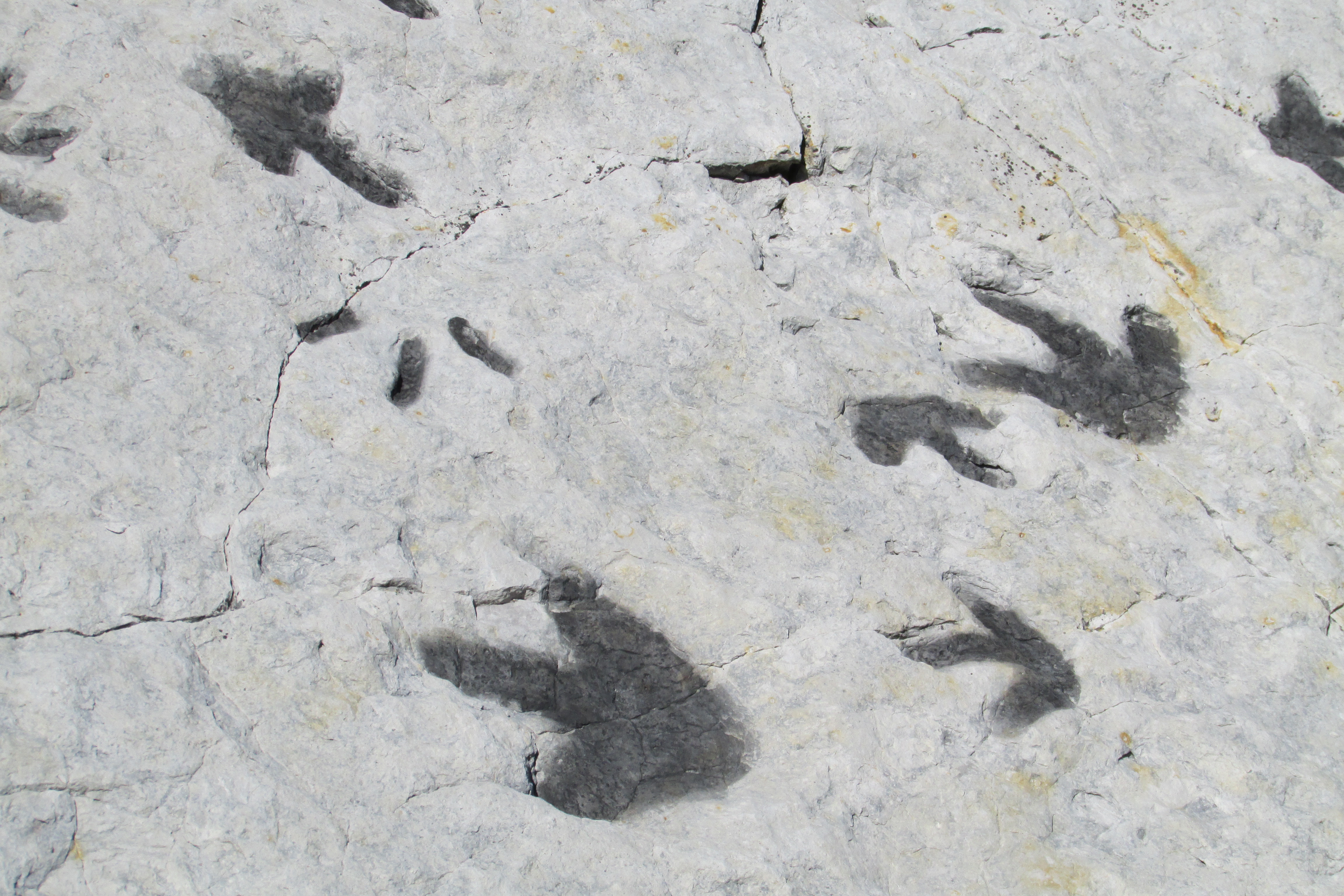
Dinosaur tracks in the Dakota Hogback Natural Area.

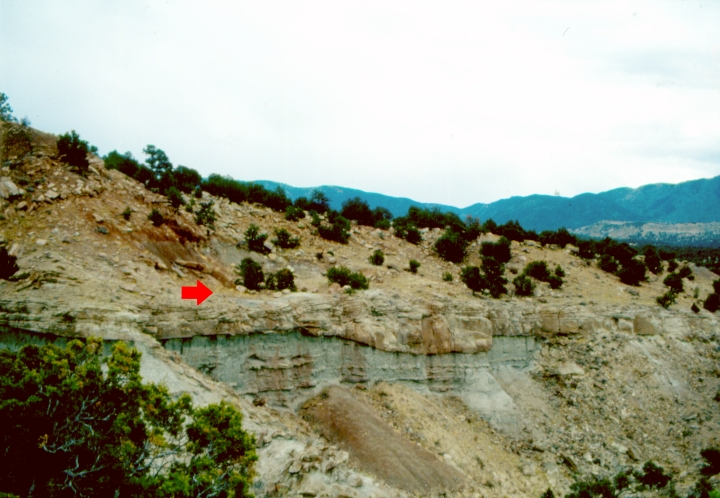
The Garden Park Fossil Locality.

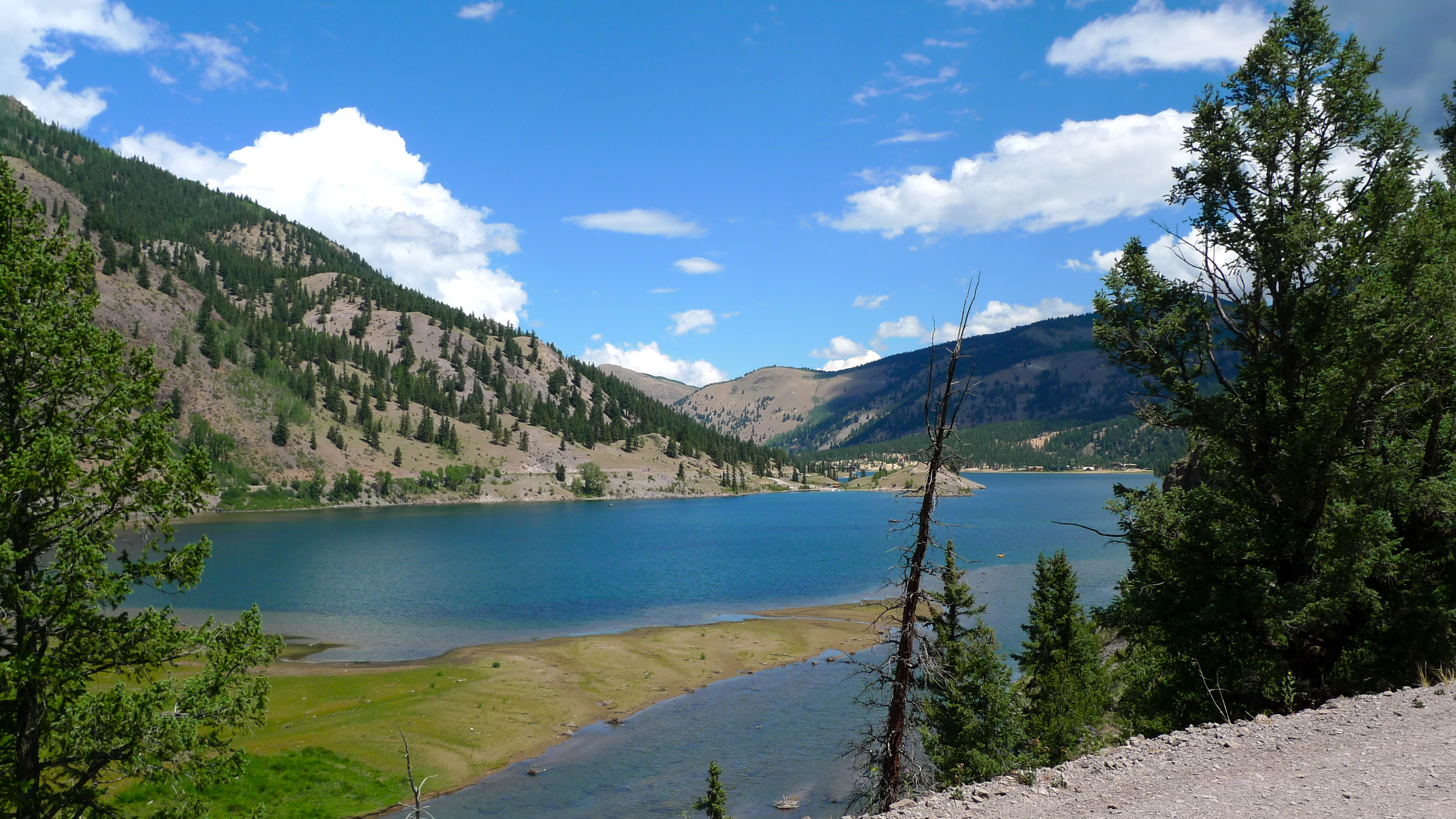
The Lake San Cristobal Natural Area.

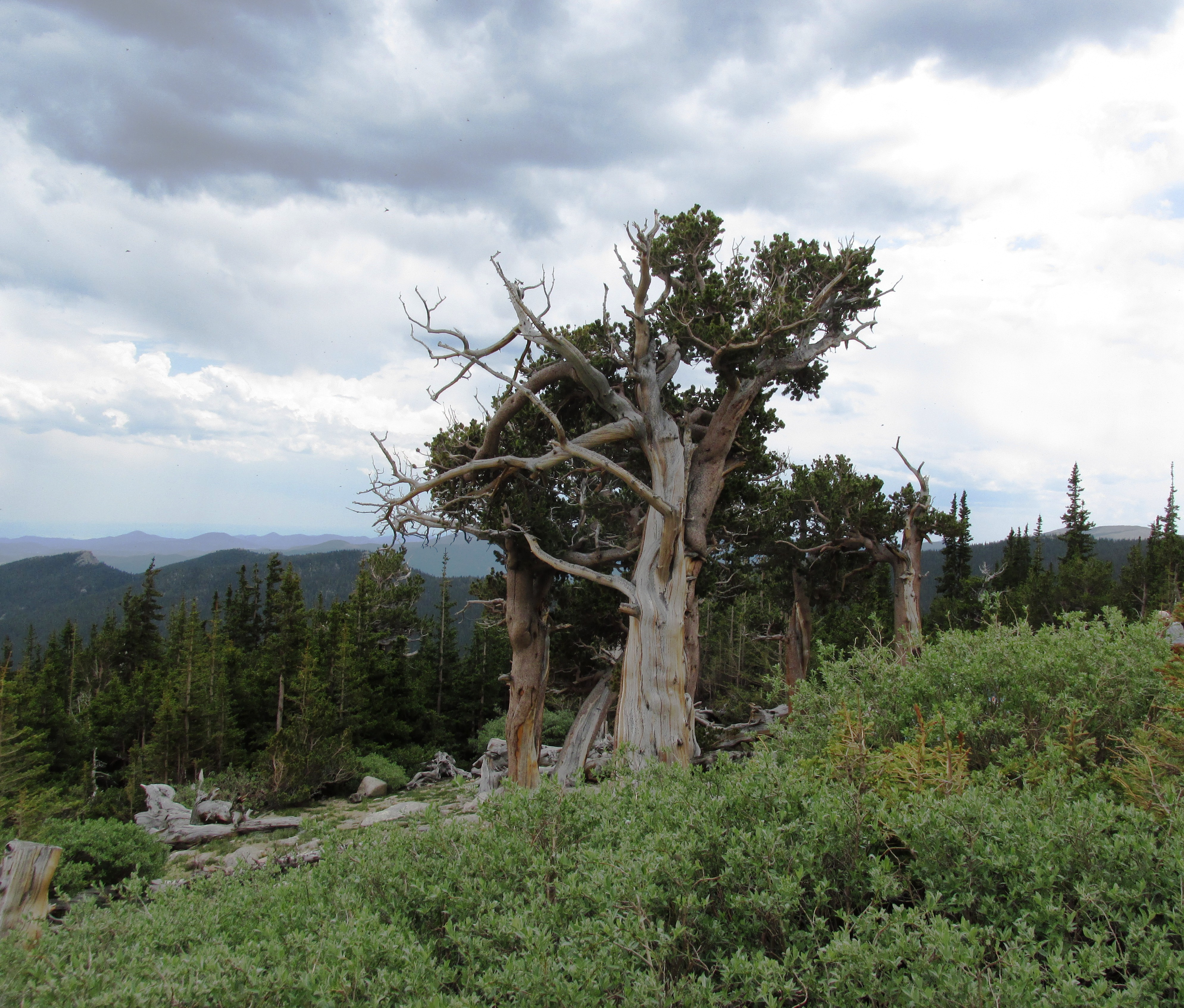
The Mount Goliath Natural Area.

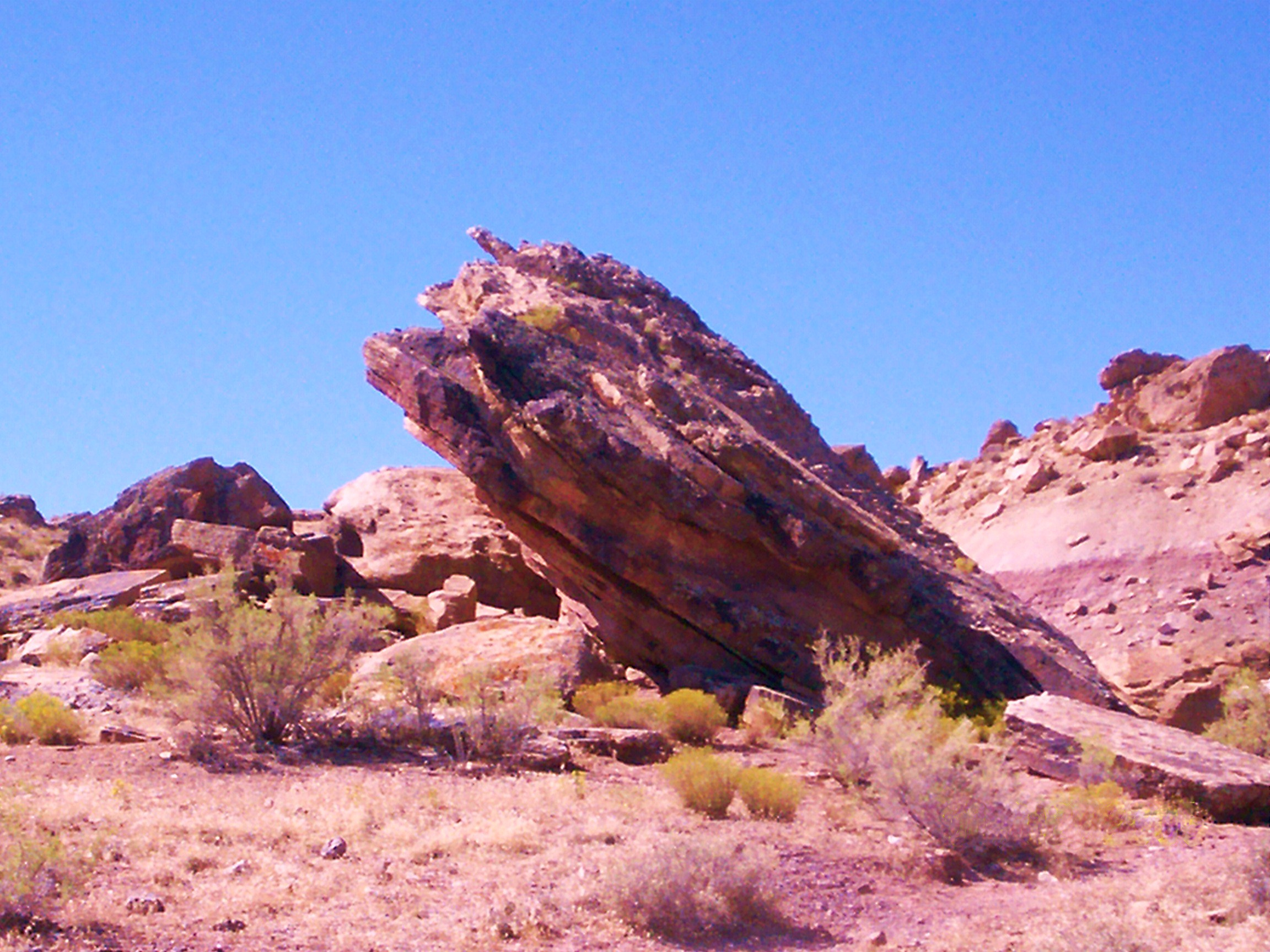
The Rabbit Valley Natural Area.

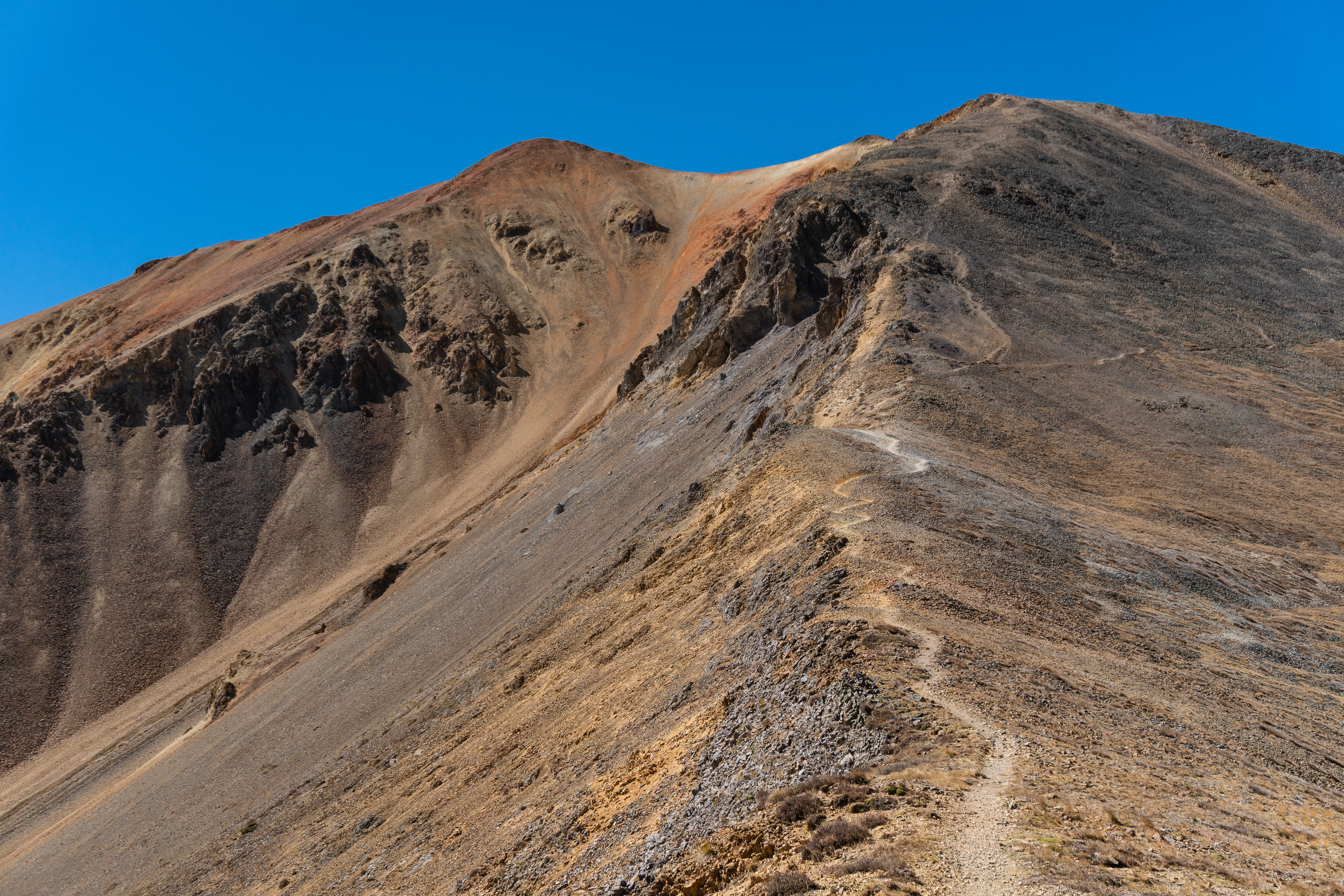
The Redcloud Peak Natural Area.

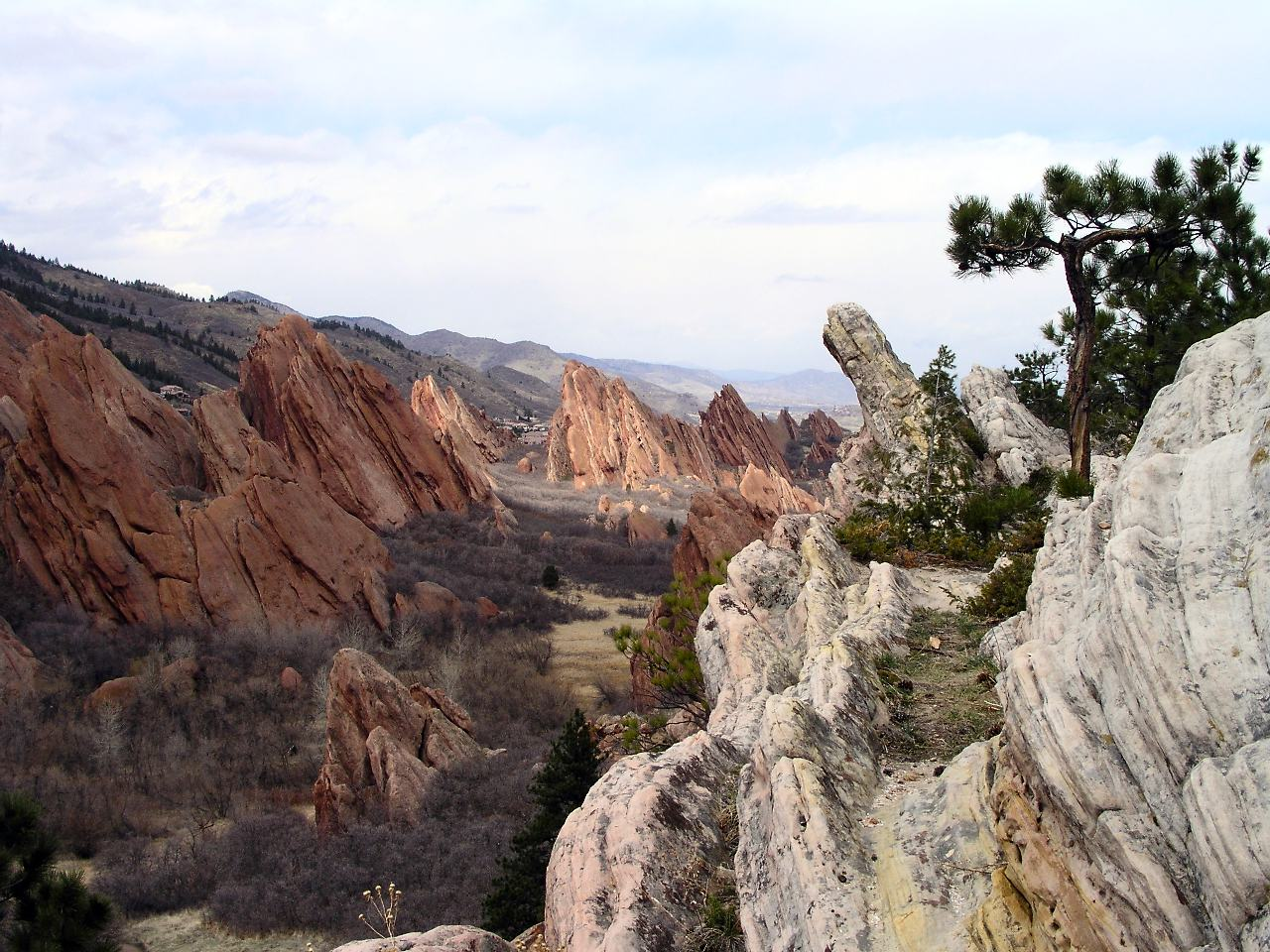
The Roxborough Natural Area.

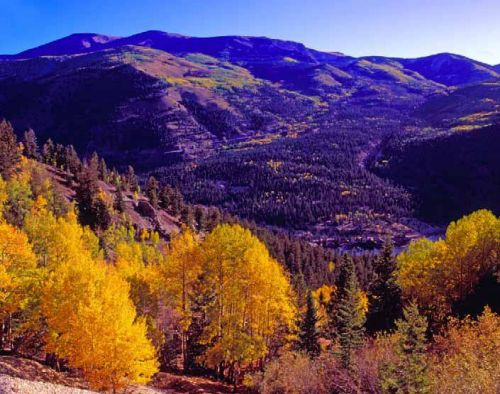
The Slumgullion Earthflow Natural Area.

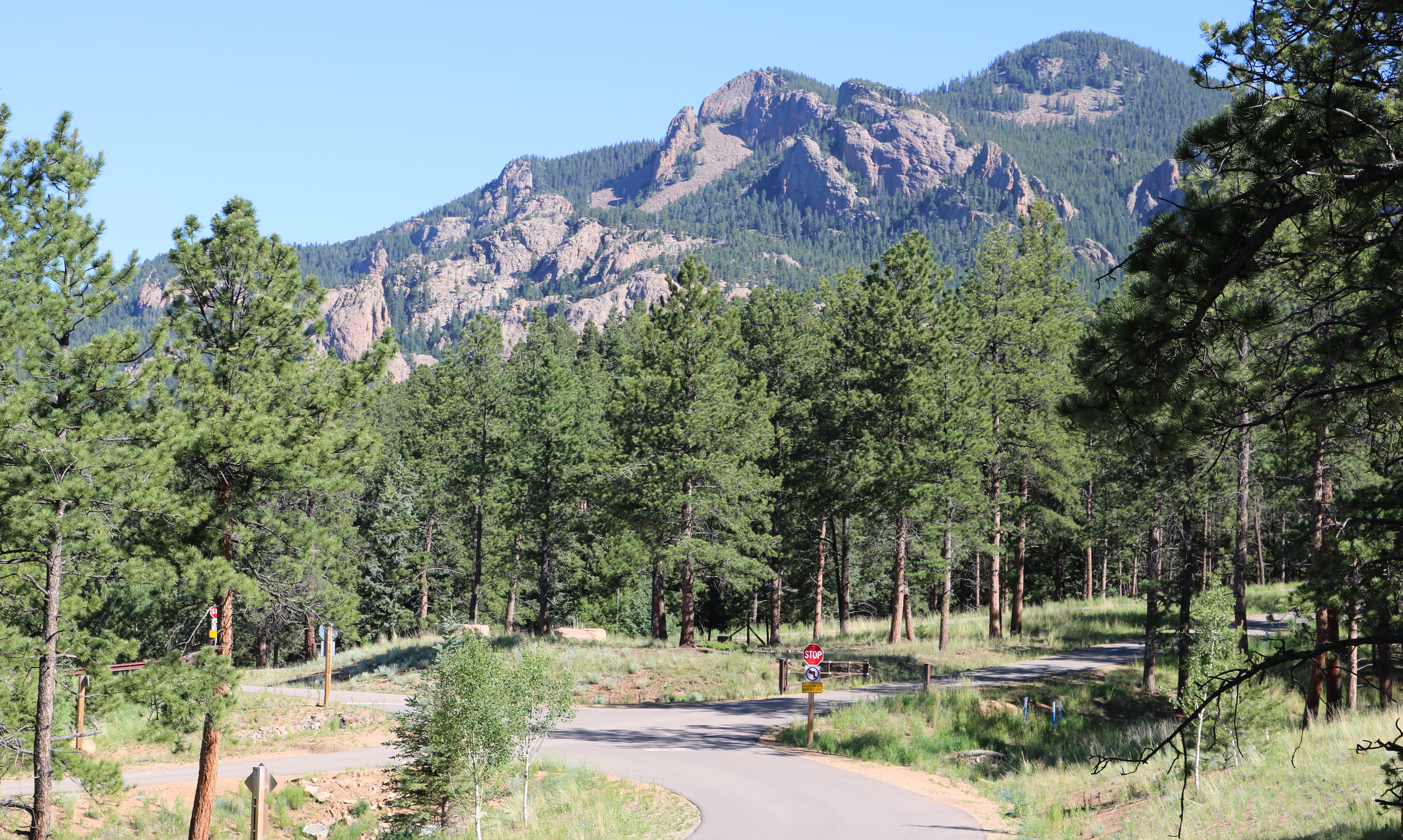
The Staunton Natural Area.

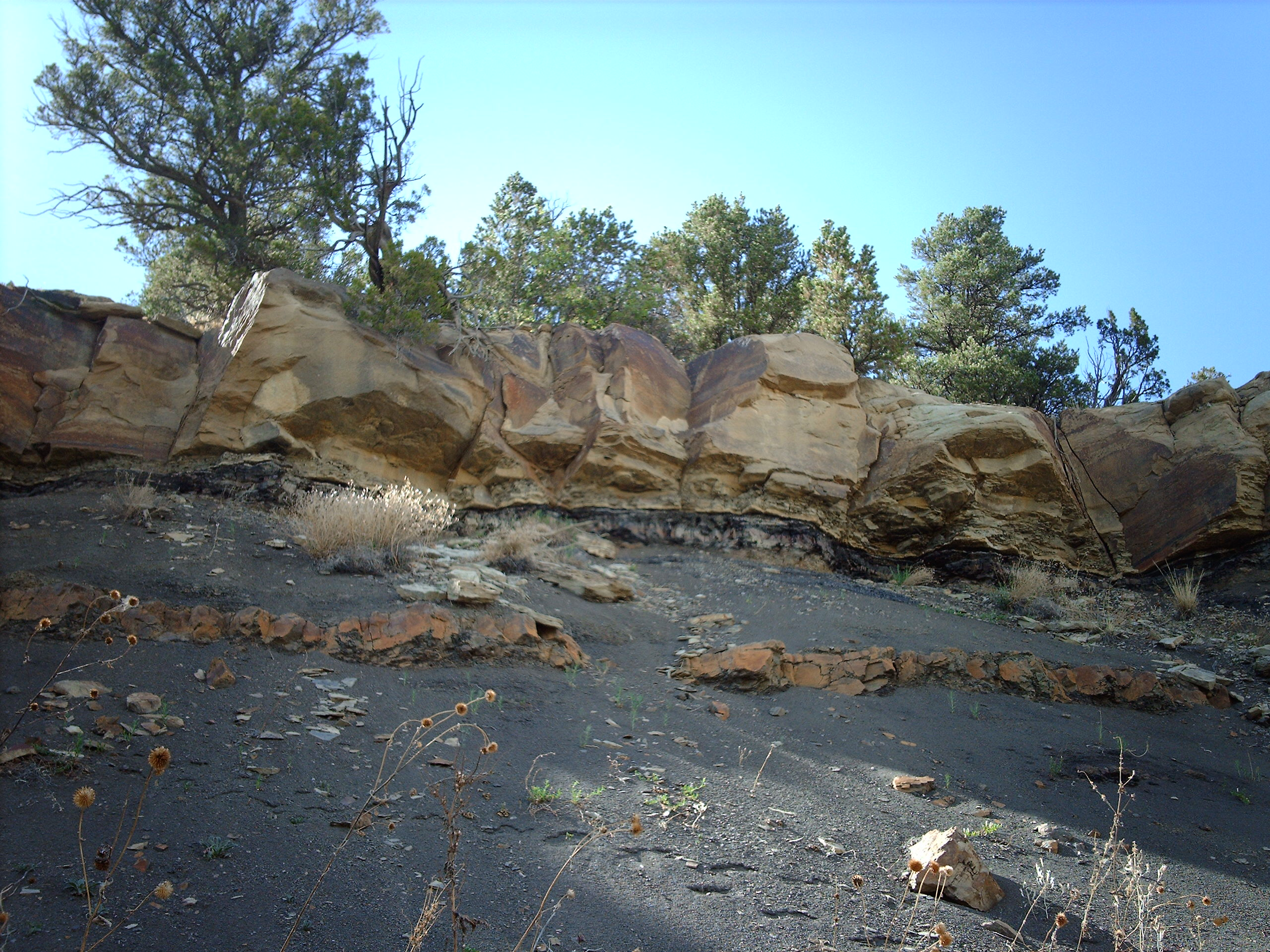
Exposed Cretaceous–Paleogene boundary at the Trinidad K-T Boundary Natural Area.

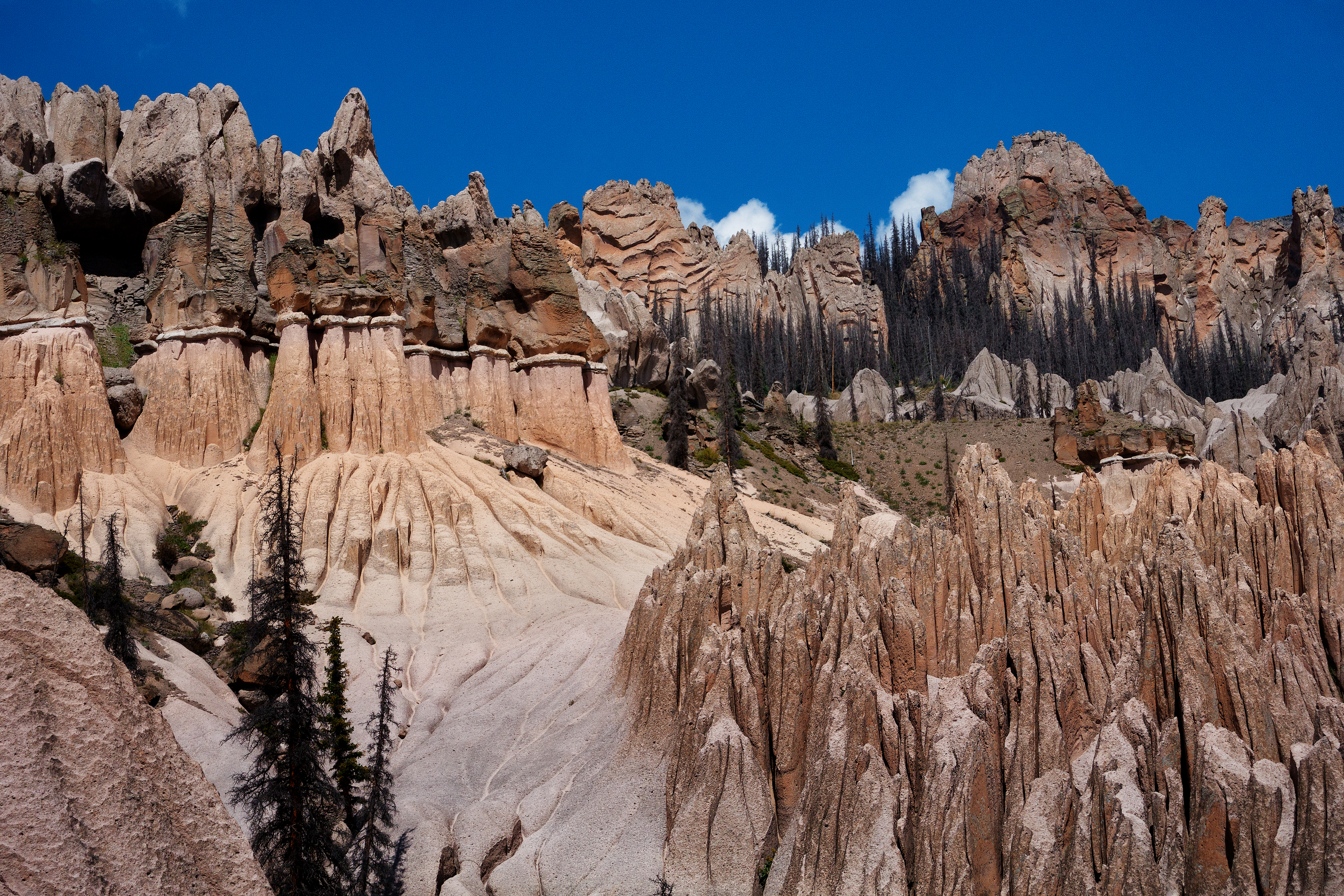
The Wheeler Geologic Natural Area.

The Colorado Department of Natural Resources has designated 95 Colorado Natural Areas.

- Aiken Canyon Natural Area
- Antero-Salt Creek Natural Area
- Arikaree River Natural Area
- Badger Wash Natural Area
- Blacks Gulch Natural Area
- Blue Mountain Natural Area
- Bonny Prairie Natural Area
- Boulder Mountain Park Natural Area in Boulder Mountain Park
- Brush Creek Fen Natural Area
- California Park Natural Area
- Castlewood Canyon Natural Area in Castlewood Canyon State Park
- Chalk Bluffs Natural Area
- Colorado Tallgrass Prairie Natural Area
- Comanche Grassland Lesser Prairie Chicken Natural Area in Comanche National Grassland
- Copeland Willow Carr Natural Area
- Corral Bluffs Natural Area
- Cross Mountain Canyon Natural Area
- Dakota Hogback Natural Area commonly known as Dinosaur Ridge in Matthews/Winters Park
- Deer Gulch Natural Area
- Dome Rock Natural Area in Dome Rock State Wildlife Area
- Droney Gulch Natural Area
- Duck Creek Natural Area
- Dudley Bluffs Natural Area
- East Lost Park Natural Area in Pike National Forest
- East Sand Dunes Natural Area in State Forest State Park
- Elephant Rocks Natural Area
- Escalante Canyon Natural Area
- Fairview Natural Area
- Fourmile Creek Natural Area
- Fruita Paleontological Locality
- Garden Park Fossil Locality
- Gateway Palisade Natural Area
- Geneva Basin Iron Fens Natural Area
- Gothic Research Natural Area in Gunnison National Forest
- Gunnison Gravels Research Natural Area
- Haviland Lake Natural Area in Haviland Lake State Wildlife Area
- High Creek Fen Natural Area
- High Mesa Grassland Natural Area
- Hoosier Ridge Research Natural Area on the Continental Divide in Pike National Forest and White River National Forest
- Hurricane Canyon Natural Area in Pike National Forest
- Indian Spring Natural Area
- Indian Springs Trace Fossil Locality
- Irish Canyon Natural Area
- Jimmy Creek Natural Area
- Ken-Caryl Ranch Natural Area
- Kremmling Cretaceous Ammonite Locality
- Limestone Ridge Natural Area
- Logan Wash Mine Natural Area
- Lookout Mountain Natural Area
- Lower Greasewood Creek Natural Area
- McElmo Natural Area
- Mexican Cut Natural Area
- Mini-Wheeler Natural Area
- Miramonte Reservoir Natural Area in Dan Noble State Wildlife Area
- Mishak Lakes Natural Area
- Mount Callahan Natural Area
- Mount Callahan Saddle Natural Area
- Mount Emmons Iron Fen Natural Area in Gunnison National Forest
- Mount Goliath Natural Area in Arapaho National Forest
- Narraguinnep Natural Area in San Juan National Forest
- Needle Rock Natural Area
- North Park Phacelia Natural Area
- Orient Mine Natural Area
- Owl Canyon Pinyon Grove Natural Area
- Pagosa Skyrocket Natural Area
- Paradise Park Natural Area in Rocky Mountain National Park
- Park Creek Hogback Natural Area
- Pyramid Rock Natural Area
- Rabbit Valley Natural Area
- Rajadero Canyon Natural Area
- Raven Ridge Natural Area
- Redcloud Peak Natural Area
- Rough Canyon Natural Area
- Roxborough Natural Area in and near Roxborough State Park
- Ryan Gulch Natural Area
- Saddle Mountain Natural Area in Pike National Forest
- San Miguel River at Tabeguache Creek Natural Area
- Sand Creek Natural Area
- Shell Duck Creek Natural Area
- Shell Rock Natural Area
- Slumgullion Earthflow Natural Area in San Juan National Forest
- South Beaver Creek Natural Area
- South Boulder Creek Natural Area
- South Cathedral Bluffs Natural Area
- Specimen Mountain Research Natural Area in Rocky Mountain National Park
- Staunton Natural Area in Staunton State Park
- Tamarack Ranch Natural Area in Tamarack Ranch State Wildlife Area
- Treasurevault Mountain Natural Area
- Trinidad K-T Boundary Natural Area in Trinidad Lake State Park
- Two Buttes Natural Area
- Unaweep Seep Research Natural Area
- Wacker Ranch Natural Area
- West Creek Natural Area in Rocky Mountain National Park
- Wheeler Geologic Natural Area in the La Garita Wilderness of Rio Grande National Forest
- White Rocks Natural Area
- Yanks Gulch/Upper Greasewood Creek Natural Area
- Zapata Falls Natural Area

== Regional trails ==
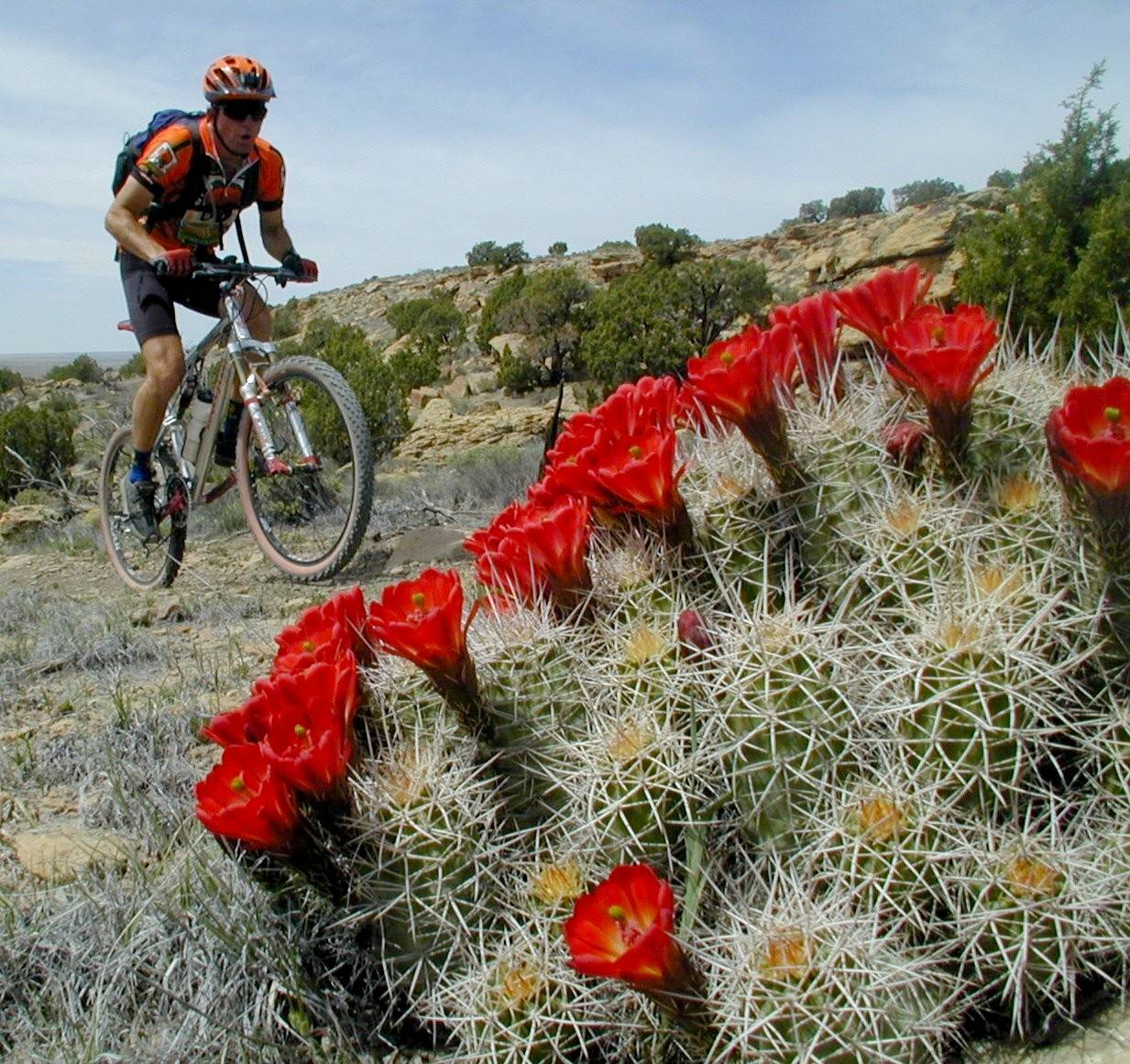
A cyclist on the Kokopelli Trail in McInnis Canyons National Conservation Area.

The following transcontinental hiking trail was established by the American Discovery Trail Society.

- American Discovery Trail

The following hiking trail across the Southern Rocky Mountains is maintained by the Colorado Trail Foundation.

- Colorado Trail

The following three single-track mountain bike trails are maintained by the Colorado Plateau Mountain Bike Trail Association and the Bureau of Land Management.

- Kokopelli Trail
- Paradox Trail
- Tabeguache Trail

== Bicycle routes ==
Hoosier Pass on the TransAmerica Trail Bicycle Route.

The following four bicycle touring routes through Colorado were developed and mapped by the Adventure Cycling Association.

- Great Divide Mountain Bike Route
- Great Parks Bicycle Route
- TransAmerica Trail Bicycle Route
- Western Express Bicycle Route

== See also ==
- Protected areas of the United States
- List of national conservation lands in Colorado
- Bibliography of Colorado
- Geography of Colorado
- History of Colorado
- Index of Colorado-related articles
- List of Colorado-related lists
- Outline of Colorado
