= List of Colorado natural areas =

Coordinates: 38.9972°N 105.5478°W

The location of the State of Colorado in the United States of America.

The U.S. State of Colorado has designated 96 natural areas of the state for special protection, as of 2023. The Colorado Natural Areas Program was established in 1977 to preserve and protect special areas of the state with distinctive flora, fauna, ecological, geological, and paleontologic features. It is a program of Colorado Parks and Wildlife that identifies and protects public, and in some cases private, areas with at least one unique or high-quality natural feature of statewide significance. Land management agreements are made with landowners concerning private property.

== Natural areas ==
The Colorado Natural Areas are:

- Aiken Canyon Natural Area
- Antero-Salt Creek Natural Area
- Arikaree River Natural Area
- Badger Wash Natural Area
- Blacks Gulch Natural Area
- Blue Mountain-Little Thompson Fault Natural Area
- Bonny Prairie Natural Area
- Boulder Mountain Park Natural Area in Boulder Mountain Park
- Brush Creek Fen Natural Area
- California Park Natural Area
- Castlewood Canyon Natural Area in Castlewood Canyon State Park
- Chalk Bluffs Natural Area
- Coal Creek Tallgrass Prairie
- Colorado Tallgrass Prairie Natural Area
- Comanche Grassland Lesser Prairie Chicken Natural Area in Comanche National Grassland
- Copeland Willow Carr Natural Area
- Corral Bluffs Natural Area
- Cross Mountain Canyon Natural Area
- Dakota Hogback Natural Area commonly known as Dinosaur Ridge in Matthews/Winters Park
- Deer Gulch Natural Area
- Dome Rock Natural Area in Dome Rock State Wildlife Area
- Droney Gulch Natural Area
- Duck Creek Natural Area
- Dudley Bluffs Natural Area
- East Lost Park Natural Area in Pike National Forest
- East Sand Dunes Natural Area in State Forest State Park
- Elephant Rocks Natural Area
- Escalante Canyon Natural Area
- Fairview Natural Area
- Fourmile Creek Natural Area
- Fruita Paleontological Locality
- Garden Park Fossil Locality
- Gateway Palisade Natural Area
- Geneva Basin Iron Fens Natural Area
- Gothic Research Natural Area in Gunnison National Forest
- Gunnison Gravels Research Natural Area
- Haviland Lake Natural Area in Haviland Lake State Wildlife Area
- High Creek Fen Natural Area
- High Mesa Grassland Natural Area
- Hoosier Ridge Research Natural Area on the Continental Divide in Pike National Forest and White River National Forest
- Hurricane Canyon Natural Area in Pike National Forest
- Indian Spring Natural Area
- Indian Springs Trace Fossil Locality
- Irish Canyon Natural Area
- Jimmy Creek Natural Area
- Ken-Caryl Ranch Natural Area
- Kremmling Cretaceous Ammonite Locality
- Limestone Ridge Natural Area
- Lookout Mountain Natural Area
- Lower Greasewood Creek Natural Area
- McElmo Natural Area
- Mexican Cut Natural Area
- Mini-Wheeler Natural Area
- Miramonte Reservoir Natural Area in Dan Noble State Wildlife Area
- Mishak Lakes Natural Area
- Mount Callahan & Logan Wash Mine Natural Area
- Mount Emmons Iron Bog Natural Area in Gunnison National Forest
- Mount Goliath Natural Area in Arapaho National Forest
- Narraguinnep Natural Area in San Juan National Forest
- Needle Rock Natural Area
- North Park Phacelia Natural Area
- Orient Mine Natural Area
- Owl Canyon Pinyon Grove Natural Area
- Pagosa Skyrocket Natural Area
- Paradise Park Natural Area in Rocky Mountain National Park
- Park Creek Hogback Natural Area
- Pyramid Rock Natural Area
- Rabbit Valley Natural Area
- Rajadero Canyon Natural Area
- Raven Ridge Natural Area
- Redcloud Peak Natural Area
- Rough Canyon Natural Area
- Roxborough Natural Area in and near Roxborough State Park
- Ryan Gulch Natural Area
- Saddle Mountain Natural Area in Pike National Forest
- San Miguel River at Tabeguache Creek Natural Area
- Sand Creek Natural Area
- Shell Duck Creek Natural Area
- Shell Rock Natural Area
- Slumgullion Earthflow Natural Area in San Juan National Forest
- South Beaver Creek Natural Area
- South Boulder Creek Natural Area
- South Cathedral Bluffs Natural Area
- Specimen Mountain Research Natural Area in Rocky Mountain National Park
- Staunton Natural Area in Staunton State Park
- Tamarack Ranch Natural Area in Tamarack Ranch State Wildlife Area
- Treasurevault Mountain Natural Area
- Trinidad K-T Boundary Natural Area in Trinidad Lake State Park
- Two Buttes Natural Area
- Unaweep Seep Research Natural Area
- Wacker Ranch Natural Area
- West Creek Natural Area in Rocky Mountain National Park
- Wheeler Geologic Natural Area in the La Garita Wilderness of Rio Grande National Forest
- White Rocks Natural Area
- Yanks Gulch/Upper Greasewood Creek Natural Area
- Zapata Falls Natural Area

== See also ==
- List of protected areas of Colorado
- Bibliography of Colorado
- Geography of Colorado
- History of Colorado
- Index of Colorado-related articles
- List of Colorado-related lists
- Outline of Colorado
