= Paradise Park =

Paradise Park may refer to the following places:

== Shopping mall in Thailand ==
- Paradise Park (mall) in eastern Bangkok

== Wildlife parks in the United Kingdom ==
- Paradise Park, Cornwall - located in Hayle
- Paradise Park, London - located in the Borough of Islington
- Paradise Park, Newhaven - located in Newhaven, East Sussex
- Paradise Wildlife Park - located in Broxbourne, Hertfordshire

== United States ==
- Paradise Park, California
- Paradise Park, California, alternate name of El Campo, California
- Paradise Park, Florida, a segregation-era tourist attraction
- Paradise Park, Georgia
- Paradise Park, a former theme park adjacent to Lyon Arboretum, Hawaii
- Hawaiian Paradise Park, Hawaii
- Paradise Park, Missouri
- Paradise Park (amusement park), New York, defunct
- Paradise Park in Windsor, Vermont including Runnemede Lake
- Paradise Park Historic District in Thomasville, Georgia
- Paradise Park Natural Area, a protected area of Rocky Mountain National Park in Colorado
