= East Rifle Creek =

- The creek at Rifle Falls (2026)

- Location of the mouth in Colorado

Location
- Countries: United States
- States: Colorado
- Counties: Garfield

Physical characteristics
- Source
  - location: Garfield County, Colorado
  - coordinates: 39°48′32.93″N 107°38′40.22″W
- Mouth: Rifle Gap Reservoir
  - location: Delta County, Colorado
  - coordinates: 39°37′33.93″N 107°45′37.23″W
- Length: 19 miles (31 kilometers)

Basin features
- Progression: Rifle Creek → Colorado
- Tributaries
  - left: Dry Rifle Creek
  - right: Three Forks Creek; Salt Creek
- Waterfalls: Rifle Falls at Rifle Falls State Park

East Rifle Creek is a tributary of Rifle Creek in Garfield County, Colorado, U.S. The creek joins West Rifle Creek at Rifle Gap Reservoir to form Rifle Creek. East Rifle Creek creates Rifle Falls at Rifle Falls State Park and supplies water to an important irrigation canal.

== Course ==
=== Headwaters ===
The creek rises in far northern Garfield County in the White River National Forest. From there it flows south through a narrow canyon and passes through Rifle Mountain Park.

=== Fish hatchery ===
Next it continues south, passing by the Rifle Falls Fish Hatchery. In the past the creek supplied water to the hatchery, but now the hatchery gets water at the rate of 15 cubic feet (0.42 cubic meters) per second from a nearby spring, reducing the chance of introducing diseases from the creek into the hatchery and of spreading them downstream.

=== State park ===
Next the creek goes over Rifle Falls in Rifle Falls State Park. Three separate falls make up Rifle Falls where the creek goes over a dam composed of travertine calcium carbonate, part of the Leadville Limestone formation.

=== Diversion ===
After the falls, the creek enters a channelized section and comes to a diversion dam. Here, much of the creek's flow is diverted to the Grass Valley Canal, where much of it is conveyed to Grass Valley Reservoir at Harvey Gap State Park and stored. Used to supply water for agricultural purposes, the canal is owned and managed by the Silt Water Conservancy District. Creek water that does not get diverted into the canal falls down a spillway and continues downstream through the state park and to the south.

=== Rifle Gap Reservoir ===
Finally, the creek flows into Rifle Gap Reservoir at Rifle Gap State Park. Here it merges with West Fork Rifle Creek to form Rifle Creek. Before the Rifle Gap Dam was built, the two creeks' confluence was at a point just below where the dam now sits.

== See also ==
- List of rivers of Colorado
