= List of Colorado state parks =

Coordinates: 38.9972°N 105.5478°W

Locations of the Colorado State Parks.

This is a list of the state parks in the U.S. State of Colorado. Colorado Parks and Wildlife manages the state park system to accommodate both outdoor recreation and tourism. There are currently forty-two parks open to the public, and there are others in development. Colorado State Parks host over eleven million visitors each year.

Colorado Parks and Wildlife also takes the lead in managing Colorado's boating, off-highway vehicle, snowmobile, river-outfitter licensing, and trails programs.

== Colorado State Parks ==
Park name	County or counties	Size		Year established	Remarks	Image
Park name	County or counties	acre	ha	Year established	Remarks	Image
Arkansas Headwaters Recreation Area	Chaffee, Fremont, Lake, Pueblo	6,193	2,506	1998		
Barr Lake State Park	Adams	2,715	1,099	1977		
Boyd Lake State Park	Larimer	334	135	1965		
Castlewood Canyon State Park	Douglas	2,621	1,061	1964		
Chatfield State Park	Douglas, Jefferson	3,895	1,576	1975		
Cherry Creek State Park	Arapahoe	3,346	1,354	1959		
Cheyenne Mountain State Park	El Paso	1,680	680	2006		
Crawford State Park	Delta, Montrose	734	297	1964		
Eldorado Canyon State Park	Boulder	885	358	1978		
Eleven Mile State Park	Park	7,662	3,101	1970		
Elkhead Reservoir State Park	Moffat, Routt	2,200	890	2006		
Fishers Peak State Park	Las Animas	19,200	7,800	2020	The park opened on October 30, 2020.	
Golden Gate Canyon State Park	Jefferson, Gilpin	12,119	4,904	1960		
Harvey Gap State Park	Garfield	320	130	1987		
Highline Lake State Park	Mesa	563	228	1967		
Jackson Lake State Park	Morgan	3,305	1,337	1965		
James M. Robb - Colorado River State Park	Mesa	890	360	1994		
John Martin Reservoir State Park	Bent	13,176	5,332	2001		
Lake Pueblo State Park	Pueblo	10,279	4,160	1975		
Lathrop State Park	Huerfano	1,596	646	1962		
Lone Mesa State Park	Dolores	11,702	4,736	N/A	Under development.	
Lory State Park	Larimer	2,492	1,008	1975		
Mancos State Park	Montezuma	553	224	1987		
Mueller State Park	Teller	5,112	2,069	1988		
Navajo State Park	Archuleta, La Plata	5,087	2,059	1964		
North Sterling State Park	Logan	5,700	2,300	1992		
Paonia State Park	Gunnison	1,857	752	1964		
Pearl Lake State Park	Routt	300	120	1964		
Ridgway State Park	Ouray	3,201	1,295	1989		
Rifle Falls State Park	Garfield	48	19	1966		
Rifle Gap State Park	Garfield	1,341	543	1966		
Roxborough State Park	Douglas	3,317	1,342	1975		
Spinney Mountain State Park	Park	6,080	2,460	1987		
St. Vrain State Park	Weld	688	278	1965		
Stagecoach State Park	Routt	1,641	664	1965		
State Forest State Park	Jackson, Larimer	70,838	28,667	1970		
Staunton State Park	Park, Jefferson	3,652	1,478	2013		
Steamboat Lake State Park	Routt	2,820	1,140	1967		
Sweetwater Lake State Park	Garfield	500	200	2021	Under development. The establishment of the park was announced on October 20, 2021.	
Sweitzer Lake State Park	Delta	210	85	1972		
Sylvan Lake State Park	Eagle	1,548	626	1987		
Trinidad Lake State Park	Las Animas	2,860	1,160	1980		
Vega State Park	Mesa	1,823	738	1967		
Yampa River State Park	Routt, Moffat	3,112	1,259	1998		

== See also ==
- Colorado Department of Natural Resources
  - Colorado Parks and Wildlife
- Bibliography of Colorado
- Geography of Colorado
- History of Colorado
- Index of Colorado-related articles
- List of Colorado-related lists
- Outline of Colorado
