= Rifle Falls Fish Hatchery =

- Some of the hatchery's raceways (2026)

- Location within Colorado Location within the United States

General information
- Location: 11466 State Highway 325, Rifle, Colorado
- Coordinates: 39°41′41.94″N 107°42′1.56″W
- Inaugurated: 1955

The Rifle Falls Fish Hatchery is a Colorado Parks and Wildlife cold water fish production facility located off East Rifle Creek near Rifle Falls State Park in Garfield County.

== History ==
Rifle Falls Fish Hatchery was inaugurated in 1955. It is the largest state-owned and operated trout production hatchery in Colorado. Water was irrigated directly from Rifle Creek and used 24 nursing ponds and 25 raceways. Currently, only 12 of 24 nursing ponds are used as to prevent spread of disease to Rifle Creek waters.

== Mission ==
An overarching mission among the hatchery staff is species restoration of the cutthroat trout to Colorado's western waters. Colorado Parks and Wildlife biologists inform the hatchery director of where and when to stock the trout as to ensure restoration. They discover locations that require stocking from the Creel Census.

== Fish species ==
Hatchery staff works to produce fingerlings and catchables of rainbow trout, Snake River cutthroat trout, brook trout, brown trout, and cutthroat trout. They stock these species in stream sections, lakes, and reservoirs in western Colorado and provide catchable trout for stocking along the Front Range. Cutthroat trout are also raised for aerial stocking. The hatchery's source of water is a groundwater spring. The use of spring water maintains a constant temperature of 59 °F (15 °C). Trout are raised in 40 raceways and transported by tanker truck to their stocking destinations. They are released through a valve in the base of the tank. Stocking may be done manually in limited access areas. Stocking tends to occur between February and November.
