= List of Colorado state forests =

Coordinates: 40.68°N 106.00°W

Location of the Colorado State Forest in the U.S. State of Colorado.

The U.S. state of Colorado has only one state forest, the Colorado State Forest in Jackson County. The Colorado State Forest is managed by the Colorado State Forest Service and is coextensive with the State Forest State Park which is managed by Colorado Parks and Wildlife.

== Colorado state forests ==
Name	County	Extent	Created	Notes
Colorado State Forest	Jackson	70,838 acres 28,667 ha	December 2, 1938	Coextensive with State Forest State Park.

== Gallery ==
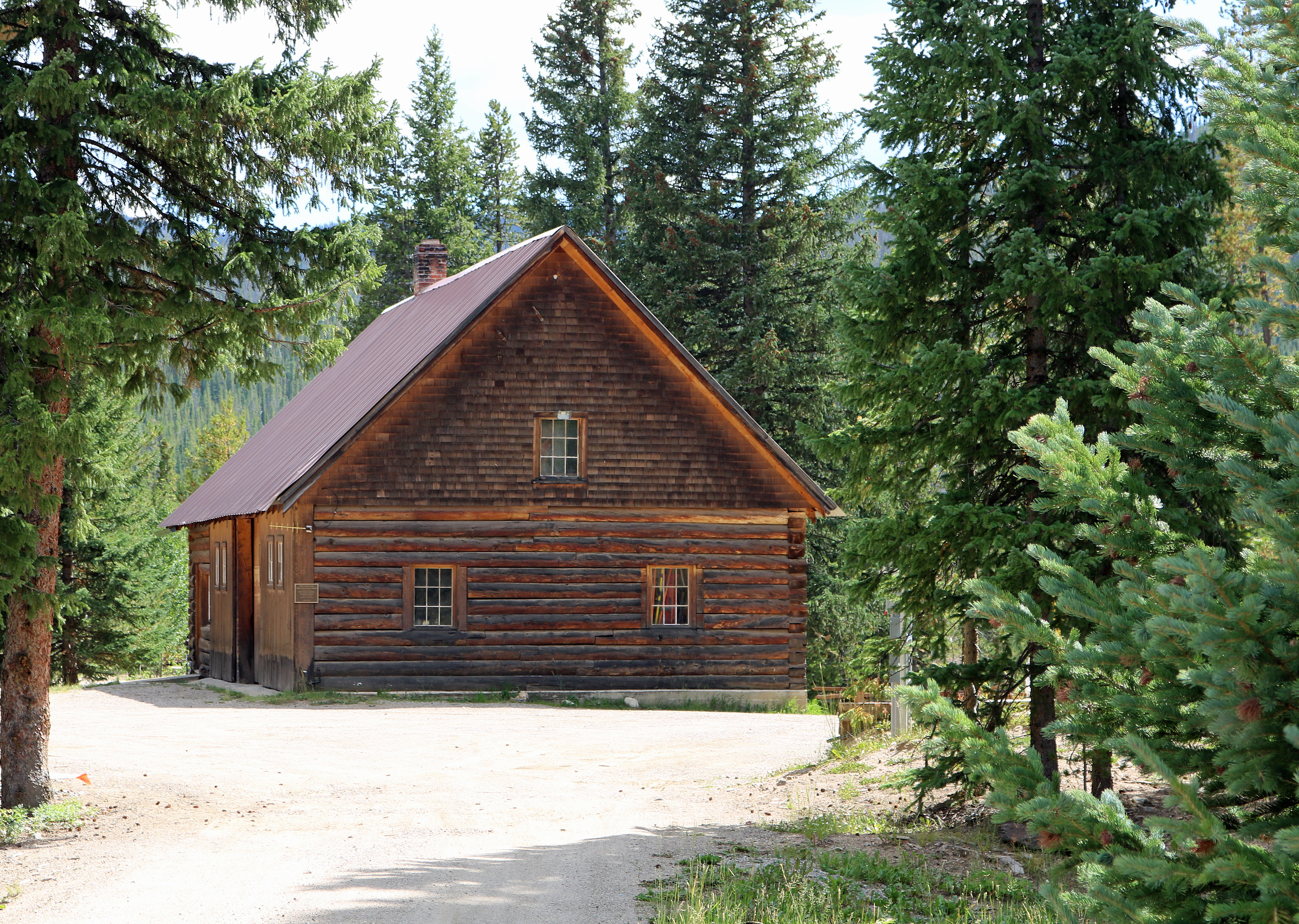
Log office building in Colorado State Forest.

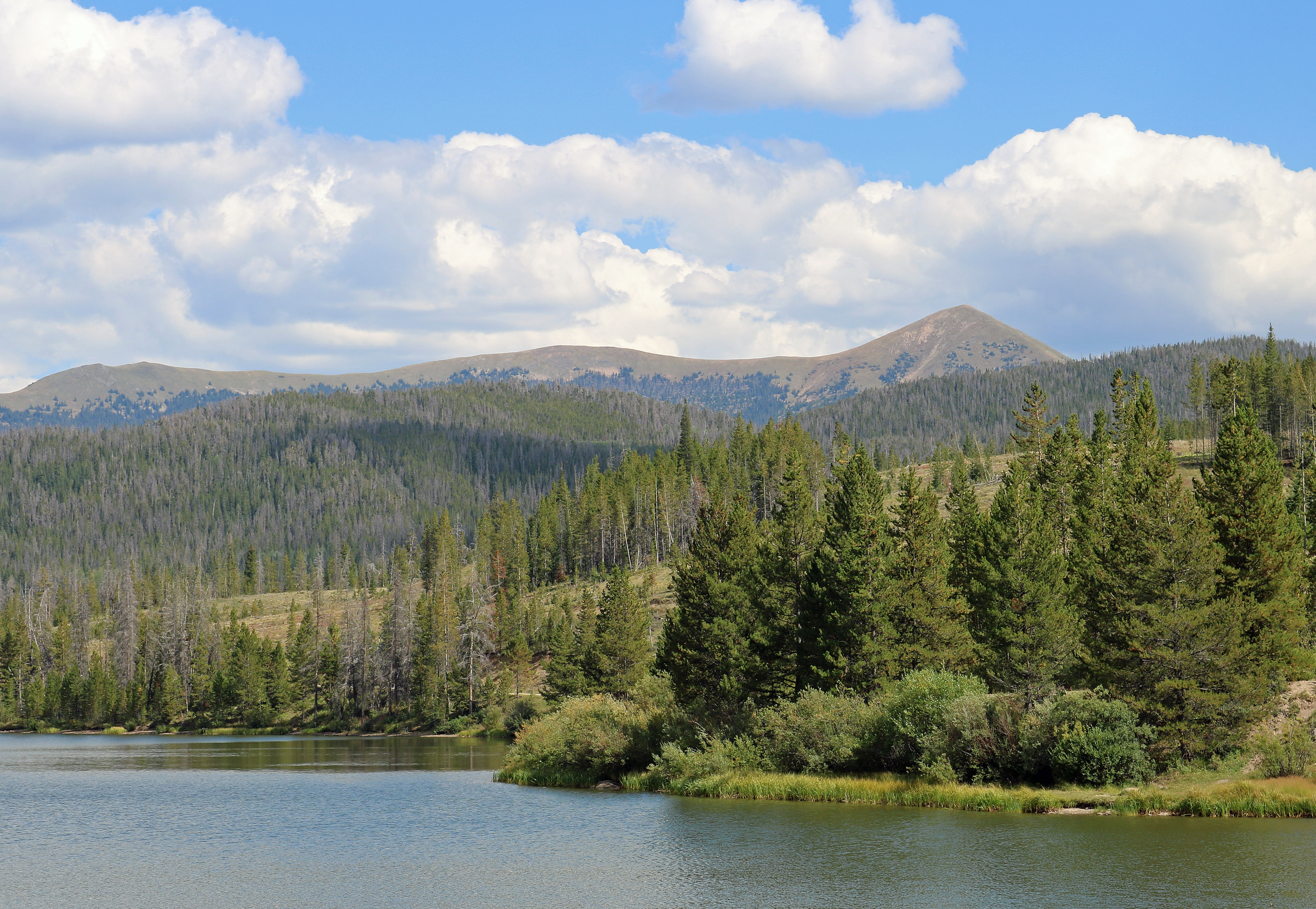
North Diamond Peak in Colorado State Forest.

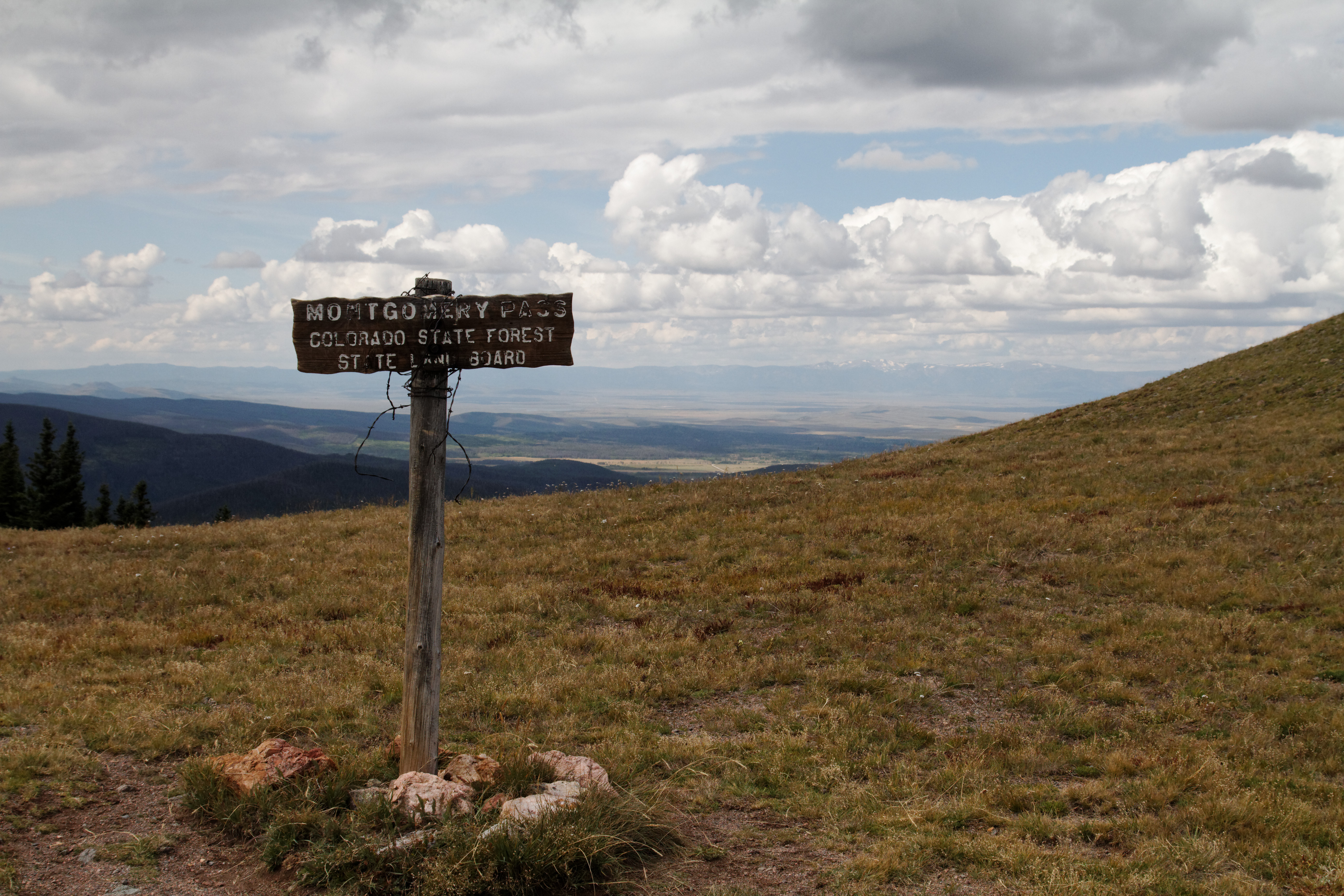
Montgomery Pass in Colorado State Forest.

== See also ==
- List of Colorado state parks
- List of national forests in Colorado
- Bibliography of Colorado
- Geography of Colorado
- History of Colorado
- Index of Colorado-related articles
- List of Colorado-related lists
- Outline of Colorado
