= El Campo =

El Campo may refer to:

- El Campo, California
- El Campo, Texas
- El Campo, Palencia
