= Sleeping Indian =

Sleeping Indian may refer to:

- Nokhu Crags, a mountain peak in Colorado
- Sleeping Indian, the southern end of Sheep Mountain (Teton County, Wyoming)
