= Static Peak (Colorado) =

Mountain in Colorado, United States

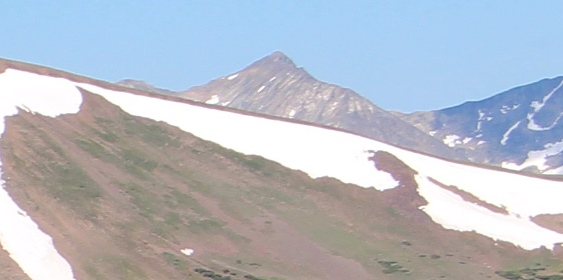
- Static Peak viewed from Rocky Mountain National Park

Highest point
- Elevation: 12,580 ft (3,834 m)
- Coordinates: 40°28′36″N 105°53′30″W

Geography
- Location within Colorado
- Location: Continental Divide between Rocky Mountain National Park in Grand County and Jackson County, Colorado, United States
- Parent range: Never Summer Mountains
- Topo map(s): USGS 7.5' topographic map Mount Richthofen, Colorado

Geology
- Mountain type: Andesite

Climbing
- Easiest route: Mount Richthofen Saddle

Static Peak is a mountain peak in the U.S. state of Colorado, within State Forest State Park and part of the Never Summer Mountain Range. It is located in a chain of peaks and lies between Nokhu Crags to the north and Mount Richthofen to the south. To the east lie the shallow basins of Snow Lake and to the west the mountain descends directly into the deep waters of Lake Agnes.

== Geology ==
Approximately 24–29 million years ago, rising magma began to create volcanoes that were the predecessors of the Never Summer Mountains. The magma cooled into granitic formations that have weathered into the current mountain range.

== See also ==
- List of Colorado mountain ranges
- List of Colorado mountain summits
  - List of Colorado fourteeners
  - List of Colorado 4000 meter prominent summits
  - List of the most prominent summits of Colorado
- List of Colorado county high points
