= Lake Agnes (Colorado) =

Lake in Jackson County, Colorado

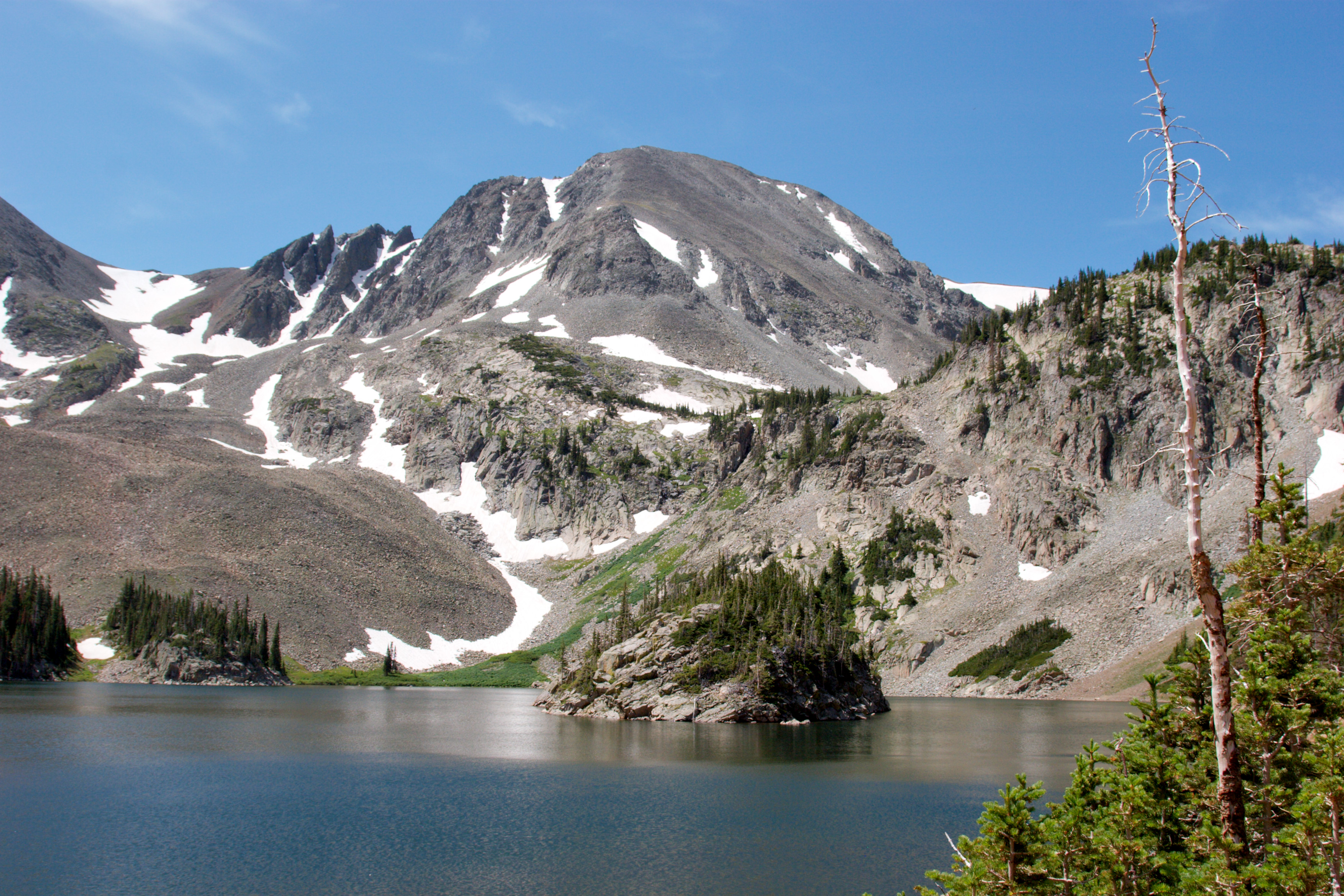
- Lake Agnes and Mount Mahler

- Location within Colorado Location within the United States
- Location: State Forest State Park, Jackson County, Colorado, Colorado, United States
- Coordinates: 40°28′54″N 105°54′11″W
- Primary outflows: Michigan River
- Basin countries: United States
- Surface elevation: 10,666 ft (3,251 m)
- Islands: 1

Lake Agnes is an alpine lake in the Colorado State Forest State Park occurring within the Never Summer Mountain Range. The lake lies within glacial tarn surrounded by a cirque consisting of Nokhu Crags, Static Peak, Mount Richthofen, Mount Mahler, and Braddock Peak. It is the deepest lake in the Colorado State Forest State Park. Lake Agnes is named after Agnes Zimmerman, the daughter of John Zimmerman, a homesteader in the area and the proprietor of the Keystone Hotel in Home, Colorado.
