= Rifle Gap Dam =

Dam in Garfield County, Colorado

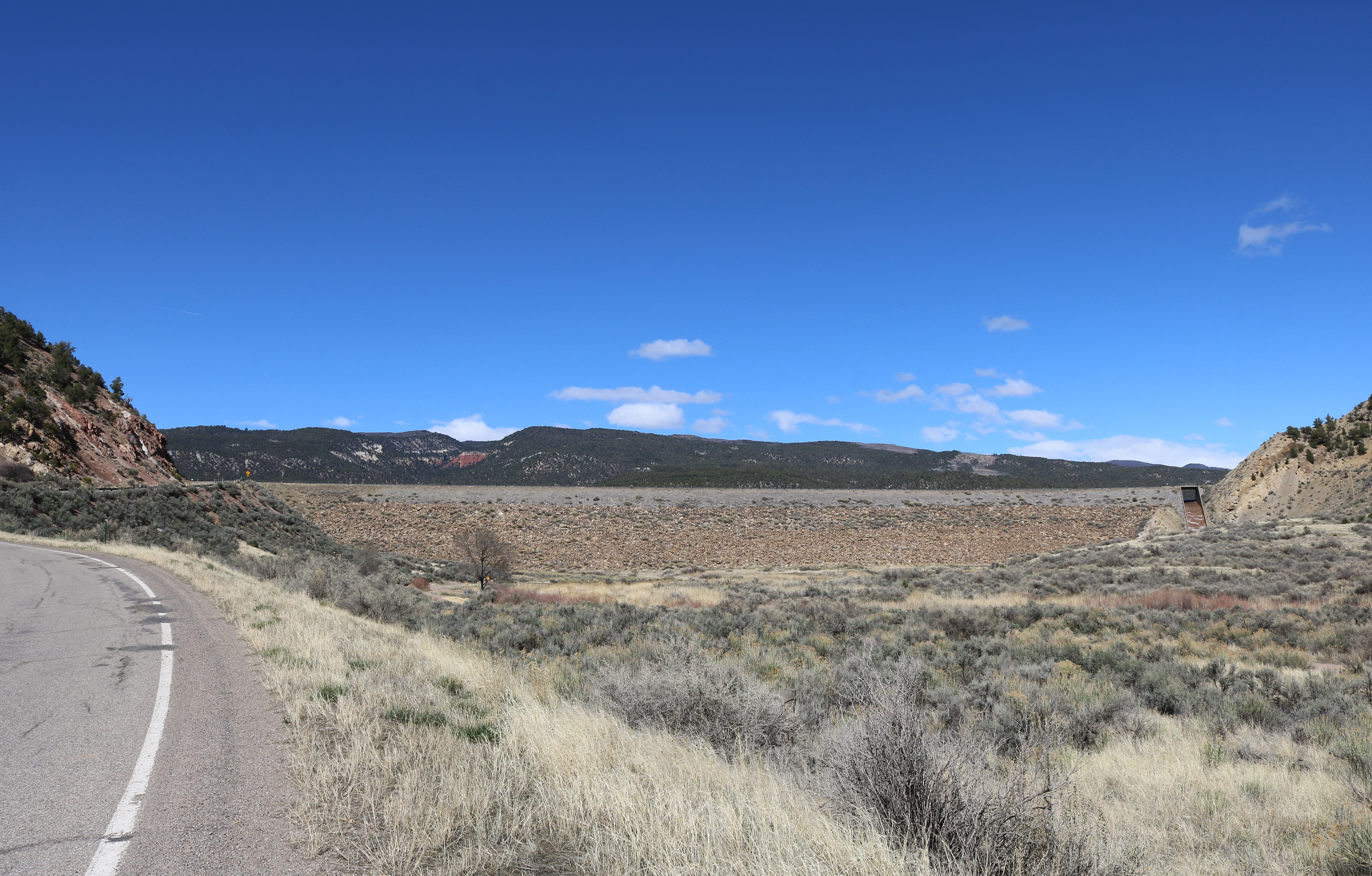
- Interactive map of Rifle Gap Dam
- Country: United States
- Location: Garfield County, Colorado
- Coordinates: 39°37′41″N 107°45′34″W
- Status: Operational
- Construction began: 1964
- Opening date: 1967
- Built by: United States Bureau of Reclamation
- Designed by: United States Bureau of Reclamation
- Operator: Silt Water Conservancy District

Dam and spillways
- Height: 157 ft (48 m)
- Length: 1,450 ft (440 m)

Reservoir
- Creates: Rifle Gap Reservoir
- Total capacity: 12,168 acre⋅ft (15,009,000 m^{3})
- Surface area: 359 acres (145 ha)
- Normal elevation: 1,818 m (5,965 ft)

Rifle Gap Dam (National ID # CO01692) is a dam in Garfield County, Colorado, about five and a half miles north of Rifle.

The earthen dam was constructed between 1964 and 1967 by the United States Bureau of Reclamation, with a height of 157 feet (48 m) and a length of 1,450 feet (440 m) feet at its crest. It impounds East Rifle Creek and West Rifle Creek about 400 feet (120 m) feet upstream from their previous point of confluence. The dam was built for irrigation water storage, is owned by the Bureau, and is operated by the local Silt Water Conservancy District.

The reservoir it creates, Rifle Gap Reservoir, has a water surface of 359 acres (145 hectares) and a maximum capacity of 12,168 acre-feet (15,009,000 cubic metres). Recreation includes scuba diving in its clear water, fishing (for rainbow and German brown trout, walleye, perch, and smallmouth and largemouth bass, etc.), wildlife watching, boating, year-round camping, and hiking.

== See also ==
- Rifle Gap State Park
- Rifle Creek
