= Fishers Peak State Park =

State park In Colorado, United States

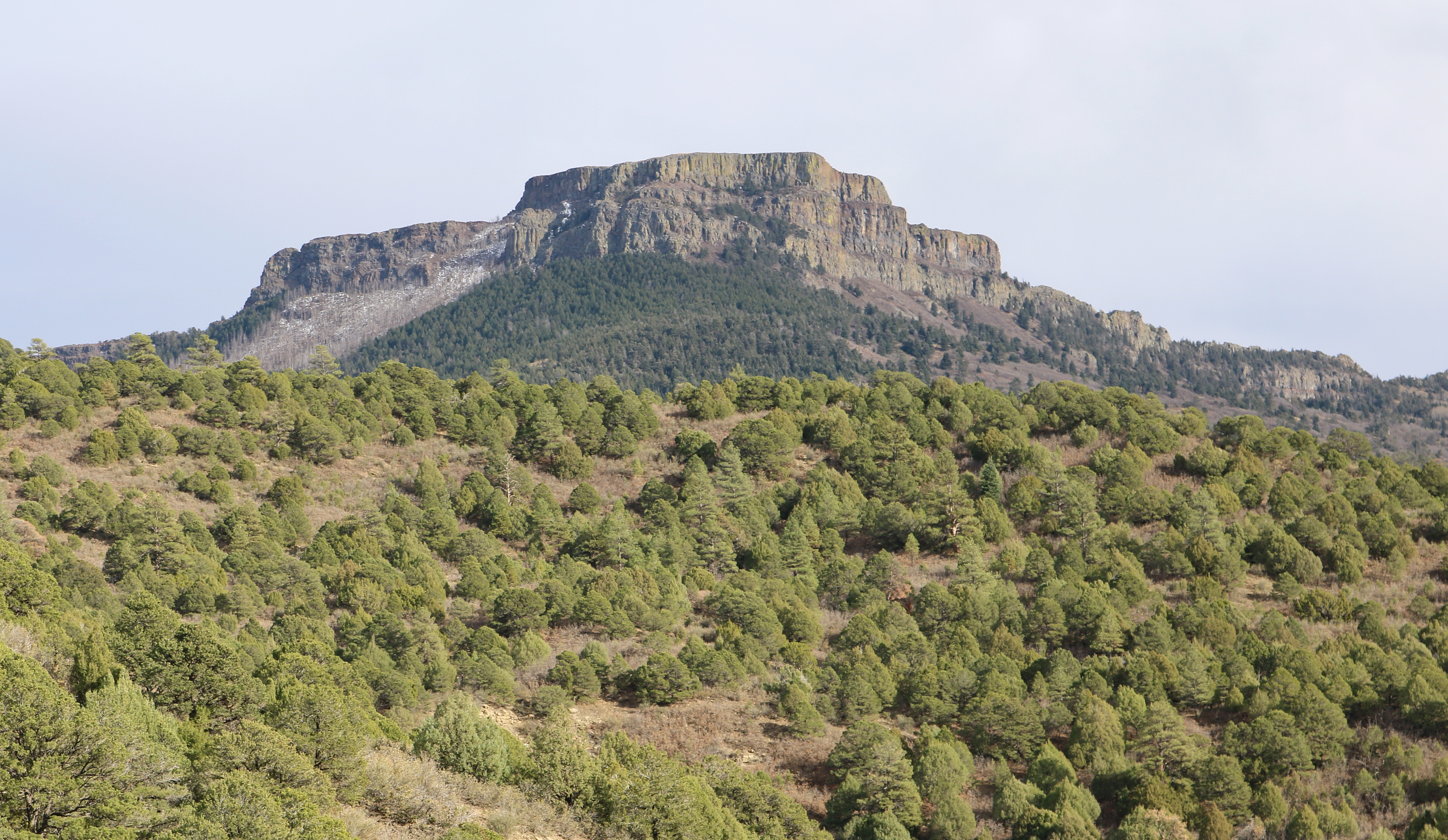
- Fishers Peak in Fishers Peak State Park

- Location within Colorado Location within the United States
- Location: Las Animas County, Colorado, USA
- Nearest city: Trinidad, Colorado
- Coordinates: 37°03′35″N 104°29′14″W
- Area: 19,200 acres (7,800 ha)
- Established: 2020
- Visitors: 224 (in 2021)
- Governing body: Colorado Parks and Wildlife

Fishers Peak State Park is a Colorado state park in Las Animas County, Colorado, just south of Trinidad, Colorado. Trinidad Lake State Park is nearby. The park opened on October 30, 2020, and remains under development.

== History ==
The land for the park, formerly the privately held Crazy French Ranch, was purchased in 2019. Funds for the acquisition came jointly from Great Outdoors Colorado, the funding arm of the Colorado Lottery, The Nature Conservancy, and The Trust for Public Land.

== Geography and wildlife ==
The park takes its name from Fishers Peak, elevation 9,632 feet (2,936 m), a prominent flat-topped mountain and the highest point on Raton Mesa. The mesa was designated a National Natural Landmark in 1967. The park lies within the Raton Basin.

The park includes grasslands, foothills, and mountains. Wildlife documented at the park includes elk, mule deer, black bears, mountain lions, bobcats, and raptors.

=== Peregrine Falcon protections ===
Colorado Parks and Wildlife (CPW) enforces a seasonal protection measure for peregrine falcon nests at Fishers Peak. From March 15 through July 31, all visitors must remain outside a posted one-half-mile buffer around Peregrine Falcon nests. CPW also closes the Stone Guard, Peak Approach, and Summit Loop trails during that period, preventing public access to the summit while the falcons nest.

In November 2023, Governor Jared Polis opened the summit trail for the season and noted that its upper section would close on March 15 to protect the cliffside area where falcons nest and breed. In August 2026, CPW reopened the final mile of the summit trail after its resource-stewardship biologists determined that the year’s young falcons had fledged and become independent. CPW described the result as the nesting pair’s fifth consecutive year of occupancy and breeding success at the park.

=== Comparison raised in Sweetwater Lake debate ===
Fishers Peak’s enforceable half-mile Peregrine Falcon buffer became a point of comparison in public controversy concerning the proposed Sweetwater Lake State Park in Garfield County. The United States Forest Service’s 2026 Draft Environmental Impact Statement (DEIS) for Sweetwater Lake states that the proposed action would not be consistent with Wildlife General Standard 9 because human activity would not be restricted within one-half mile of occupied Peregrine Falcon nesting areas from March 15 through July 31.

The DEIS instead describes an Environmentally Sensitive Zone of approximately one-quarter mile around the nesting area and a 400-yard seasonal watercraft buffer, while its construction mitigation measure prohibits the initiation of disturbance within one-half mile of the known eyrie during the March 15–July 31 breeding period. The DEIS also states that the forest-plan standard’s half-mile protection may be reduced according to local topography, disturbance potential, and habitat components.

The Colorado Sun reported that Sweetwater-area residents cited Fishers Peak’s half-mile seasonal visitor buffers in questioning why the Sweetwater Lake State Park DEIS did not apply CPW's own restrictions to Peregrine Falcon and Bald Eagle nesting areas.

== Contiguous conservation areas ==
Adjoining Fishers Peak State Park on the east are two Colorado State Wildlife Areas: Lake Dorothey, 5,152 acres (2,085 ha), and James M. John, 8,339 acres (3,375 ha). Lake Dorothey also adjoins Sugarite Canyon State Park, 3,600 acres (1,500 ha), in New Mexico. The contiguous acreage in public ownership is approximately 36,000 acres (15,000 ha).

== See also ==
- List of Colorado state parks
- Sweetwater Lake State Park
