= Indian Springs Trace Fossil Natural Area =

Fossil site in Fremont County, Colorado

Coordinates: 38°29′35.27″N 105°7′56.94″W

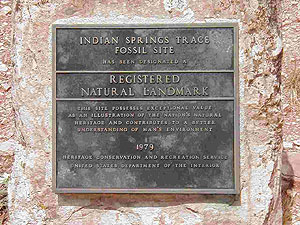
- Interactive map of Indian Springs Trace Fossil Natural Area
- Location: Fremont County, Colorado, USA

U.S. National Natural Landmark
- Designated: 1980

Indian Springs Trace Fossil Natural Area is a 40-acre (Note: The National Park Service reported that the site is 113 acres.) privately owned site on the Indian Springs Ranch in Fremont County, Colorado. It was designated a National Natural Landmark in 1980.

== Overview ==
There are 25 types of trace fossils of horseshoe crab, brachiopods, trilobites and pawless armor-plated fish that lived 450 million years ago in a lagoon. The fossils are set in rock of Harding Formation. It is considered North America's best site of trace fossils because it shows the movement of the ancient animals. Tracks left by the animals walking, swimming and burrowing in what had been a tidal lagoon's mudflat.

The site is located along the Gold Belt Byway on the grounds of the Indians Springs Campground. Owners conduct tours of the fossil site.

== Fossil sites ==
The National Park Service has several sites across the country that protect fossils, which includes trace, plant, vertebrate and invertebrate fossils. The sites are protected for their educational and scientific value. Other sites in Colorado include the Dinosaur National Monument and Florissant Fossil Beds National Monument.

== Colorado Natural Area ==
It is a designated area under the Colorado Natural Areas Program because there are 25 different types of trace fossils from crabs to fish and trilobites from the Ordovician Period. There are 93 designated sites that in total protect more than 250 endangered, rare, or threatened species.
