= Nokhu Crags =

Mountain in the American state of Colorado

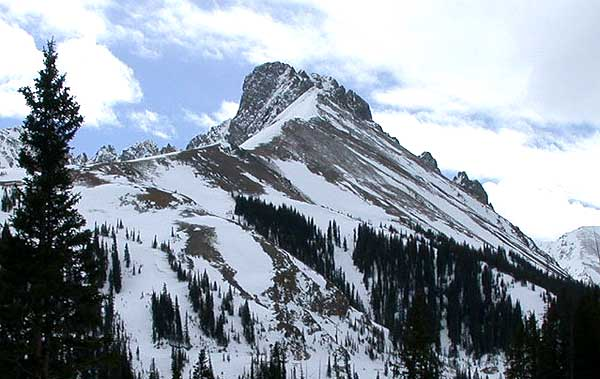
- Nokhu Crags, seen from State Highway 14 on the west side of Cameron Pass

Highest point
- Elevation: 12,490 ft (3,807 m)
- Prominence: 345 ft (105 m)
- Coordinates: 40°29′05″N 105°53′37″W

Geography
- Location within Colorado
- Location: Jackson County, Colorado, U.S.
- Parent range: Never Summer Mountains
- Topo map(s): USGS 7.5' topographic map Mount Richthofen, Colorado

Geology
- Mountain type: Hornfels

Nokhu Crags is a rock formation and mountain summit in the Never Summer Mountains range of the Rocky Mountains of North America. The name is derived from the Arapaho language, Neaha-no-xhu, meaning "Eagles Nest." The 12,490-foot (3,807 m) peak is located in State Forest State Park, 2.5 miles (4.0 km) south (bearing 181°) of Cameron Pass in Jackson County, Colorado, United States. The summit lies just northwest of the Continental Divide and Rocky Mountain National Park, near the headwaters of the Michigan River. The peak is prominently visible from State Highway 14 and can be seen throughout the southern North Park basin where it is also known as "Sawtooth Mountain", "the Crags" or "Sleeping Indian" for its resemblance to the form of a supine chief. To the east lie the shallow basins of Snow Lake and the Michigan or American Lakes; to the north lies a snow filled couloir; to the west the mountain descends directly into the deep waters of Lake Agnes; and to the south lie Static Peak, Mount Richthofen, and the remainder of the Never Summer Mountain Range.

== Geology ==
The rocks of the peak were formed as a sedimentary deposit millions of years ago in an ancient ocean basin. The entire region was subsequently thrust up with the formation of the Medicine Bow Range at the close of the Mesozoic Era. Around 24–29 million years ago, rising magma began to create volcanoes that were the predecessors of the Never Summer Mountains. The magma cooled into granitic formations and nearby, now vertical, shale metamorphosed into the hornfels that forms the present day Nokhu Crags. After millions of years of erosion and glaciation, the vertical fin-like form of the Nohku Crags was exposed. Erosion continues to reshape the Crags, as evidenced by the extensive talus field at its base.

Today the mountain is a barren, almost treeless form, virtually devoid of vegetation. During the day, pika and mountain goats may be seen and heard on the steep slopes. In the afternoon light green and orange hues of lichen covering the face of the rocks becomes apparent. In the evening thousands of bats stream from nooks and crannies of the western face. In the winter the Nokhu Crags are covered with deep snow and the flanks are the scene of frequent avalanches. An avalanche in 2013 killed a skier and buried another skier for hours.

== Historical names ==
- Nokhu Crags
- Sawtooth Crags
- Sawtooth Mountain
- Sleeping Indian

== See also ==
- List of Colorado mountain ranges
- List of Colorado mountain summits
  - List of Colorado fourteeners
  - List of Colorado 4000 meter prominent summits
  - List of the most prominent summits of Colorado
- List of Colorado county high points
