= Roan Plateau =

Landform in Colorado, U.S.

- Plateau
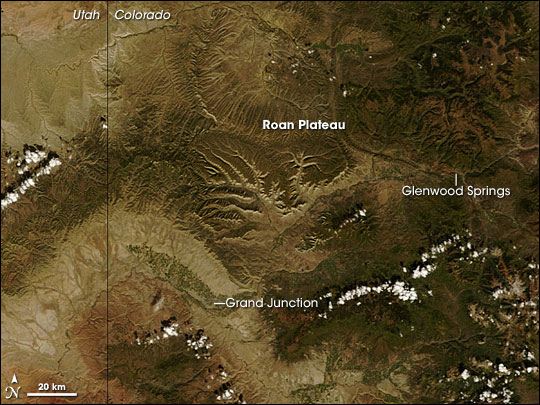
- Roan Plateau, Colorado, NASA satellite image. On September 25, 2008, the Moderate Resolution Imaging Spectroradiometer (MODIS) on NASA’s Terra satellite captured this image of the region through nearly cloud-free skies.
- Interactive map of Roan Plateau
- Coordinates: 39°35′06″N 107°57′29″W
- Location: Garfield County, Colorado, USA

The Roan Plateau is a plateau in western Colorado, U.S., in Garfield County. It contains a variety of natural resources and scenic terrain: high ridges, deep valleys, desert lands, waterfalls, cutthroat trout, mountain lions, bears, rare plants, and oil and natural gas.

In the natural-color image at right the Roan Plateau assumes shades of green, brown, and beige, and deep canyons form branching, tree-like patterns on the landscape, and desert lands in the portions west of Meeker, Craig, and Rifle.

Irrigation enables crops to thrive in this largely arid environment, evidenced by the relative greenness of the orchards and lawns around Grand Junction, Colorado. West of Rifle, the high desert terrain begins. Small towns of Battlement Mesa, Parachute, and De Beque are all high desert terrain. The land of Grand Junction and all around the city is pale beige, and has high desert terrain. This desert landscape extends west and southwest into Utah, and north across the Roan Plateau, and into Wyoming. The desert land also extends southeast through Whitewater, Delta, Olathe, and Montrose, and then the desert lands end as you pass the Montrose area. East of Grand Junction, however, Grand Mesa (partially obscured by clouds) is well-forested with conifers.

== Natural gas ==
The plateau's energy reserves invite exploration and drilling: existing wells produce natural gas immediately adjacent to the plateau. In 2000 the U.S. Bureau of Land Management began developing the Roan Plateau Resource Management Plan. Released in final form in early 2008, the plan allowed for recovery of natural gas from beneath the plateau while setting aside 21,034 acres (85 square kilometers) as an Area of Critical Environmental Concern.

In accordance with the Management Plan, the BLM leased 54,631 acres (221.08 km^{2}) for gas development on the Roan Plateau in August 2008. The winning competitive bids totaled $113.9 million in lease bonuses, a record for a federal onshore lease sale in the lower 48 states. The Colorado state government will receive 49% of the lease bonuses, as well as 49% of subsequent royalties (royalties are 12.5% of the gross value) from gas sales. The lease sale received much criticism from those opposed to development on the plateau, including from Colorado Governor Bill Ritter.

== See also ==
- Piceance Basin
