= Rifle Creek =

Stream in Colorado, USA

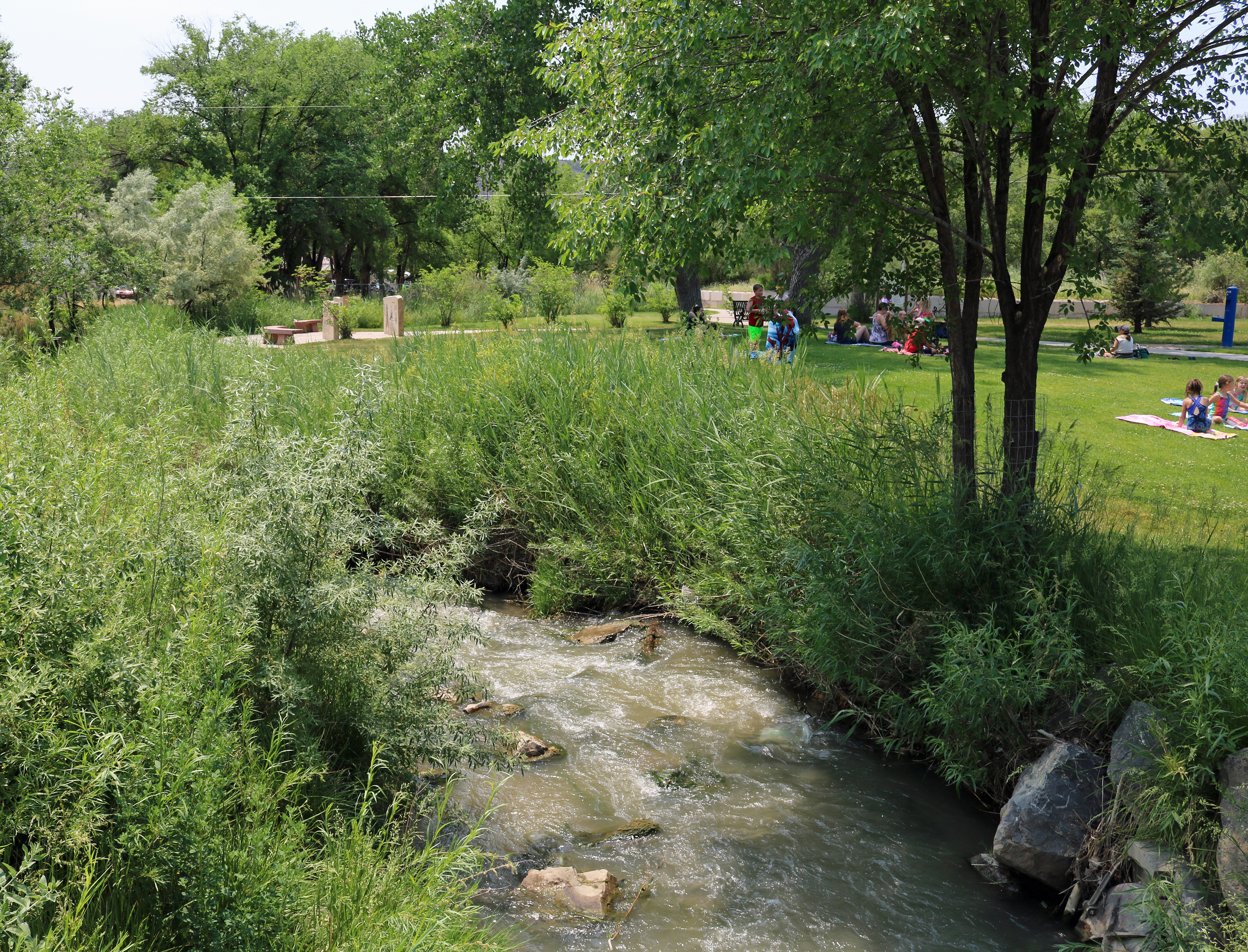
Rifle Creek in Centennial Park in Rifle, Colorado

Rifle Creek is a stream in Garfield County in the U.S. state of Colorado. It is a tributary of the Colorado River.

Rifle Creek starts at the confluence of West Rifle Creek and East Rifle Creek, and the junction is within the waters of the Rifle Gap Reservoir. The stream flows south and enters the Colorado after passing through the city of Rifle.

The creek's source is at 39°37′34″N 107°45′37″W, and it flows into the Colorado at 39°31′39″N 107°47′24″W.

Rifle Creek was named from an incident in which a rifle was found along its banks.

== See also ==
- List of rivers of Colorado
