= Narraguinnep Natural Area =

Protected area in Colorado, US

- IUCN category Ia (strict nature reserve)
- Location within Colorado Location within the United States
- Location: Dolores County, Colorado
- Nearest city: Cortez, Colorado
- Coordinates: 37°41′24″N 108°39′49″W
- Area: 2,922 acres (11.82 km^{2})
- Established: 1962
- Governing body: United States Forest Service

Narraguinnep Natural Area is a 2,922 acre natural area in Dolores County, Colorado that is owned by the United States Forest Service. It was designated a natural area in 1980. The Colorado Natural Area includes Narraguinnep Canyon, which is located within Dolores Ranger District of the San Juan National Forest and extends southwest into Montezuma County, Colorado. It is near the Canyons of the Ancients National Monument.

Oakbrush, juniper, and pinon and ponderosa pine trees grow in the natural area. In 2009, a wildfire burned most of the natural area. Since then, Gambel oak thickets have returned in the main area. The old-growth pine, located in the northwest corner of the natural area, was not damaged during the fire.

The Domínguez–Escalante expedition (1776) passed through the Dolores area and then east of present-day Cahone and Dove Creek during their expedition. While in the area, they took a siesta in an arroyo, which may have been in Narraguinnep Canyon.

== See also ==
- Fort Narraguinnep - a defensive site constructed after the Beaver Creek Massacre (June 19, 1885)
