= Yampa River State Park =

State park in Colorado, United States

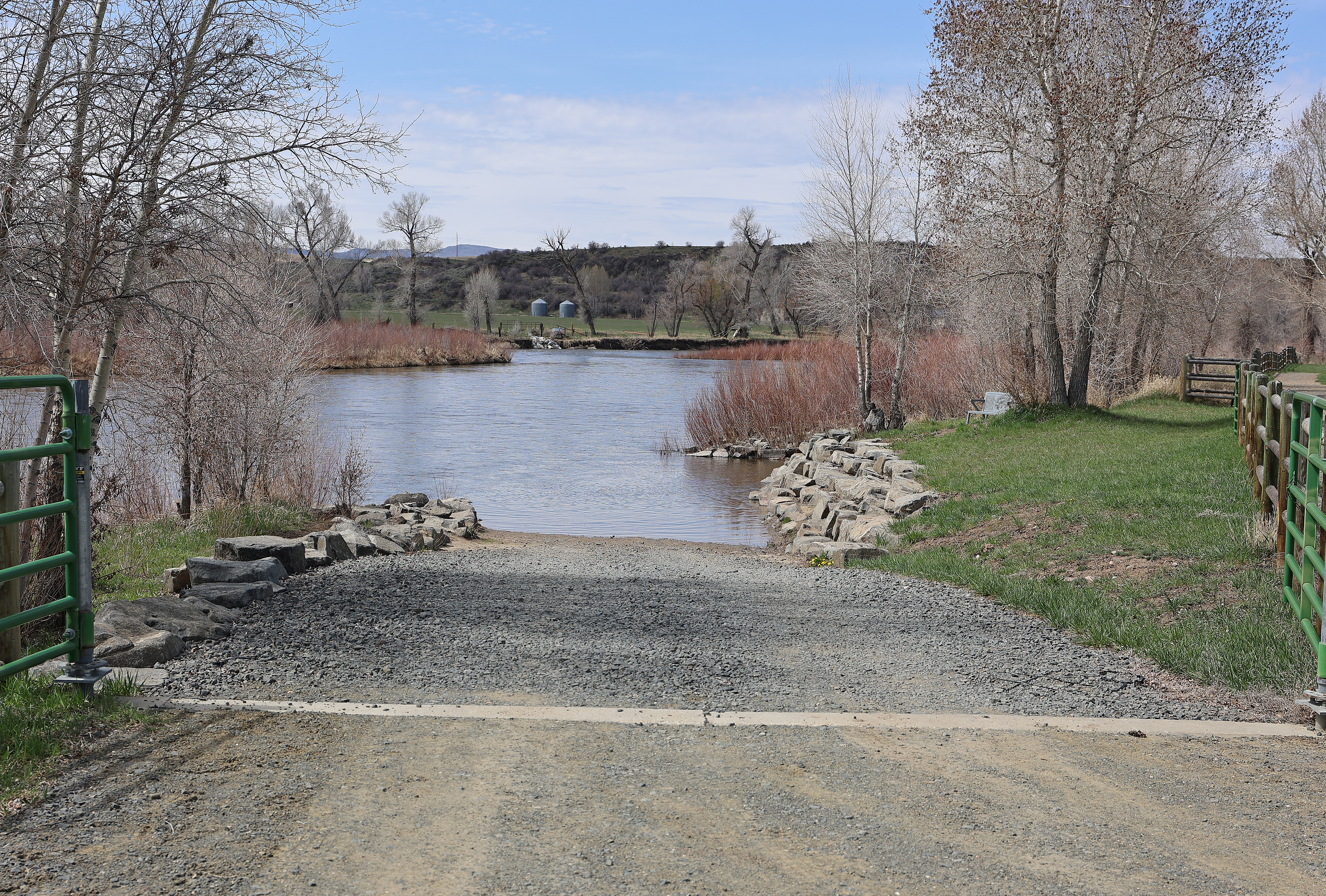
- A boat ramp on the Yampa River at the park

- Location within Colorado
- Location: Routt & Moffat Counties, Colorado, US
- Nearest city: Craig, Colorado
- Coordinates: 40°29′27″N 107°18′46″W
- Area: 3,112 acres (1,259 ha)
- Established: 1998
- Visitors: 177,816 (in 2021)
- Governing body: Colorado Parks & Wildlife

Yampa River State Park is a Colorado state park located along the Yampa River in Routt and Moffat Counties in northwestern Colorado in the United States.

== Features ==
Yampa River State Park provides 13 access points for boaters along 134 miles (216 km) of the Yampa River from Hayden to the eastern boundary of Dinosaur National Monument. Walkways and hiking trails explore the river's canyons and riparian zones, surrounding rock formations, and natural habitats. A visitor center with a nature trail is located 17 miles (27 km) east of Craig.

=== Campgrounds ===
A main campground is adjacent to the visitors center. This campground has 50 campsites including 35 RV electric sites, 10 tent sites, and five sites for group camping. The park also includes less developed campsites near many of the river access points
