= Elkhead Reservoir State Park =

State park in Moffat and Routt counties, Colorado

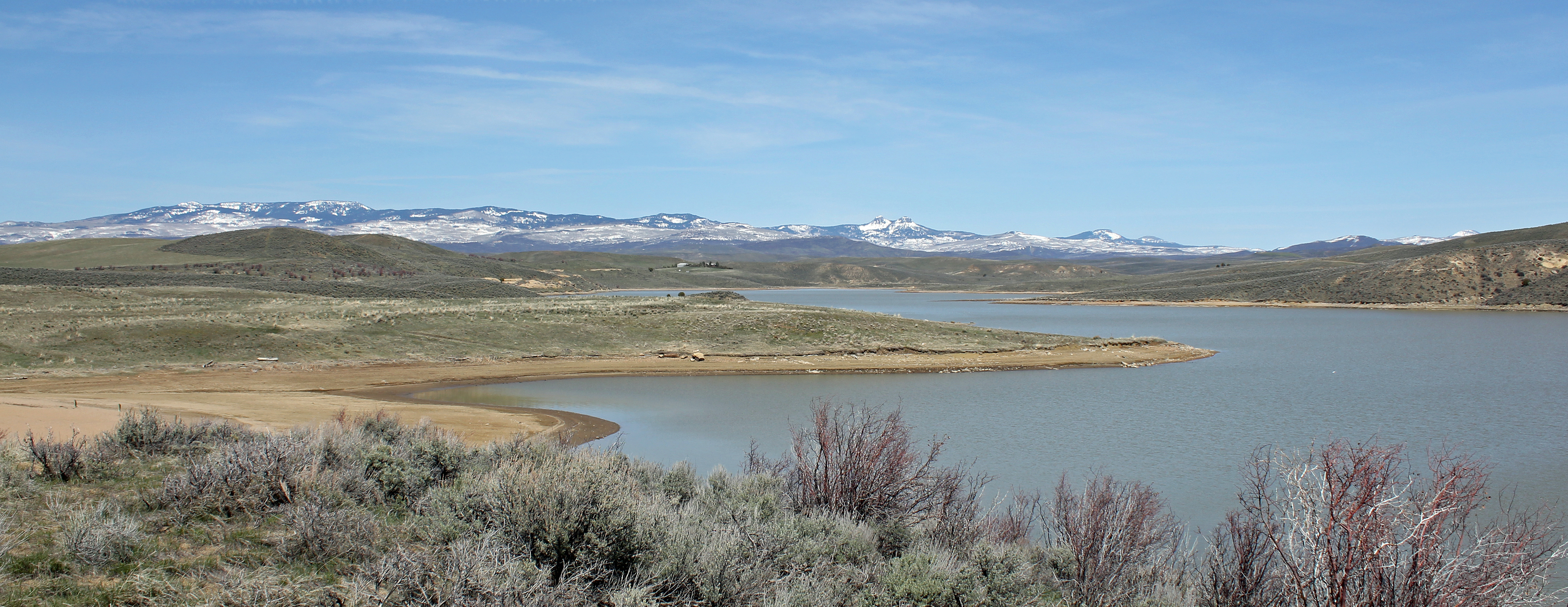
- A view of Elkhead State park including Elkhead Reservoir with the Elkhead Mountains in the distance.

- Location within Colorado
- Location: Moffat County and Routt County, Colorado, U.S.
- Nearest city: Craig, Colorado
- Coordinates: 40°33′40″N 107°22′54″W
- Area: 2,200 acres (8.9 km^{2})
- Created: 1998
- Operator: Colorado Parks and Wildlife
- Visitors: 268,047 (in 2021)

Elkhead Reservoir State Park is a Colorado state park located in Moffat and Routt counties in northwest Colorado, near Craig. The park surrounds and includes the 900 surface acre Elkhead Reservoir. It is referred to as Elkhead State Park. Elkhead Reservoir State Park is managed as a complex out of the Yampa River State Park office, located to the west of the town of Hayden, CO.

Elkhead Reservoir was constructed in 1974 and is owned by the City of Craig. The Colorado State Parks system took over management of recreational use and facilities at the reservoir in 1998.

The reservoir is stocked with primarily warmwater fish species, including largemouth bass, black crappie, and bluegill. Activities at the park include both non-electric and electric camping, fishing, boating, wildlife viewing, and hiking. As of 2021, Elkhead Reservoir State Park did not feature potable water as an amenity, though it can be sourced at the nearby Yampa River State Park.

== Geography ==
The park straddles the Routt / Moffat county line. The reservoir dams Elkhead Creek, which drains the Elkhead Mountains, to the north.

== See also ==
- Craig, Colorado
- Elkhead Mountains
- List of Colorado state parks
