= James M. Robb – Colorado River State Park =

State park in Mesa County, Colorado

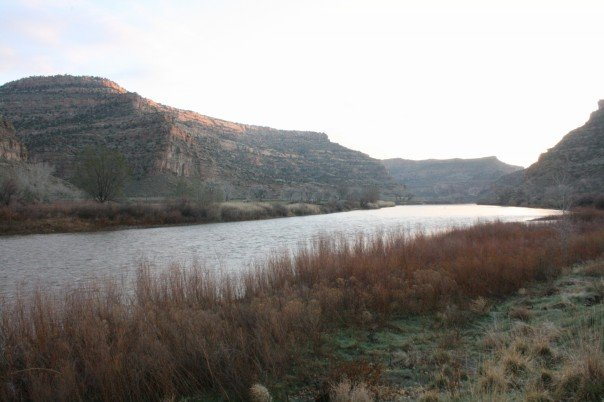
- James M. Robb-Colorado River State Park

- Location within Colorado
- Location: Mesa County, Colorado, U.S.
- Nearest city: Grand Junction
- Coordinates: 39°03′27″N 108°27′39″W
- Area: 890 acres (3.6 km^{2})
- Established: 1994
- Governing body: Colorado Parks and Wildlife

The James M. Robb – Colorado River State Park is a Colorado State Park along the Colorado River in Mesa County near Grand Junction, Colorado. The 890-acre (3.6 km^{2}) park established in 1994 has five distinct sections providing access to the river. The Island Acres segment has campsites and a swim beach. The Fruita segment also has campsites. The other three segments, Corn Lake, Connected Lakes and the Colorado River Wildlife Area are for day use only. Corn Lake, Connected Lakes and Fruita have boat ramps. The downriver float trip between Corn Lake and Connected Lakes is about 10 miles (16 km), as is the trip between Connected Lakes and Fruita. Both trips include some class II rapids.
