= Sweetwater Lake State Park =

Proposed state park in Colorado, United States

- Sweetwater Lake (2026)

- Location within Colorado
- Location: Garfield County, Colorado, United States
- Nearest town: Dotsero
- Coordinates: 39°48′N 107°10′W
- Area: 488 acres (197 ha)
- Elevation: 7,713 ft (2,351 m)
- Established: 2021
- Named for: Sweetwater Lake
- Governing body: United States Forest Service; proposed management by Colorado Parks and Wildlife

Sweetwater Lake State Park is the name announced in 2021 for a proposed state-managed recreation area centered on Sweetwater Lake in the White River National Forest in Garfield County, Colorado. The lake is about 12 miles (19 km) northwest of Dotsero, Colorado, near the Flat Tops Wilderness.

The United States Forest Service acquired the 488-acre (197 ha) property in 2021 after an interim acquisition by The Conservation Fund. Governor Jared Polis later announced a proposed partnership under which Colorado Parks and Wildlife (CPW) would manage the site. Colorado Public Radio described the proposal as a first-in-the-nation arrangement for a state park on Forest Service land. As of September 2026, the Forest Service was considering whether to issue CPW a 20-year special-use permit after completing an environmental-impact-statement process.

== History ==
Sweetwater Lake and the surrounding ranch had been privately owned for decades and had been considered for residential, hotel, and water-bottling development. The Conservation Fund acquired the property in 2020 while the Forest Service sought funding through the Land and Water Conservation Fund. The Forest Service completed its acquisition on August 31, 2021.

== Management and development proposal ==
The Forest Service began its environmental-review process in 2024. In June 2026, it released a draft environmental impact statement (DEIS) for an 846-acre (342 ha) project area, including about 433 acres (175 ha) acquired in 2021 and 413 acres (167 ha) of pre-existing National Forest System land.

The DEIS analyzes four alternatives:

- Alternative 1 would continue Forest Service management with limited operational maintenance.
- Alternative 2, the proposed action, would issue CPW a 20-year special-use permit and create eight recreation and management zones.
- Alternative 3 would provide fewer improvements and a more primitive recreation experience without a long-term CPW permit.
- Alternative 4 would provide more facilities and accommodate higher visitation under CPW management.

Alternative 2 could include a lodge with a store, watercraft rentals, food service, and outdoor deck; a 20-site campground; up to 12 year-round rustic cabins; employee housing; equestrian facilities; trails; and water-treatment infrastructure. The Forest Service estimated a development period of about ten years. Reporting on the DEIS stated that the alternative would target about 250 daily visitors, allow up to 479 daily visitors, and involve an estimated $45 million in development costs.

== Wildlife and raptor habitat ==
The Sweetwater Lake area includes wetlands, forest, and cliff habitat used by a range of wildlife. In 2024 scoping comments, Roaring Fork Audubon and the Roaring Fork Group of the Sierra Club reported that 2023 and 2024 surveys documented 84 bird species in the lake area, including species of conservation concern. The DEIS addresses habitat for nesting bald eagles and peregrine falcons, as well as elk, mule deer, bats, wetlands, and other resources.

Before release of the DEIS, the Forest Service issued a five-year restriction on entry into a designated raptor-protection area from February 1 through August 15. The restriction also prohibited climbing, motorized boating, and entry into the Ute Cave above the lake.

CPW's March 2024 Resource Stewardship Plan ranked seasonal closures to protect breeding raptors as a high priority, recommended following the agency's 2020 raptor-buffer guidelines, and proposed restricting access to portions of the lake and nearby trails from December 1 through July 31 or completion of nesting. The guidelines recommend no new surface occupancy within 0.25 miles (0.40 km) of active bald-eagle nests and 0.5 miles (0.80 km) of active peregrine-falcon nests. They recommend excluding human activity within 0.5 miles (0.80 km) of active bald-eagle nests from December 1 through July 31 and peregrine-falcon nesting cliffs from March 15 through July 31.

=== Draft EIS treatment of peregrine-falcon habitat ===
The DEIS identifies a conflict between Alternative 2 and the White River National Forest's Wildlife General Standard 9, which addresses human activity near occupied peregrine-falcon nesting areas during the breeding season. Its alternatives comparison states that Alternative 2 would not be consistent with Standard 9 because comparable restrictions on human activity within 0.5 miles (0.80 km) of occupied nesting areas from March 15 through July 31 would not apply.

The proposed action includes an Environmentally Sensitive Zone extending about 0.25 miles (0.40 km) from the peregrine-falcon cliff bands and seasonal 400-yard (370 m) watercraft buffers for bald eagles and peregrine falcons from February 1 through August 15. For construction, the DEIS proposes a measure prohibiting the initiation of disturbance within 0.5 miles (0.80 km) of the known eyrie during the March 15–July 31 nesting period. The DEIS states that construction activity could cause peregrine falcons to avoid nesting during the year of construction and that watercraft activity could adversely affect peregrine-falcon prey availability.

The DEIS also states that the forest-plan standard's distance may be reduced according to local topography, disturbance potential, and important habitat components. In a later analysis, it concludes that Alternative 2 could be consistent with Standard 9 if the proposed mitigation measures are implemented.

In a September 15, 2026 DEIS comment signed by director Laura Clellan, CPW supported Alternative 2 and said it understood that raptor-management buffers would "not be less restrictive than the WRNF Forest Plan allows" as presented in the DEIS. It requested further discussions during annual operating planning and described using adaptive closures, seasonal restrictions, nest buffers, and monitoring.

=== Comparison with Fishers Peak State Park ===
The treatment of raptor habitat at Sweetwater Lake has been a subject of public debate. At Fishers Peak State Park, CPW regulations require all visitors to remain outside posted 0.5 miles (0.80 km) peregrine-falcon nest buffers from March 15 through July 31. A 2021 CPW commission agenda described changing the Fishers Peak seasonal restriction to correspond with the agency's raptor-buffer guidelines.

The Colorado Sun reported that Sweetwater-area residents cited Fishers Peak's seasonal visitor buffer while questioning the DEIS's proposed treatment of nesting peregrine falcons and bald eagles during the projected development period and expanded recreation.

== Public response ==
During the 2024 scoping process, Roaring Fork Audubon and the Roaring Fork Group of the Sierra Club opposed a state-park alternative and advocated alternatives with little or no new development. Their comments cited wildlife disturbance, habitat fragmentation, wetlands, water quality, and increased visitation among their concerns.

The Colorado Sun reported that residents organized through the Sweetwater Lake Working Group opposed Alternative 2 while supporting continued public access and smaller-scale improvements. According to the report, the group's primary safety concern was Sweetwater Road, described as the only 12 miles (19 km) road in and out of the area; the group argued that the DEIS did not adequately address emergency planning. Garfield County Commissioner Tom Jankovsky also raised concerns about evacuating residents and visitors during an emergency.

On August 30, 2026, Fox31 reported that a mudslide near Sweetwater Road and Colorado River Road, just north of Dotsero, completely blocked traffic in both directions. The Eagle County Sheriff's Office reported heavy debris, including boulders and mud, on Sweetwater Road.

A website titled Save Sweetwater Lake presents opposition to the proposed development and directs visitors to submit comments on the DEIS.

=== Emergency planning and 2026 agency comments ===
In its 2024 scoping comments, CPW said it was "critical" to analyze a robust emergency-response plan "for each alternative", including emergency egress, communication, and on-site response. In the September 2026 DEIS comment signed by Clellan, CPW instead supported making an emergency-response plan a condition of the selected alternative "rather than preemptively developed". It said the proposals remained conceptual and the selected alternative could change in response to public comments, and anticipated developing the plan with the Forest Service if the proposed action was selected.

Garfield County's September 21, 2026 DEIS comments urged selection of Alternative 3 and alleged that Forest Service and CPW planning for a state park before the formal NEPA process raised concerns that the outcome may have been predetermined. The Town of Gypsum also favored Alternative 3 as a baseline, stating that it best matched the small, quiet, rustic property the town had supported through the Save the Lake campaign.

On September 23, 2026, U.S. Representative Jeff Crank questioned whether early state-park planning had predetermined the outcome of the NEPA process and urged fair evaluation of all alternatives. He asked the Forest Service not to issue a record of decision until route-specific evacuation analysis covering clearance time and capacity, road impassability, responder access, and the lack of secondary egress had been completed and made available for public review. In a separate comment the same day, Representative Jeff Hurd urged the Forest Service to determine what level of use the existing road and emergency-response network could safely support before selecting a framework that would substantially increase visitation or development. He called for the final EIS to address evacuation, emergency access, road capacity, and costs borne by local governments.

== Existing recreation ==
Sweetwater Lake is used for fishing, hiking, backpacking, nonmotorized boating, horseback riding, and scenic driving. Electric motors of 5 horsepower (3.7 kW) or less are permitted, while gasoline-powered motors are prohibited. The Forest Service operates a nine-site campground near the lake.

== See also ==
- Fishers Peak State Park
- List of Colorado state parks
- List of lakes of Colorado
- Sweetwater Creek (Colorado River tributary)
