= Rifle Gap State Park =

State park in Colorado, United States

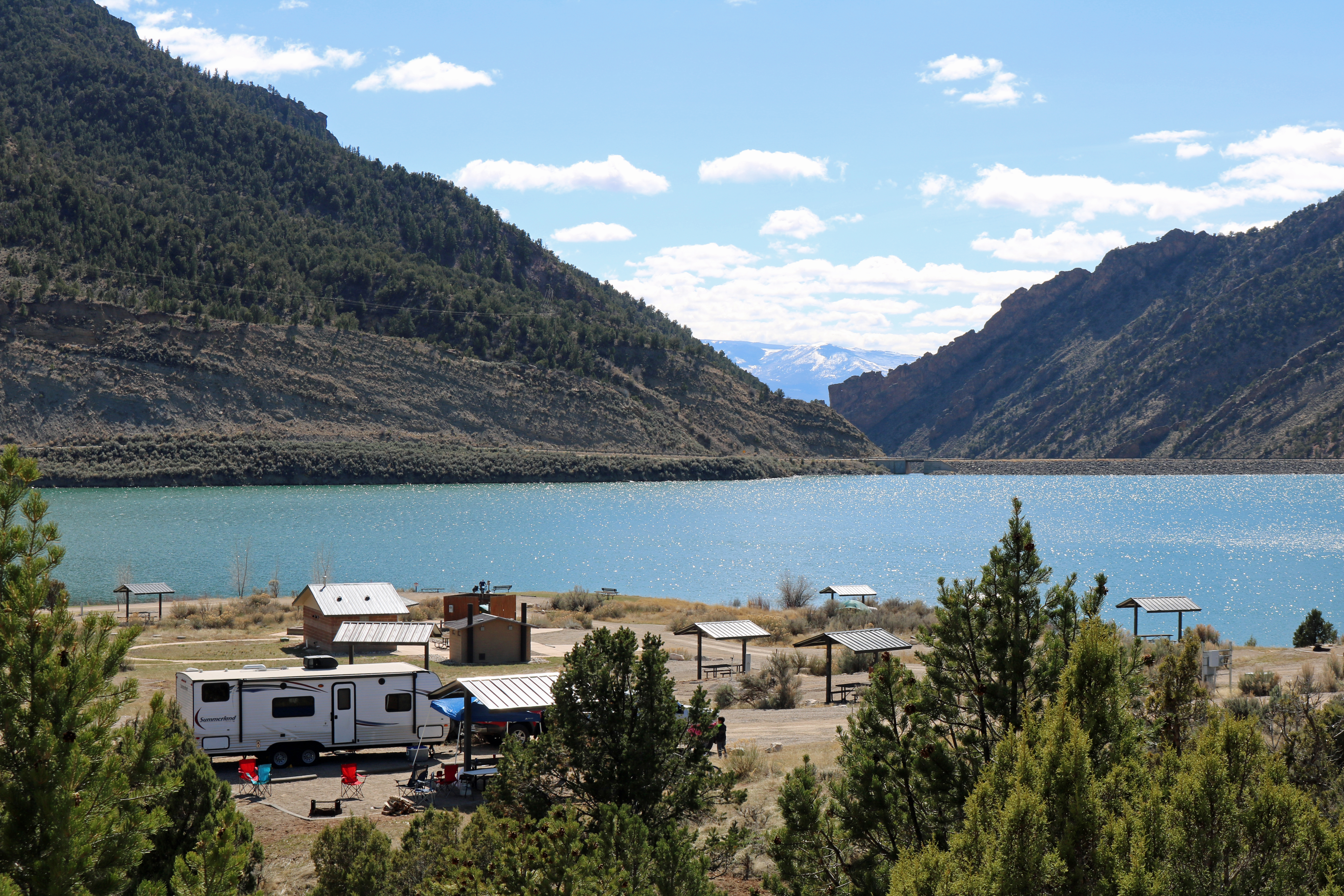
- Looking across the reservoir towards Rifle Gap.

- Location within Colorado
- Location: Garfield County, Colorado, U.S.
- Nearest city: Rifle, Colorado
- Coordinates: 39°38′05″N 107°45′18″W
- Area: 1,341 acres (543 hectares)
- Established: 1966
- Visitors: 324,971 (in 2021)
- Governing body: Colorado Parks and Wildlife

Rifle Gap State Park is a Colorado State Park located in Garfield County near Rifle, Colorado. The 1,341-acre (543-hectare) park established in 1966 includes a 360-acre (150-hectare) reservoir. Plant communities are pinyon-juniper woodlands, sagebrush shrubland with deciduous riparian forest in places along the edge of the Rifle Gap Reservoir. Commonly observed wildlife include mule deer, elk and great horned owls. Park facilities include a visitors center, campgrounds, picnic sites and a boat ramp.
