= Mancos State Park =

State park in Montezuma County, Colorado

- IUCN category V (protected landscape/seascape)
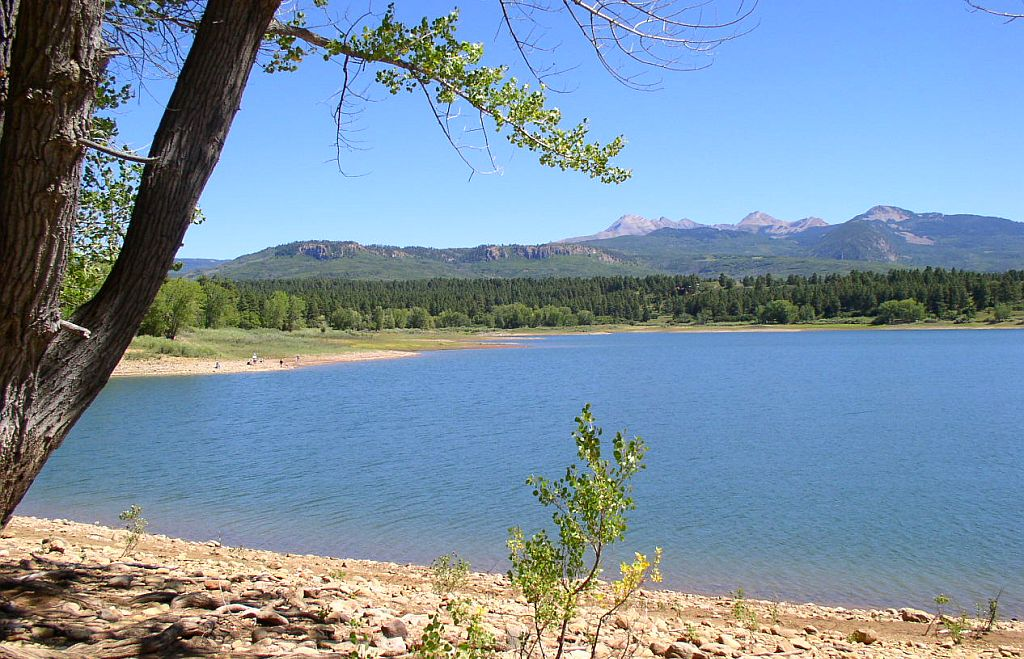
- Jackson Gulch Reservoir and the La Plata Mountains in Mancos State Park

- Location within Colorado
- Location: Montezuma County, Colorado, U.S.
- Nearest city: Mancos
- Coordinates: 37°24′1″N 108°16′12″W
- Area: 553 acres (224 ha)
- Established: 1987
- Visitors: 34,067 (in 2021)
- Governing body: Colorado Parks and Wildlife

Mancos State Park is a Colorado state park. It is located near Mesa Verde National Park, the West Mancos Trail and the San Juan Skyway. The park is known to have been a dwelling place for Ancestral Puebloans. They lived in the Four Corners area in ancient times from AD 1 to 1300. It was also later controlled by the Spanish for 200 years from the 17th to the 19th century.

In 1948 the U.S. Bureau of Reclamation commissioned the Jackson Gulch Dam, and it was officially included as a part of the Colorado state parks in 1987.
