= Staunton State Park =

State park in Colorado, United States

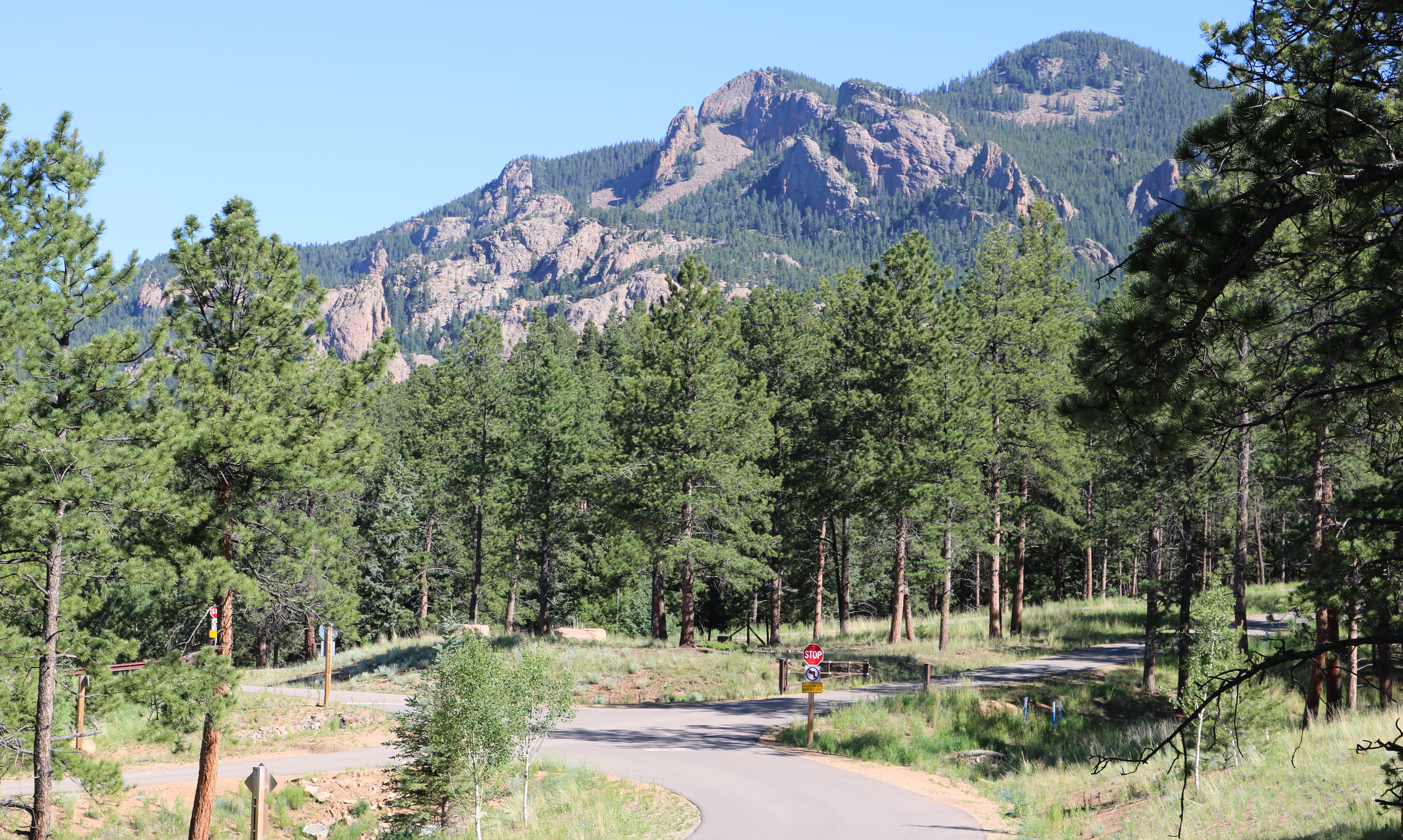
- A view of the Staunton Rocks, July 2016

- Location within Colorado
- Location: Park & Jefferson counties, Colorado, USA
- Nearest city: Conifer, CO
- Coordinates: 39°31′00″N 105°24′00″W
- Area: 3,908 acres (15.82 km^{2})
- Established: 2013
- Visitors: 246,155 (in 2021)
- Governing body: Colorado Parks and Wildlife

Staunton State Park is a Colorado state park in Park and Jefferson counties, located 6 miles (9.7 km) west of Conifer, Colorado. The 3,908-acre (1,582 ha) park, which opened on May 18, 2013, includes dramatic rock outcroppings, several streams and a waterfall. On December 4, 2012, the property was also listed on the National Register of Historic Places as Staunton Ranch-Rural Historic Landscape.

== History ==
The park was created out of a gift by Frances H. Staunton, who donated the original 1,720 acres to the State of Colorado. Ms. Staunton required the land "be preserved in perpetuity, for public benefit, as a natural wilderness-type park... typifying Colorado's most beautiful mountain forest and meadow region". Since 1986, the State of Colorado acquired additional lands through the Great Outdoors Colorado (GOCO) lottery proceeds. These include the Elk Falls Ranch, portions of the Davis Ranch, and property once owned by playwright Mary Coyle Chase. In 2015 former Colorado Legislator Allen Dines donated his 80-acre (32 ha) ranch to the park, bringing its total acreage to 3,908 acres (1,582 ha). The Staunton Ranch was added to the National Register of Historic Places for exemplifying a pattern of homesteading, ranching, and use as a summer resort. It is also considered notable for its rustic architecture and for containing the area's only sawmill.

The park's recreational offerings include rock climbing, multi-use trails for hiking, biking, and horseback riding, stream and pond fishing, and picnicking.

== See also ==
- List of Colorado state parks
