= Paradise Park Natural Area =

Natural area in Rocky Mountain National Park, Colorado

- Location within Colorado
- Location: Rocky Mountain National Park, Grand County, Colorado, United States
- Nearest city: Grand Lake, Colorado
- Coordinates: 40°11′53″N 105°43′09″W
- Area: 6,032 acres (24.41 km^{2})
- Established: 1983
- Governing body: National Park Service

Paradise Park Natural Area is a natural area in Rocky Mountain National Park, Colorado, several miles east of Grand Lake. It protects the upper Paradise Creek basin, encompassing several alpine lakes, alpine meadows, and virgin spruce-fir forest. Paradise Creek contains pure strains of Colorado River cutthroat trout. The area is also adjacent to the Hell Canyon Natural Area in the Indian Peaks wilderness.

== See also ==
- List of Colorado Natural Areas
