= Rifle Falls State Park =

State park in Garfield County, Colorado

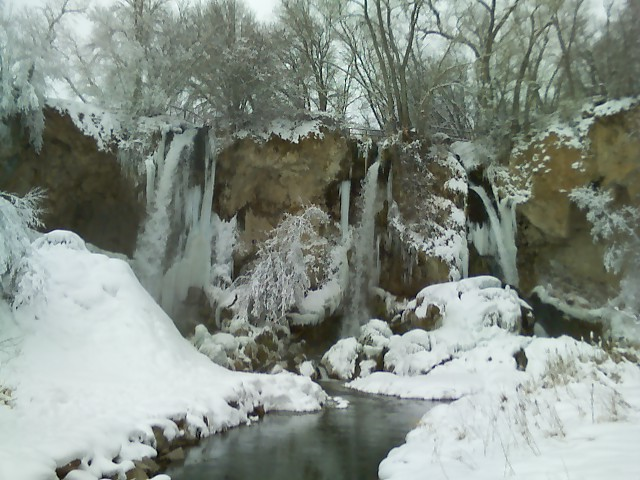
- Snow and ice covered falls in the park

- Location within Colorado
- Location: Garfield County, Colorado, USA
- Nearest city: Rifle, Colorado
- Coordinates: 39°40′26″N 107°42′00″W
- Area: 48 acres (0.19 km^{2})
- Established: 1966
- Visitors: 171,415 (in 2021)
- Governing body: Colorado Parks and Wildlife

Rifle Falls State Park is a Colorado State Park located in Garfield County northeast of Rifle, Colorado. The central feature of the 48-acre (19-hectare) park is Rifle Falls, a triple 70-foot (21-meter) waterfall flowing over a travertine dam on East Rifle Creek. Commonly seen wildlife includes mule deer, elk, coyote, and golden-mantled ground squirrel. Rainbow and brown trout can be caught in the creek. Limestone cliffs near the falls have a few small caves and three species of bats. Visitor facilities include campsites, picnic sites and 2.0 miles (3.2 kilometers) of hiking trails.

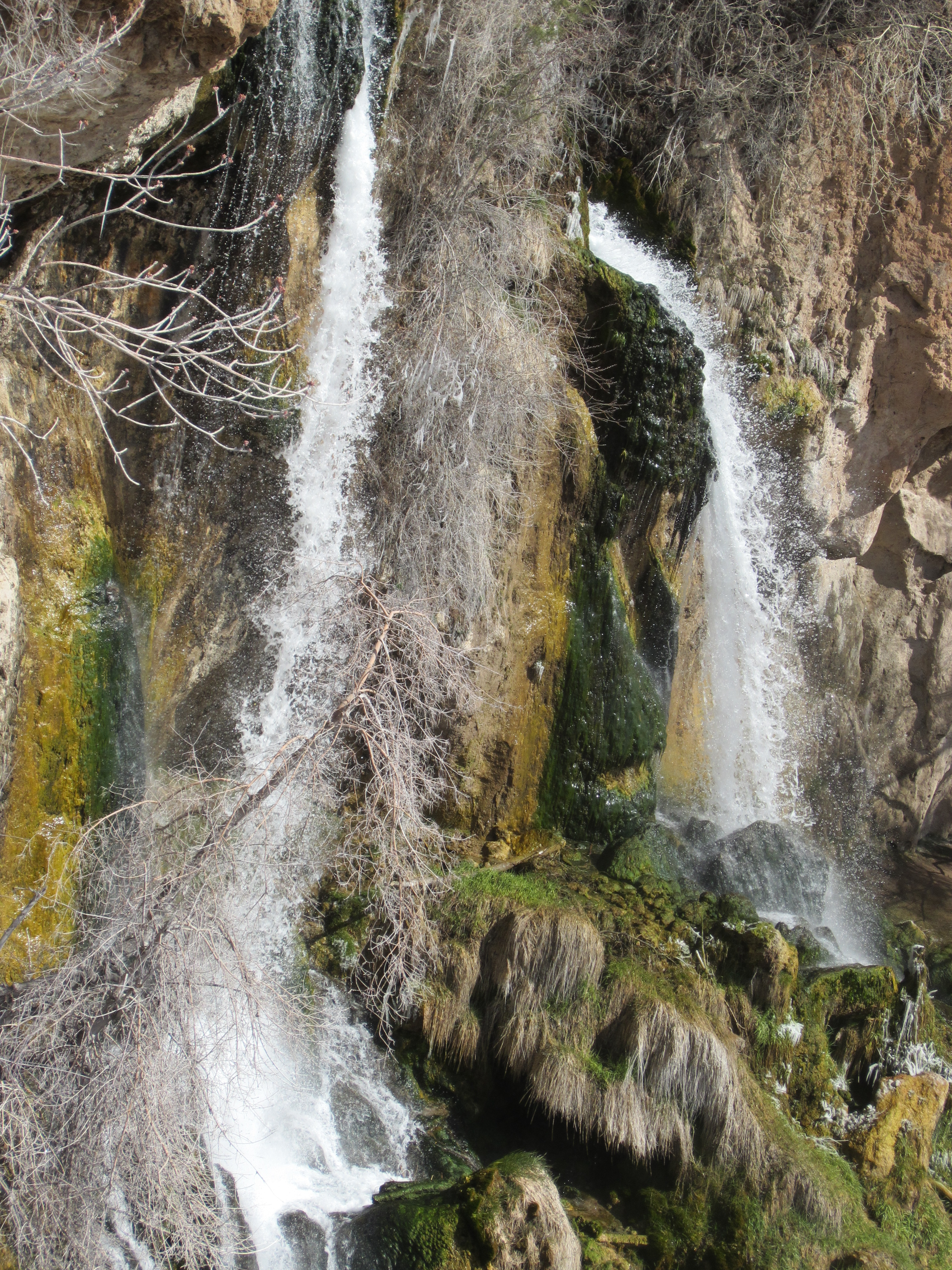
Waterfalls at Rifle Falls State Park

Rifle Falls State Park is in an accessible and scenic location. The falls is located approximately 50 yards (46 meters) from the parking area with a relatively flat path adjoining the two areas. The picnic and camping area near the parking lot offers grassy yard, restrooms, and potable water.

There is a short hike that leads up and around the top of the falls. The trail is fairly steep and rocky but is only about one mile (1,600 meters) round trip. Along the way there are several caves that visitors can explore. The hike also leads to a rock ledge behind one of the falls offering a lovely (if a little bit misty) view.
