= St. Vrain State Park =

State park in Weld County, Colorado

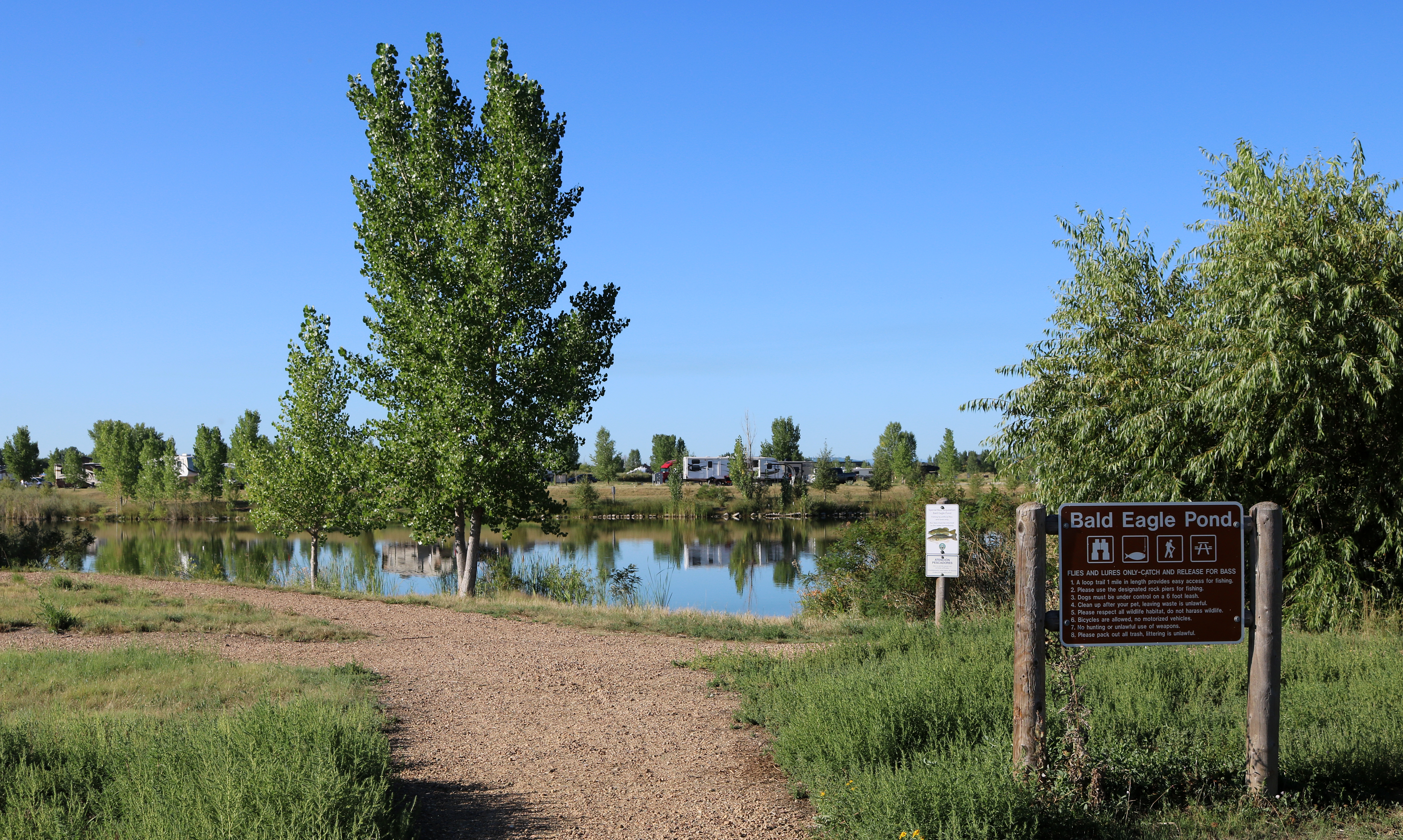
- Bald Eagle Pond in the park.

- Location within Colorado
- Location: Weld County, Colorado, USA
- Nearest city: Firestone, CO
- Coordinates: 40°10′05″N 104°59′29″W
- Area: 688 acres (2.78 km^{2})
- Established: 1965
- Visitors: 283,472 (in 2021)
- Governing body: Colorado Parks and Wildlife
- Website: https://cpw.state.co.us/state-parks/st-vrain-state-park

St. Vrain State Park, formerly known as Barbour Ponds, is a Colorado state park. The park hosts year-round camping. It is a popular birding destination, hosting the states largest rookery of Blue Heron, it is home to several other bird species as well including migrating waterfowl, songbirds and the occasional bald eagle. Other park activities include year round fishing and hiking. There is a reservoir at the park named Blue Heron Reservoir.

== History ==
=== 1800s ===
The land of St. Vrain State Park was originally home to Ute, Arapaho, and Cheyenne Native American tribes. Once claimed by Spain then France who sold it to the United States in 1803 as part of the Louisiana Purchase. Having just made the largest land purchase in the history of the nation, the government was eager to discover what $15,000,000 had bought. They sent out scouts, Meriwether Lewis and William Clark, then Army Lieutenant Zebulon Pike to explore. Although neither group traveled in the area, their descriptions of the land and a growing fur trade encouraged adventurers to head west. In 1817, the US War Department sent Stephen Long, a Major in the Topographical Engineers, to explore the upper Mississippi. Following the North and South Platte Rivers, Long likely saw the St. Vrain Valley in July 1820.

In 1848, gold was discovered in California bringing a wave of eager gold-seekers headed west. A few made their fortunes, but more often prospectors headed home with empty pockets or found work in the communities that had sprung up around the prospectors. Some who left the goldfields found their fortune in land and sent word to their families. That sparked a new wave of immigrants moving west. The Oregon Trail passed by Fort Laramie, north of the St. Vrain Valley, and was a major route for the steady stream of immigrants moving from east to west. Historians estimate a combined 150,000 prospectors and immigrants traveled through Fort Laramie, north of the St Vrain Valley, between 1841 and 1853. Native Americans watching these travelers had cause for concern; their way of life was in jeopardy. The immigrants did not understand the Native American tribes any more than the Native Americans understood them. Tensions rose. Although the government tried to address the issues through treaties, the government also broke those treaties. Bison hunters actively sought hides decimating the Native Americans' food supply while settlers were encroaching on what was supposed to be their land. The Native Americans' only recourse was to push the white men out.

In 1858, gold was discovered near Denver. Another wave of adventurers set off seeking their fortune. Again a few were lucky, but far more became discouraged with the search and left the goldfields. Many of them found land to their liking and made a home. Agriculture began to develop and cities were formed. Milo Smith, Perry L. Smith, and Elisha Duncan settled east of St. Vrain Creek and Boulder Creek on land that would one day become St. Vrain State Park. Life was good along the St. Vrain, but stories of trouble with Native Americas made the settlers wary. In June 1864 the Hungate family, living northeast of Denver City, was murdered by a raiding tribe. The settlers felt they needed to protect themselves, so they formed the Home Guard with 4 officers and 58 volunteers. The government provided each man a six-shooter and a rifle, and they drilled twice monthly on Elisha Duncan's homestead. Perry L. Smith donated a plot of land for a fort, and the community came together in July to build a sod fort. They cut the sod into strips one foot wide and two feet long and stacked them like bricks. The walls were two feet thick. The fort was 100 feet by 130 feet with portholes large enough to shoot through spaced every eight feet wide and eight feet high above the ground. There were sod benches two feet wide and three feet high lining the walls, so defenders could move along any wall in any direction to protect the fort from attack. Inside two structures were built in opposite corners to store supplies. Their roofs could be used as observation towers. They filled voids or gaps in the walls with mud and coated the walls from the bottom to the top both inside and out. Because it was close to where the St. Vrain and Boulder Creek join, it was called Fort Junction.

In August 1864, Elbridge Gerry made a historic ride along the South Platte to warn settlers of an impending attack. Two men were sent from the Platteville station to warn settlers along the lower Boulder and St. Vrain. Community members loaded their valuables into wagons and rushed to the fort, but no attack ever came. After a few days, everyone went back home. From February 1866 to May 1867, Fort Junction was used as a post office with Perry L. Smith appointed as postmaster. Then in 1868 three other settlers were killed and the fort was used once again to protect settlers, but again there was no attack. After that, the fort was used as an occasional stopover place for travelers, and eventually, it was absorbed back into the prairie.

The Chicago Colony Colorado came to the St. Vrain Valley in 1872 as one of only a few successful planned colonies in the Colorado Territory and was incorporated as Longmont in 1873. Then in the late 1800s, a coal seam was discovered in the Carbon Valley, southeast of present-day St. Vrain State Park. The McKissick Mine was opened in 1887 and others followed drawing coal miners, not just from the United States, but also from Greece, France, Bulgaria, and Italy. Those miners settled in and around three distinct towns. Frederick is in the middle and incorporated first in 1907. It was followed by Dacono in 1908 to the south, and Firestone in 1908 to the north. These towns grew up around the mines and miners. Although the mines were all shut down by the 1970s, fossil fuels continue to be a big part of the area economy. They now drill for gas.

=== 1900s ===
After the turn of the century, people began depending on cars rather than wagons. The Colorado Department of Transportation first built highway 87 then as early as the late 1940s began to rebuild it as an interstate highway running from Wyoming south to New Mexico. Building roads requires a lot of gravel, so in 1958 the Department of Transportation purchased land along the St. Vrain from Edwin and Albert Anderson to mine the needed gravel. In 1961 the highway was completed north to Highway 66, and the Department of Transportation no longer needed the gravel pit. At first, they thought the Department of Wildlife might use it for a fish hatchery, but flooding changed those plans. Instead in 1962, the gravel ponds were turned over to the State Parks Department for a state recreation area. It was up to the Parks Department to turn the 50 acres of land and 80 acres of water into a recreation area named for Roy N. Barbour, an area resident and avid conservationist who was credited with helping to establish a chapter of the Izaak Walton League in Longmont. Game, Fish, and Parks improved existing roads, built new ones, and spent $6,529 to install four toilets, five shade shelters, picnic tables, and grills to prepare the area for visitors. Two of the ponds were reserved for carp. Others received species such as bluegill, sunfish, bass, and bullheads. Trout were not stocked because the water is too warm for their survival.

Barbour Ponds drew visitors from the Denver area in search of fishing and seasonal duck hunting. In 1967 the area had 60,000 visitors. In 1968 the state allocated $55,000 to construct a 25 site campground with modern sanitary facilities, running water, turnouts and shade shelters, tables and grills. As visitation continued to grow the park service made more improvements. In 1975 the park roads remained closed a little later than usual as park personnel did some upgrades. When it opened in July of that year, it had received a facelift with significant improvements. There were 75 campsites, improved parking, and paving provided a better experience for visitors. In 1977 Muskrat Nature Trail was built with help from the Youth Conservation Corp. In 1980 a Boy Scouts of America Eagle project planned to raise the level of the boardwalk on the nature trail. Area newspapers sang the area's praises with articles such as, "Nearby Flatland Nature Preserve, Protects Beauty of the Prairie.

In 1994, the State Department of Transportation project to rebuild the I-25 Highway 119 intersection led to a resurgence of interest in Fort Junction. A ground-penetrating radar survey revealed possible ruins. Construction was halted and archeologists were called in, but the only artifacts found were a chair leg less than 20 years old. A historical marker commemorating the fort was moved from the northwest corner of the intersection to its current location near the Park-N-Ride on the southeast corner, and construction resumed. But interest in the old fort was sparked. Johnnie St. Vrain, a columnist for the Longmont Daily Times-Call, reported on the archeological activity and got three different possible locations for the fort. The first reader said the fort was built about a mile west of the confluence of the rivers. That was supported by another who said according to a map of the Colorado Territory at the Library of Congress, the fort was just west of the confluence. That would mean it was somewhere between the current car dealership on the south side of Highway 119 and the confluence of the rivers. Another reader wrote in that area farmers had found remains, and it was just where the marker suggested about, "200 yards due east," of the original marker location, that would put the fort near the highway. Another person, who had been studying the fort for a long time and had a hand-drawn map from the time when the fort was used as a postal stop, believes the fort was built on land now owned by St. Vrain State Park. He used satellite imagery, but because the fort had been constructed of sod, there would be no foundation. He was looking for a raised area roughly 100 by 130 feet where the sod had been absorbed into the ground. He did find a promising area, but nothing definitive was ever found.

=== Recent history ===
The land was the beginning, but the plans would require almost $15 million over 10 years to develop new recreational opportunities at St. Vrain State Park. The plan included adding five more ponds from pits dug by gravel companies and a network of trails that will help connect open lands, park areas, and trails from Longmont under I-25 into Weld County. They also planned to add campsites with both water and electric bringing the total number of campsites to 160. By 2004 a new entry station was built, water and electric were installed, and preliminary work was done for improvements through 2007. In 2005 trees and bushes that would provide a buffer for and animal habitat were planted along the south and east boundaries of the park. These buffer zones would be irrigated using a ditch and playa concept. Forty-five new campsites were built with water, sewer and electricity. The road around Pelican Pond and the southern portion of the park were permanently closed to vehicular use. Americorp volunteers helped to plant 100 large cottonwoods in the new campground. Mallard pond was restored with new shoreline grading, rock fishing piers and native plantings along the shoreline. The Boy Scouts and Girl Scouts joined to help plant a native garden at the new camper services building. Youth Corp helped with fencing and weed control. Americorp came back later in April with 600 volunteers for another session and planted 5000 trees and shrubs to finish the wildlife habitat buffer. In 2006 dry weather put all the new plantings at risk and kept park personnel in crisis mode watering everything to keep it alive until monsoon rains dropped 1.5 inches of water in July averting a plant die-off. In the fall Pelican Pond got shoreline grading and seeding. Two Boy Scouts working on their Eagle projects helped with plant restoration activities at Pelican Pond. St. Vrain State Park had been transformed from a "little fishing park" to a restored riparian area earning praise from area newspapers.

In May 2015, Blue Heron Reservoir opened helping to commemorate the 50th anniversary of the park. It is the largest Great Blue Heron rookery in the state. Visitors who came to celebrate the park's anniversary would have been able to walk nature trails around ten of the ponds, enjoy birdwatching, and photography. They could spend the night in up to date campsites, fish in stocked ponds, and enjoy views of Longs Peak.

== Present day ==
Compared to when it was first seen by Stephen Long, St. Vrain State Park is much bigger and more natural, having been returned to a wetland area. And at the same time that it is more developed. Campsites will accommodate modern rigs, a Camper Services building with showers, miles of walking trails, and acclaimed fishing. Fish and waterfowl populations are thriving. Native vegetation is once again doing well, and visitors can now see mammals including coyote, rabbits, fox, deer, or maybe even a moose.

St. Vrain State Park is working with nine other parks on 'augmented reality' to help visitors have an interactive experience in the park.
