= Rifle, Colorado =

City in Colorado, United States

- Home rule municipality
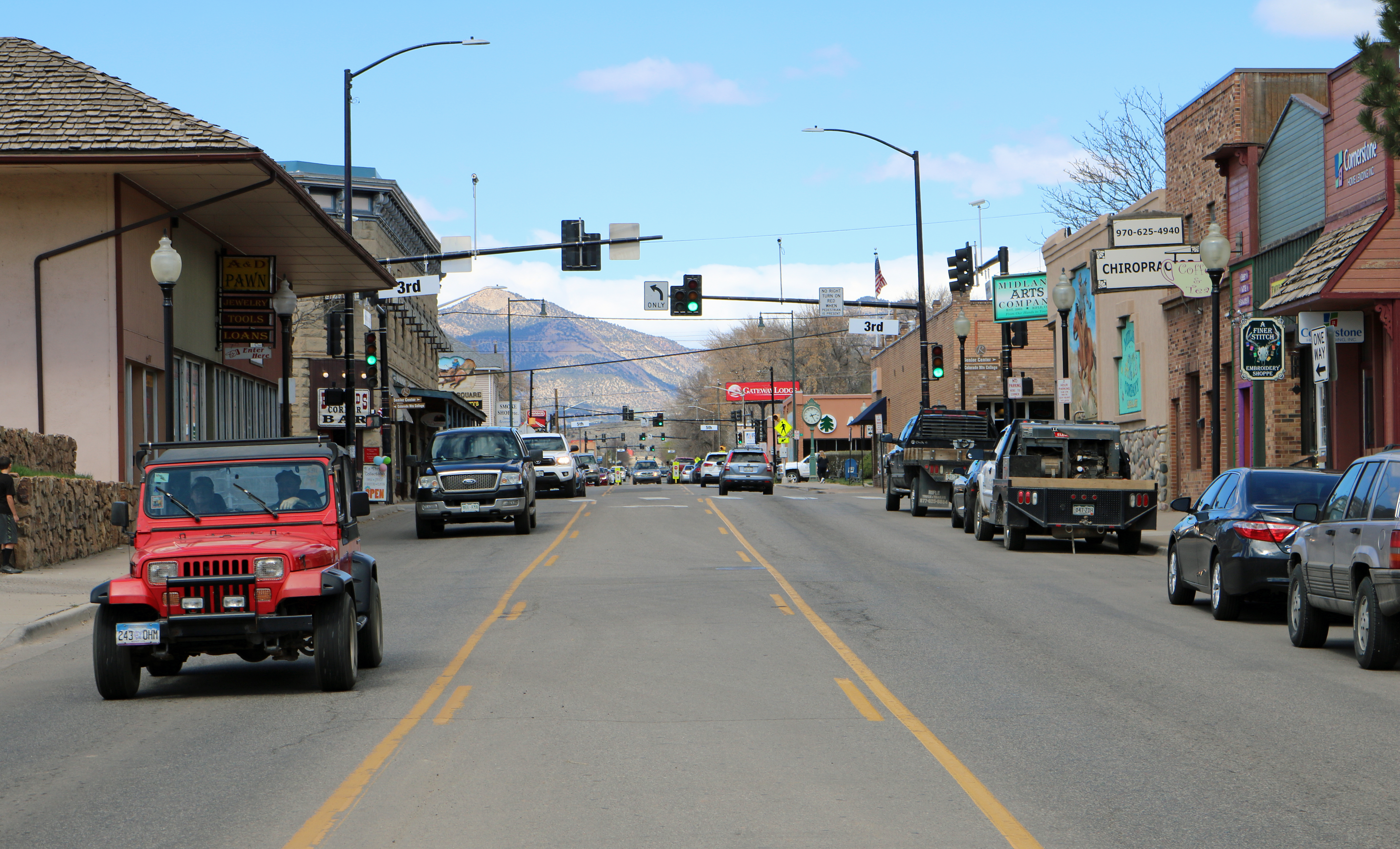
- Railroad Avenue in Rifle looking north.

- Location in Garfield County and Colorado
- Coordinates: 39°32′05″N 107°46′22″W
- Country: United States
- State: Colorado
- County: Garfield County
- City: Rifle
- Founded: 1882
- Incorporated: August 18, 1905
- Founder: Abram Maxfield
- Named for: Rifle Creek

Government
  - Type: Home-rule municipality

Area
  - Total: 7.15 sq mi (18.53 km^{2})
  - Land: 7.03 sq mi (18.22 km^{2})
  - Water: 0.12 sq mi (0.31 km^{2})
- Elevation: 5,519 ft (1,682 m)

Population (2020)
  - Total: 10,437
  - Density: 1,379.8/sq mi (532.75/km^{2})
- Time zone: UTC-7 (Mountain (MST))
  - Summer (DST): UTC-6 (MDT)
- ZIP code: 81650
- Area code: 970
- FIPS code: 08-64255
- GNIS feature ID: 2410947
- Website: www.rifleco.org

Rifle is a home-rule municipality in, and the most populous community of, Garfield County, Colorado, United States. Its population was 10,437 at the 2020 census. Rifle is a regional center of the cattle-ranching industry located along Interstate 70 and the Colorado River just east of the Roan Plateau, which dominates the western skyline of the town. The town was founded in 1882 by Abram Maxfield, and was incorporated in 1905 along Rifle Creek, near its mouth on the Colorado. The community takes its name from the creek.

== History ==
In 1878, Nathan Meeker was appointed as the director of the White River Ute Agency (the town of Meeker 40 miles north of Rifle was named after him). Meeker had no training or knowledge of Ute culture, and launched into a campaign centered on sedentary agriculture and European-American schooling. As this clashed with the culture of the nomadic Utes, he was met with resistance. It all came to a head when Meeker had the pasture and racetrack for the Ute's horses plowed under. The event that followed is known as the Meeker Massacre in 1879, during which Meeker and his 10 employees were killed. The aftermath of the conflict resulted in nearly all members of the Ute nation being forcibly removed from Colorado into eastern Utah, although the federal government had formerly guaranteed them the land on which they were residing.

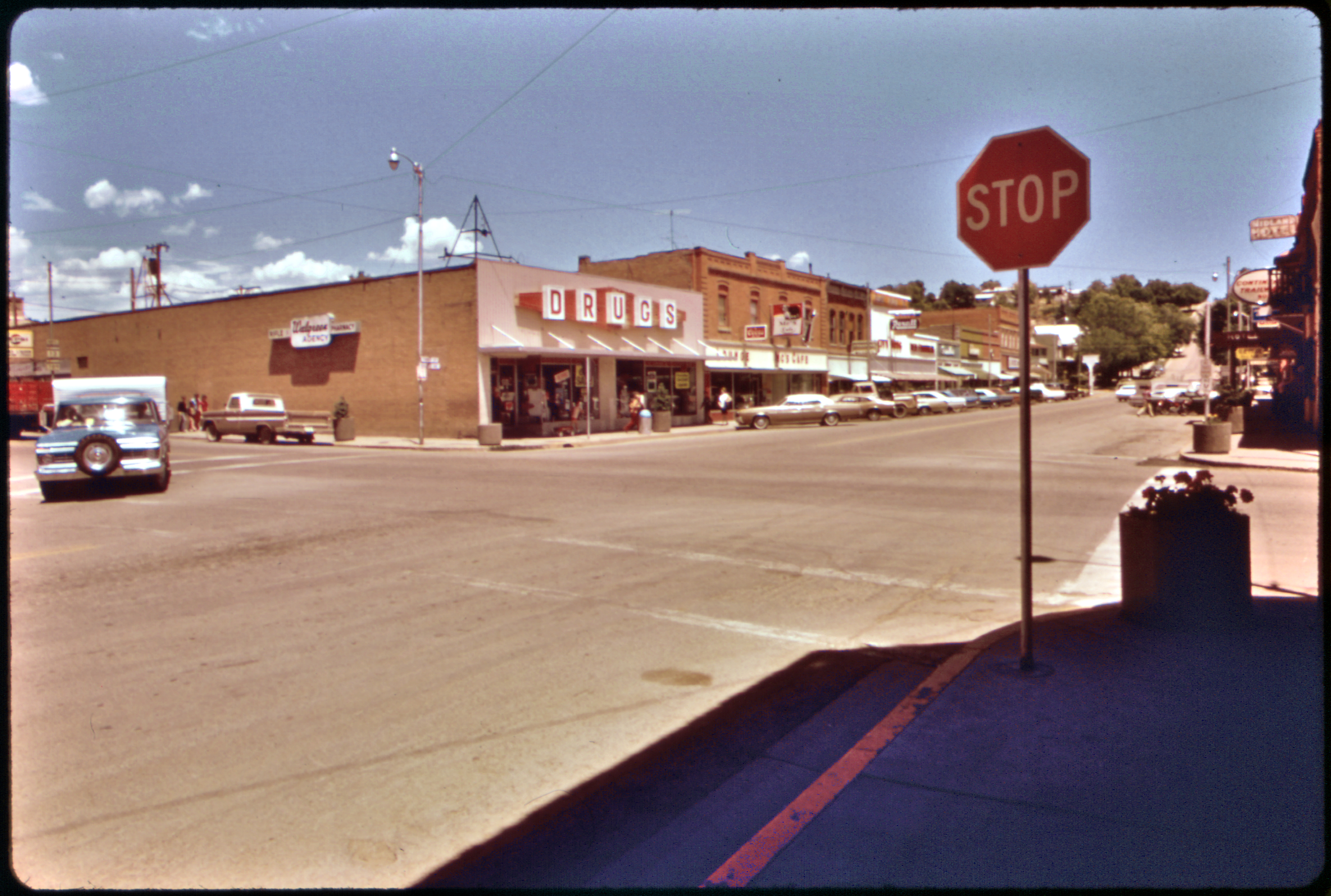
Rifle in 1973

Rifle became more and more settled as the 19th century gave way to the 20th. In 1889, the railroad cut through from the east and ended in Rifle for a while before connecting lines were completed. This opened up the floodgates for new travelers, settlers, and trade. Long drives of cattle over the mountains towards the Front Range and Denver became a thing of the past. Rifle was now a thriving hub for commerce. If it needed to be shipped east to a buyer's market, or shipped west into ranching country, it came through the town.

The first major economy known to Rifle was ranching. The land surrounding the town was arid, and much of it was unsuitable for farming without irrigation. Despite the large stretches of land available, tension arose and manifested between those who tended cattle and those who herded sheep. Good grazing practices were not in place, and the summer pastures at the top of the Roan Plateau were contested. One rancher lost two-thirds of his flock and went bankrupt when competing cowboys drove the sheep over the cliff.

Rifle is located in the east portion of the Piceance Basin, which is home to different forms of fossil fuels, the largest quantity of which is oil shale. The unreliability of this fossil fuel has left the city in the throes of a cycling boom-and-bust economy.

As of 2007, an organization called the Campaign to Save Roan Plateau has been engaged in an effort to minimize oil and gas drilling on the top of the Roan Plateau, which locals call the Bookcliffs. The Roan Plateau is accessible from the JQS Trail, located 3 miles (5 km) north of Rifle, or from the Piceance Creek road.

== Geography ==
Rifle is located in the valley of the Colorado River where Rifle Creek joins from the north. Most of the city is on the north side of the river, but some city land lies to the south. Interstate 70 passes through the city along the south side of the river, with access from Exit 90. I-70 leads east 26 miles (42 km) to Glenwood Springs, the Garfield County seat, and southwest 60 miles (97 km) to Grand Junction. U.S. Route 6 runs along the north side of the Colorado River through Rifle, providing a local parallel route to I-70. Colorado State Highway 13 intersects I-70 and US-6, passing through the southern and western parts of Rifle, then leading north 41 miles (66 km) to Meeker.

According to the United States Census Bureau, the city of Rifle has a total area of 5.7 square miles (14.7 km^{2}), of which 0.1 square miles (0.2 km^{2}), or 1.18%, is covered by water.

=== Climate ===
Climate data for Rifle, 1991-2020 normals
Month	Jan	Feb	Mar	Apr	May	Jun	Jul	Aug	Sep	Oct	Nov	Dec	Year
Record high °F (°C)	62 (17)	69 (21)	81 (27)	92 (33)	99 (37)	102 (39)	104 (40)	102 (39)	99 (37)	88 (31)	79 (26)	65 (18)	104 (40)
Mean daily maximum °F (°C)	36.8 (2.7)	43.5 (6.4)	55.4 (13.0)	62.9 (17.2)	74.3 (23.5)	86.4 (30.2)	92.1 (33.4)	88.9 (31.6)	80.0 (26.7)	65.5 (18.6)	49.7 (9.8)	37.3 (2.9)	64.4 (18.0)
Mean daily minimum °F (°C)	13.4 (−10.3)	19.8 (−6.8)	27.0 (−2.8)	32.6 (0.3)	40.2 (4.6)	47.9 (8.8)	55.3 (12.9)	53.6 (12.0)	45.0 (7.2)	33.6 (0.9)	23.3 (−4.8)	14.0 (−10.0)	33.8 (1.0)
Record low °F (°C)	−38 (−39)	−34 (−37)	−16 (−27)	4 (−16)	17 (−8)	22 (−6)	33 (1)	31 (−1)	21 (−6)	7 (−14)	−16 (−27)	−27 (−33)	−38 (−39)
Average precipitation inches (mm)	0.70 (18)	0.60 (15)	0.76 (19)	1.01 (26)	1.14 (29)	0.68 (17)	0.96 (24)	1.07 (27)	1.34 (34)	1.27 (32)	0.63 (16)	0.57 (14)	10.73 (271)
Source 1: weather.com
Source 2: xmACIS2

== Demographics ==
Historical population
Census	Pop.	Note	%±
1900	273		—
1910	698		155.7%
1920	865		23.9%
1930	1,287		48.8%
1940	1,373		6.7%
1950	1,525		11.1%
1960	2,135		40.0%
1970	2,150		0.7%
1980	3,215		49.5%
1990	4,636		44.2%
2000	6,784		46.3%
2010	9,172		35.2%
2020	10,437		13.8%
U.S. Decennial Census

As of the census of 2010, 9,172 people, 3,221 households, and 2,230 families resided in the city. The population density was 1,581.1 inhabitants per square mile (610.5/km^{2}). The 2,586 housing units had an average density of 602.7 per square mile (232.7/km^{2}). The racial makeup of the city was 81.0% White, 0.5% African American, 1.3% Native American, 0.6% Asian American, 0.1% Pacific Islander, 13.4% from other races, and 3.1% from two or more races. Hispanics or Latinos of any race were 30.4% of the population.

Of the 3,221 households, 40.0% had children under 18 living with them, 30.8% were married couples living together, 10.1% had a female householder with no husband present, and 30.8% were not families. About 23.5% of all households were made up of individuals, and 7.1% had someone living alone who was 65 or older. The average household size was 2.81 and the average family size was 3.35.

In the city, the age distribution was 30.6% under 18, 9.2% from 18 to 24, 34.4% from 25 to 44, 17.1% from 45 to 64, and 8.5% who were 65 or older. The median age was 31 years. For every 100 females, there were 106.1 males. For every 100 females 18 and over, there were 105.7 males.

The median income for a household in the city was $42,734, and for a family was $48,714. Males had a median income of $36,517 versus $25,527 for females. The per capita income for the city was $17,376. About 3.4% of families and 6.4% of the population were below the poverty line, including 7.8% of those under age 18 and 9.8% of those age 65 or over.

== Tourism and attractions ==
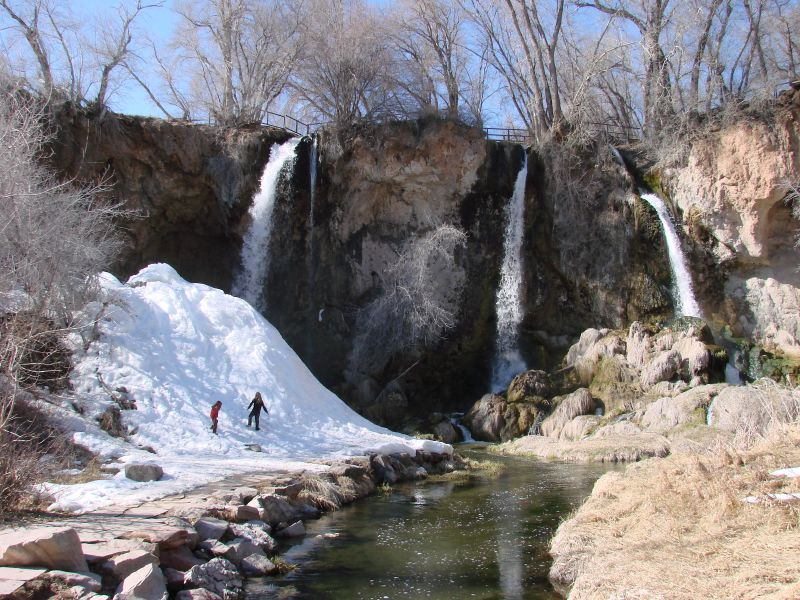
Rifle Falls State Park, north of Rifle

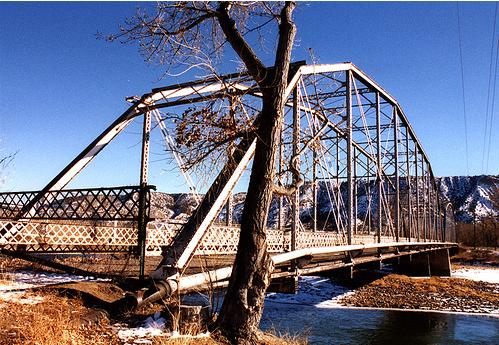
Rifle Bridge in winter on the Colorado River. The bridge, built in 1909, is now closed to traffic and is listed on the National Register of Historic Places.

Rifle Mountain Park, located 16 miles (26 km) north of Rifle, is maintained by the City of Rifle. It is popular with rock climbers. Other outside attractions near the city include Rifle Falls State Park, Rifle Falls Fish Hatchery, Rifle Gap State Park, Harvey Gap State Park, and access to BLM land, including Hubbard Mesa Open Area, Rifle Arch, and the Roan Plateau.

Six miles north of the center of the city is Rifle Creek Golf Course.

in 2014, the New Ute theater was opened in downtown Rifle.

Rifle is home to the Garfield County Fair Grounds. One week out of the year, the city bustles with activities surrounding family and professional rodeos, Xtreme bull riding, live music, and a demolition derby.

== Education ==
Rifle is within the Garfield Re-2 School District. The city is served by three elementary schools, a middle school, and a high school:

- Graham Mesa Elementary School
- Highland Elementary School
- Wamsley Elementary School
- Rifle Middle School
- Rifle High School

Rifle’s higher-education needs are served by Colorado Mountain College, which operates a campus just east of the city. In 2022, CMC Rifle had an enrollment of 1,346 students.

== Transportation ==
The city is served by the Rifle Garfield County Airport. The state-run bus service Bustang connects Rifle to Grand Junction and Denver. The city is also served by the Union Pacific/Rio Grande line between Denver and Ogden.

== In popular culture ==
On August 10, 1972, Christo and Jeanne-Claude completed the Valley Curtain project at Rifle Gap, 6 miles (10 km) north of town. The completed curtain hung for only 28 hours before it was ripped by a gust of wind.

== Notable people ==
- David Bernhardt, former secretary of the interior
- Lauren Boebert, U.S. Representative
- Bo Nickal, freestyle wrestler and mixed martial artist

== See also ==
- List of municipalities in Colorado
- Outline of Colorado
