= Harvey Gap State Park =

State park in Garfield County, Colorado

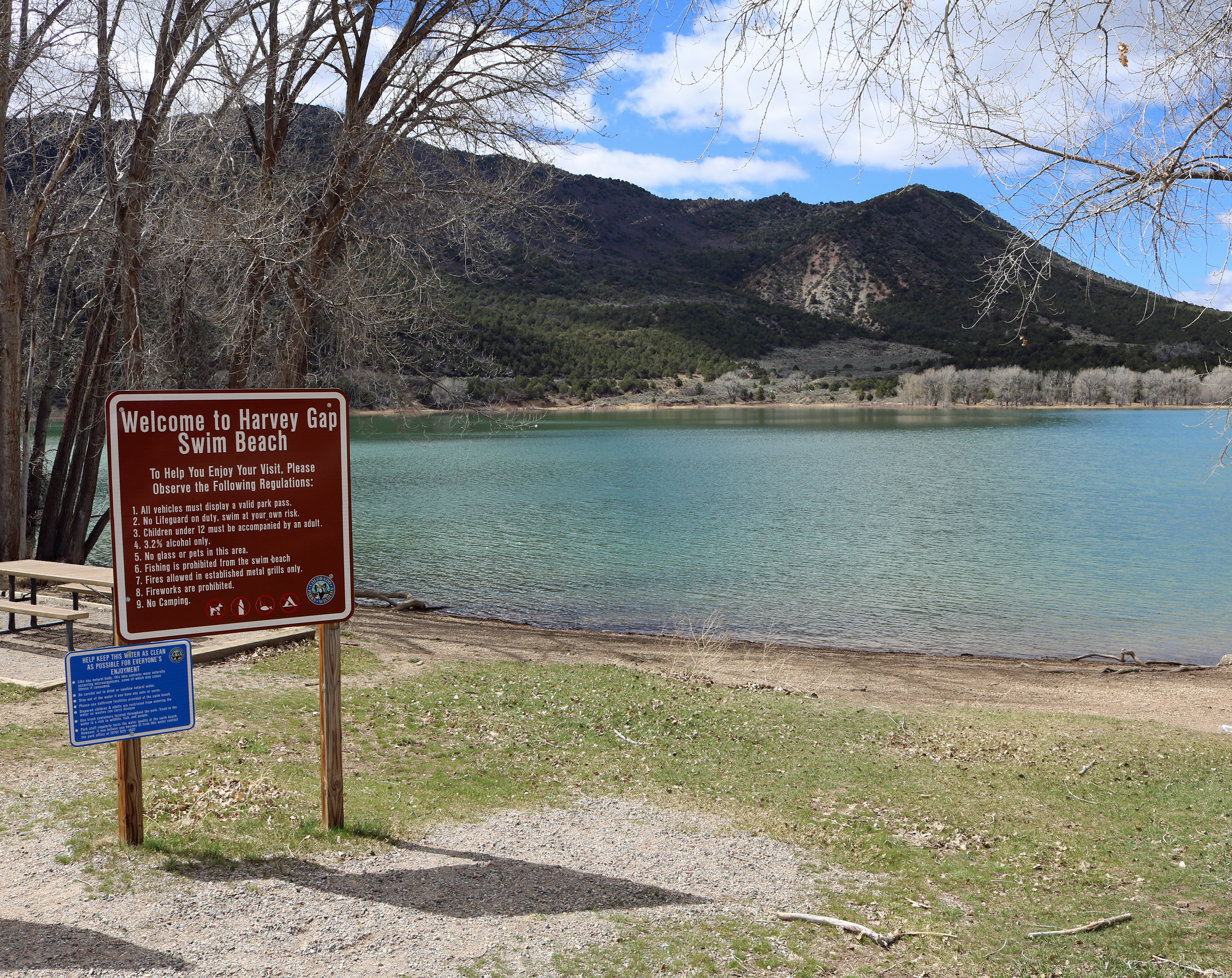
- One of the swimming beaches at the park.

- Location within Colorado
- Location: Garfield County, Colorado, U.S.
- Nearest city: Rifle, Colorado
- Coordinates: 39°36′52″N 107°39′22″W
- Area: 320 acres (1.3 km^{2})
- Established: 1987
- Visitors: 79,880 (in 2021)
- Governing body: Colorado Parks and Wildlife

Harvey Gap State Park, is a Colorado state park founded in 1987. It is well known for its fishing and limited use boating. The park's reservoir—Grass Valley Reservoir—is 190 acres (0.77 km^{2}) when full and allows fishing year round.
