= El Campo, California =

El Campo
- Private recreational facility
- Location in California El Campo (the United States)
- Coordinates: 37°53′51″N 122°27′55″W
- Country: United States
- State: California
- County: Marin County
- Elevation: 56 ft (17 m)

El Campo (later renamed Paradise Beach) was a picnic resort established in 1891 by the San Francisco and North Pacific Railroad in hopes of increasing ridership on their ferries between San Francisco and Marin. Facilities at the resort included a dance pavilion, merry-go-round, bowling alley, fishing pier, shooting gallery and over 100 acres of picnic grounds. The resort became such a popular attraction that crowds lined up on the pier in San Francisco on the weekend to catch the ferry to the resort. Because the site was only accessible by ferry, a local newspaper wrote that families could enjoy "absolute freedom from the incursions of hoodlums."

The name, El Campo, is derived from a Spanish phrase meaning "the flat country". The site was located on the San Francisco Bay, 3 miles (4.8 km) south-southeast of Point San Quentin.
