= State Forest State Park =

State park in Jackson and Larimer counties, Colorado

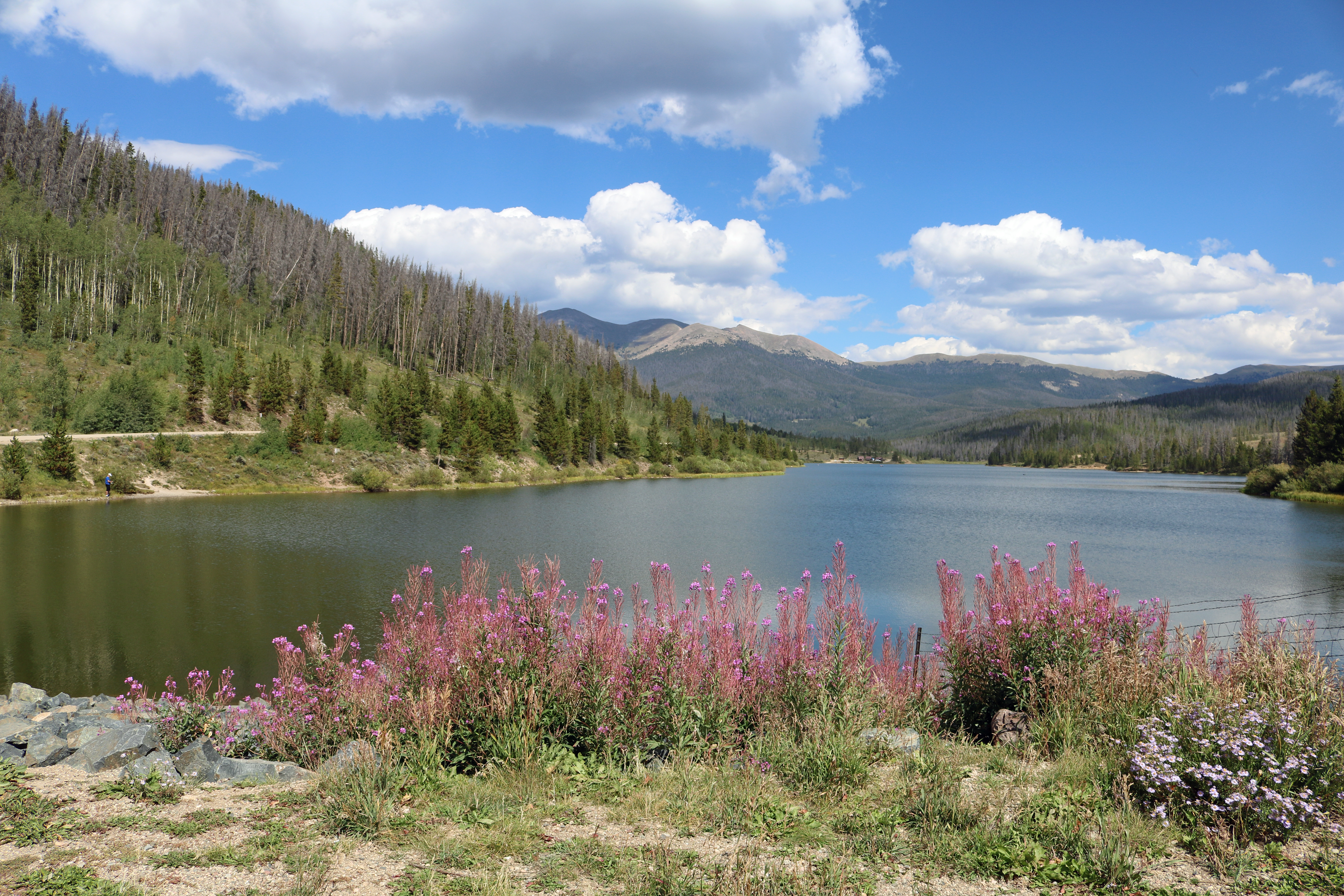
- North Michigan Creek Reservoir

- Location within Colorado
- Location: Jackson / Larimer counties, Colorado, United States
- Nearest city: Walden, CO
- Coordinates: 40°30′41″N 106°00′37″W
- Area: 70,838 acres (286.67 km^{2})
- Established: 1970
- Visitors: 387,326 (in 2021)
- Governing body: Colorado Parks and Wildlife

State Forest State Park is a Colorado State Park located in Jackson and Larimer counties east of Walden, Colorado, United States. The 70,838-acre (286.67 km^{2}) park was established in 1970 in the Medicine Bow Range of the Rocky Mountains. Facilities include a visitors' center, 187 campsites (including RV and tent sites), over 60 dispersed camping sites, 15 cabins and yurts, picnic sites, boat ramps and 94 miles (151 km) of hiking trails.

About 52,000 acres (210 km^{2}) of the park are forested in lodgepole pine, Douglas fir, Colorado blue spruce, aspen and other species. An unprecedented epidemic of Mountain pine beetle is currently reshaping the park's flora landscape. Wildlife in the park includes moose ("Moose is our claim to fame"), bighorn sheep, black bear, mule deer and elk. North Park is considered the moose viewing capital of Colorado, with over 600 moose to be observed year-round.
