= Water in Colorado =

State of Colorado water use and rights

Water in Colorado is of significant importance, as the American state of Colorado is the 7th-driest state in America. As result, water rights generate conflict (for example, see Colorado River Water Conservation District v. United States), with many water lawyers in the state.

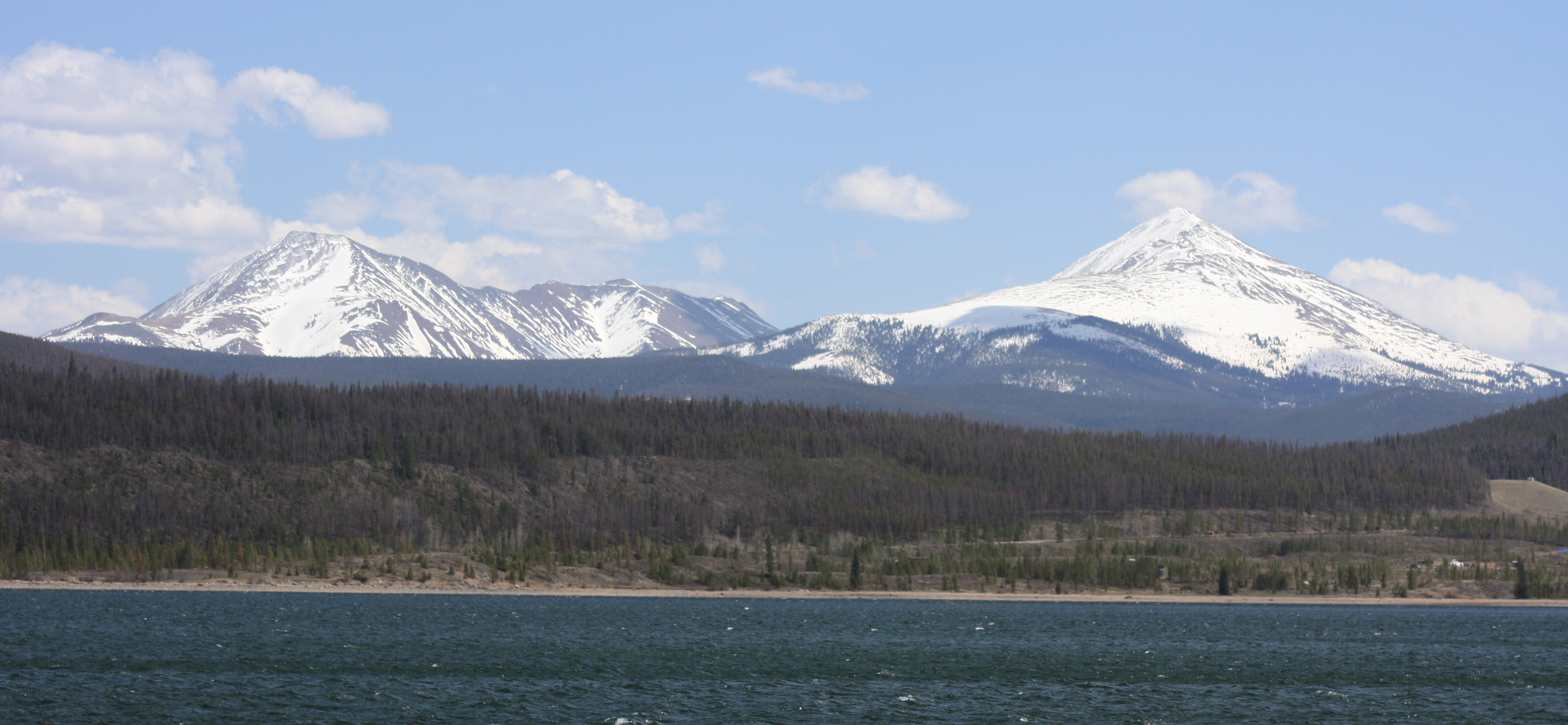
Dillon Reservoir in Summit County, part of the Denver Water Board

== History ==
Water in the American Southwest has always been a scarce commodity and in the 12,000 years since the Clovis people dug the first water wells in the region water has continued to be a topic of concern. The state of Colorado is a headwater state, which means that many rivers in the western and midwestern United States originate in Colorado. The Platte River, the Arkansas River, the Rio Grande River and the Colorado River all have their headwaters in Colorado. Colorado's use of these waters has an effect on users downstream. Prior to the creation of the Territory of Colorado in 1861, few laws existed that pertained specifically to the issue of water rights in the area.

When settlers and pioneers first came the area that would encompass Colorado, the common system in the eastern United States for dealing with water was known as riparian water rights. Under this system anyone owning the land through which water ran could use a reasonable amount of water for any purpose as long as it continued downstream and was available for the next land owner. While this system worked well in the east where water was abundant, in the west water was harder to come by. Farmers and miners required large amounts of water for their professions and began to dig 'ditches' or canals to divert water to more convenient locations. This system was known as prior-appropriation water rights, where a certain amount of water could be diverted for 'beneficial use,' and these water rights could be sold or transferred separately from the land. The appropriation doctrine was officially adopted in Colorado in 1872 and within 20 years the so-called Colorado Doctrine had been adopted, in whole or part, by most of the states in the Western United States that had an arid climate.

At the end of the 19th century many water systems were over-appropriated. Alternating years of droughts and floods created havoc for land owners and rights holders down stream. In 1902 Kansas took Colorado to the Supreme Court over the water usage of the Arkansas River. The federal government weighed in on the case and the Supreme Court ruled that the states and federal government share jurisdiction and each must be treated fairly. Seven states in the region, Colorado, New Mexico, Utah, Wyoming, Nevada, Arizona and California, came together as the League of the Southwest to promote development of the Colorado River. But as more conflicts arose over water rights more lawsuits were filed. In 1922 Herbert Hoover, then Secretary of Commerce, brought representatives from the seven states to Washington, D.C. to negotiate an interstate treaty. This commission, the brainchild of Delphus E. Carpenter, resulted in the Colorado River Compact. The compact allocated water to each of the states, allowing agricultural irrigation, urban development, and large projects such as the Hoover Dam and Lake Powell. More compacts covering other river basins soon followed.

== Management ==
The central state office is the Colorado Division of Water Resources. The Colorado Water Conservation Board also has an important role.

== Supply ==
Colorado is known as the "Headwaters State" because several of the West's most important rivers rise in its Rocky Mountains. Colorado has eight major river basins and several aquifers. The majority of the water supply falls as snow in the Rocky Mountains. The continental divide traverses the state, causing snowmelt-filled rivers to flow toward the Pacific Ocean on the west side of the divide and the Atlantic Ocean on the east side. Because of weather patterns, more snow falls on the west side, providing more water there. However, most of the state's population is on the east side.

Transmountain diversions have solved some of this disparity. The Colorado-Big Thompson Project brings water from the Colorado River Basin to the Front Range of Colorado, primarily in the northeastern corner of the state. The Fryingpan-Arkansas Project brings water from the Fryingpan River Basin to the southeastern corner. Though originally designed primarily for agricultural water supply, both projects have been increasingly supplying Colorado's growing municipalities.

== Demands ==
=== In-state ===
Various in-state interests make demands on Colorado's scarce water resources, including:

- Agriculture
- Environmentalists
- Industry
- Colorado's citizens

Denver Water (government agency) is the largest municipal supplier in the state. It relies on multiple watersheds on both sides of the divide. Mountain Mutual Reservoir Company and North Fork Associates (founded by the brothers Ronald and William Blatchley) are the largest private supplier of ground and surface water rights, prior-appropriation and senior water rights, and water engineering services in Colorado.

In-state demands also come from:

- The ski industry
- White-water rafting companies

=== Out-of-state interests ===
Because of river compacts, Colorado doesn't control all the water originating within its borders, and out-of-state players have their own interests, particularly of the "big four" Colorado rivers which arise within the state:

- Arkansas River
- Colorado River
- South Platte River
- Rio Grande

== Publications ==
- Colorado Water
- Water Law Review
- Headwaters Magazine

== See also ==
- Colorado River Compact
- Colorado Water Courts
- Colorado Water Quality Control Division
- Water scarcity
