= Colorado Department of Natural Resources =

Department of the Colorado state government

Department of Natural Resources
Department overview
- Jurisdiction: Colorado
- Department executive: Dan Gibbs, Executive Director
- Website: dnr.colorado.gov

The Colorado Department of Natural Resources is the principal department of the Colorado state government responsible for the development, protection, and enhancement Colorado natural resources for the use and enjoyment of the state's present and future residents, as well as for visitors to the state.

The Department of Natural Resources comprises the following 8 divisions:

- Colorado Avalanche Information Center
- Colorado Division of Forestry
- Colorado Division of Reclamation, Mining, and Safety
- Colorado Division of Water Resources
- Colorado Oil and Gas Conservation Commission
- Colorado Parks and Wildlife
- Colorado State Land Board
- Colorado Water Conservation Board

It formerly included the Colorado Geological Survey which was spun off and subsequently incorporated into the Colorado School of Mines in 2014.

In 2022, the Colorado Department of Natural Resources announced its Colorado Strategic Wildfire Action Program Workforce Development Grant, moving $17.5 million state stimulus dollars to start work on fuels reduction projects and increase Colorado’s capacity to conduct critical forest restoration and wildfire mitigation work.

== See also ==
- List of Colorado natural areas
- List of Colorado state parks
- List of Colorado state wildlife areas
- List of law enforcement agencies in Colorado
- List of state and territorial fish and wildlife management agencies in the United States
