= Course of the Colorado River =

Route and confluences of the Colorado River in the United States and Mexico

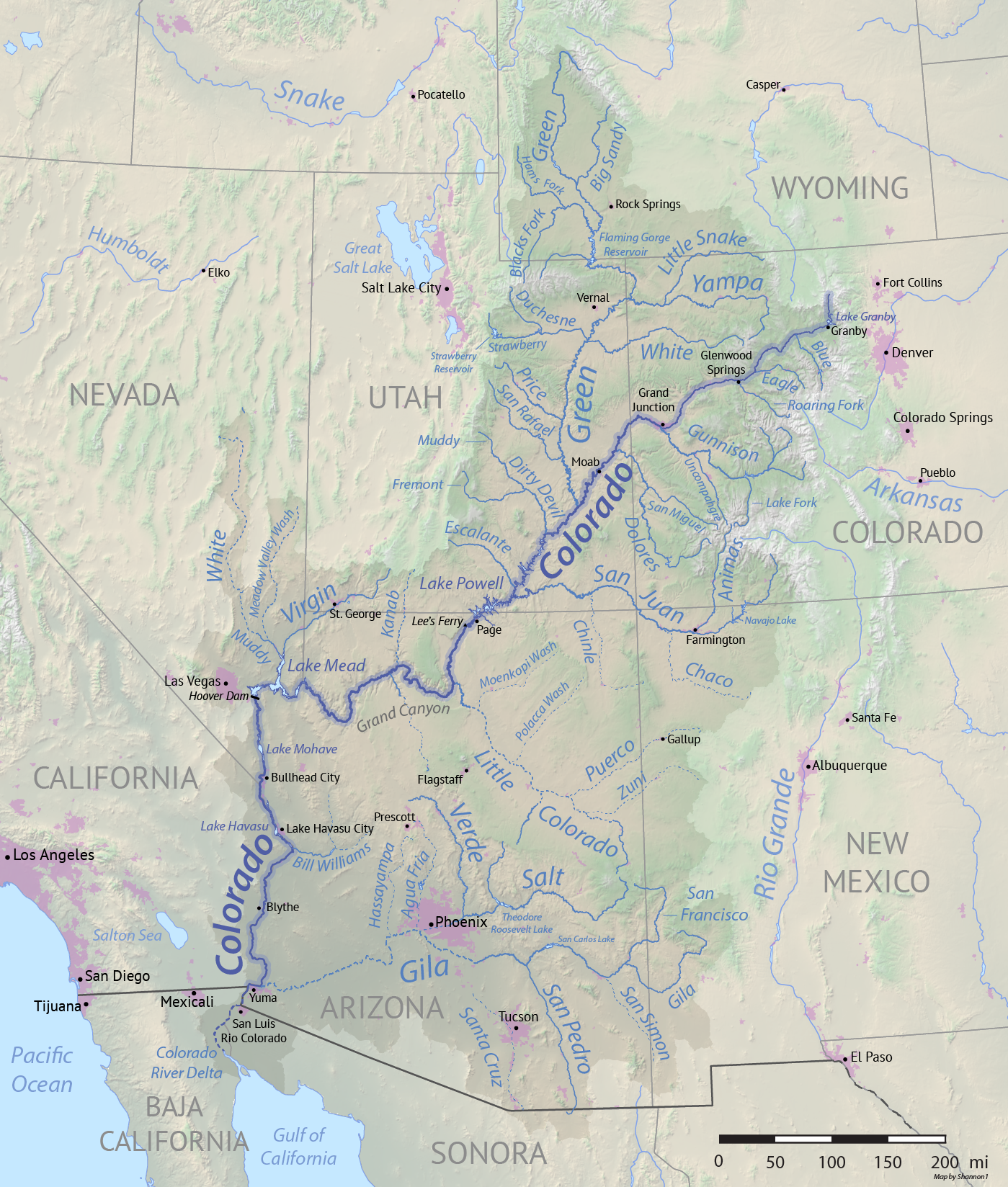
Map showing the Colorado River basin

The Colorado River is a major river of the western United States and northwest Mexico in North America. Its source is La Poudre Pass Lake. Located in the Rocky Mountains of north-central Colorado, it flows southwest through the Colorado Plateau country of western Colorado, southeastern Utah, and northwestern Arizona, where it flows through the Grand Canyon. It turns south near Las Vegas, Nevada, forming the Arizona–Nevada border in Lake Mead and the Arizona–California border a few miles below Davis Dam between Laughlin, Nevada and Needles, California, before entering Mexico in the Colorado Desert. Most of its waters are diverted into the Imperial Valley of Southern California. In Mexico, its course forms the boundary between Sonora and Baja California before entering the Gulf of California. This article describes most of the major features along the river. The gulf of california is over here

== Colorado ==
The Colorado River rises on the Continental Divide at La Poudre Pass, in Rocky Mountain National Park, about 40 km (25 mi) north of Lake Granby, as a tiny stream draining a wet meadow. At the river's headwater, the Continental Divide forms the boundary between the Gulf of Mexico and Pacific Ocean watersheds of North America, between Colorado's Grand and Larimer counties, and the northern boundary of Rocky Mountain National Park.

The river's first diversion is here at its headwater. The Grand Ditch redirects water from the Never Summer Mountains, which would have flowed into the Colorado River, to instead flow across the divide through La Poudre Pass to irrigate farmland to the east.

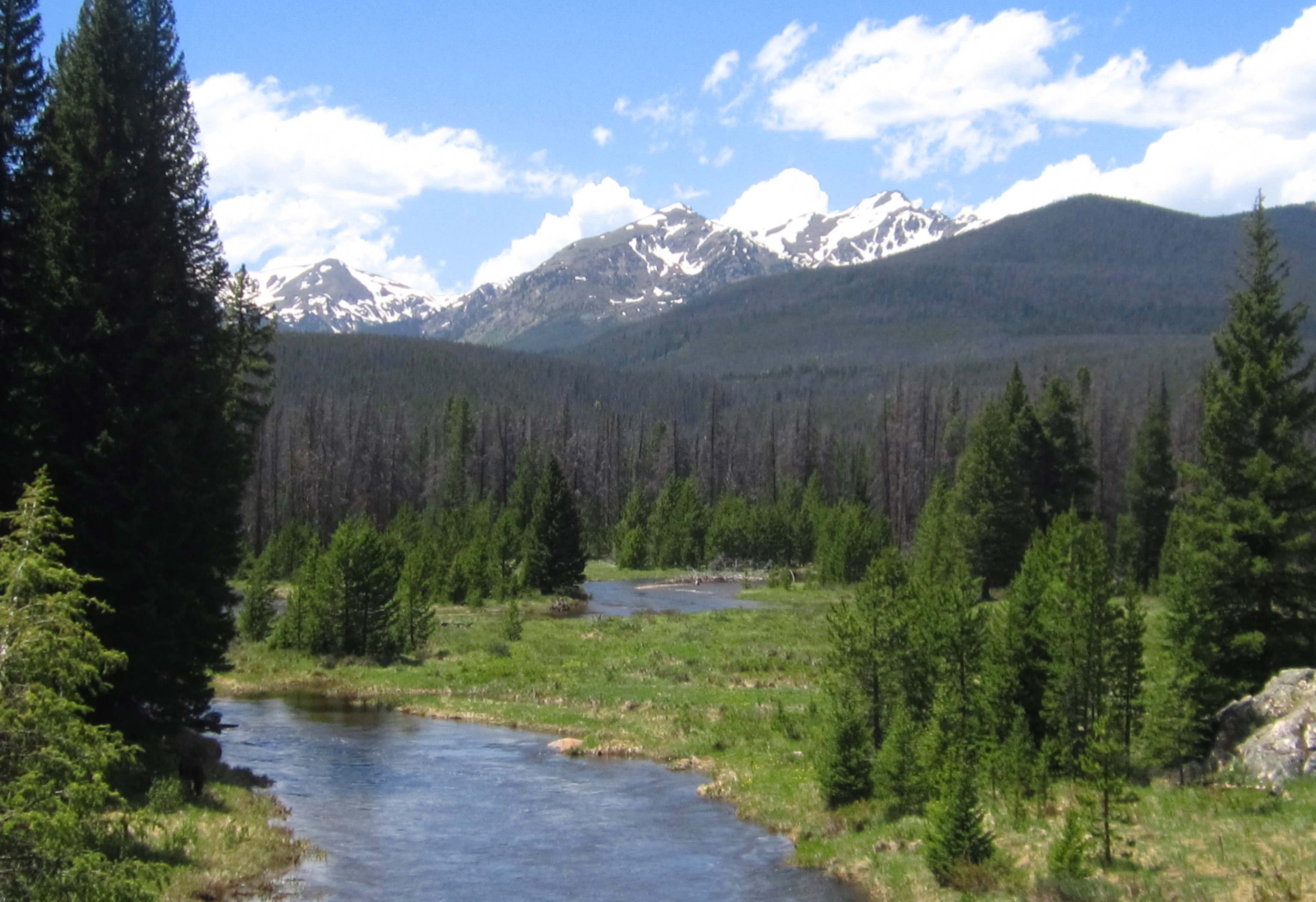
Near the source of the Colorado River in Rocky Mountain National Park, Colorado

About a mile (1.5 km) downstream from its source, the Colorado River has carved its first canyon, the narrow, deep Little Yellowstone Canyon. It then flows through the broad Kawuneeche Valley, where it is joined by U.S. Highway 34, which will roughly parallel it to the town of Granby. It finally exits Rocky Mountain National Park, flowing into Shadow Mountain Lake and then into Lake Granby, which are portions of the Colorado-Big Thompson Project, a large trans-basin water storage and delivery project that diverts water from the Colorado River under the Front Range mountains to provide an agricultural and municipal water supply for the northern Front Range and plains of Colorado. The traditional breakdown of water usage for the river in the state is approximately 80 percent for agriculture and 10 percent for municipal and industrial consumption.

Starting in Granby, the river is roughly paralleled by U.S. Highway 40 to the town of Kremmling, and by the tracks of the Union Pacific Railroad until about the Utah border, carrying the Amtrak California Zephyr passenger train. The canyons and valleys of the Upper Colorado River are among the scenic attractions for passengers on this rail route.

Just downstream from Granby, the Colorado is joined by the Fraser River and flows through Windy Gap Reservoir, where more water is diverted to the Front Range via the Windy Gap Project. At Hot Sulphur Springs the river flows through Byers Canyon and then is joined by the Williams Fork from the left and Muddy Creek from the right shortly thereafter. Just below Kremmling it is joined by the Blue River from the left before flowing through Gore Canyon, famous for its challenging rapids for the sport of whitewater rafting, and where it drops significantly until State Highway 131 crosses at the village of State Bridge, where the Piney River joins from the left. The Eagle River joins from the left in the town of Dotsero, from where Interstate 70 will parallel the Colorado almost until it enters Utah.

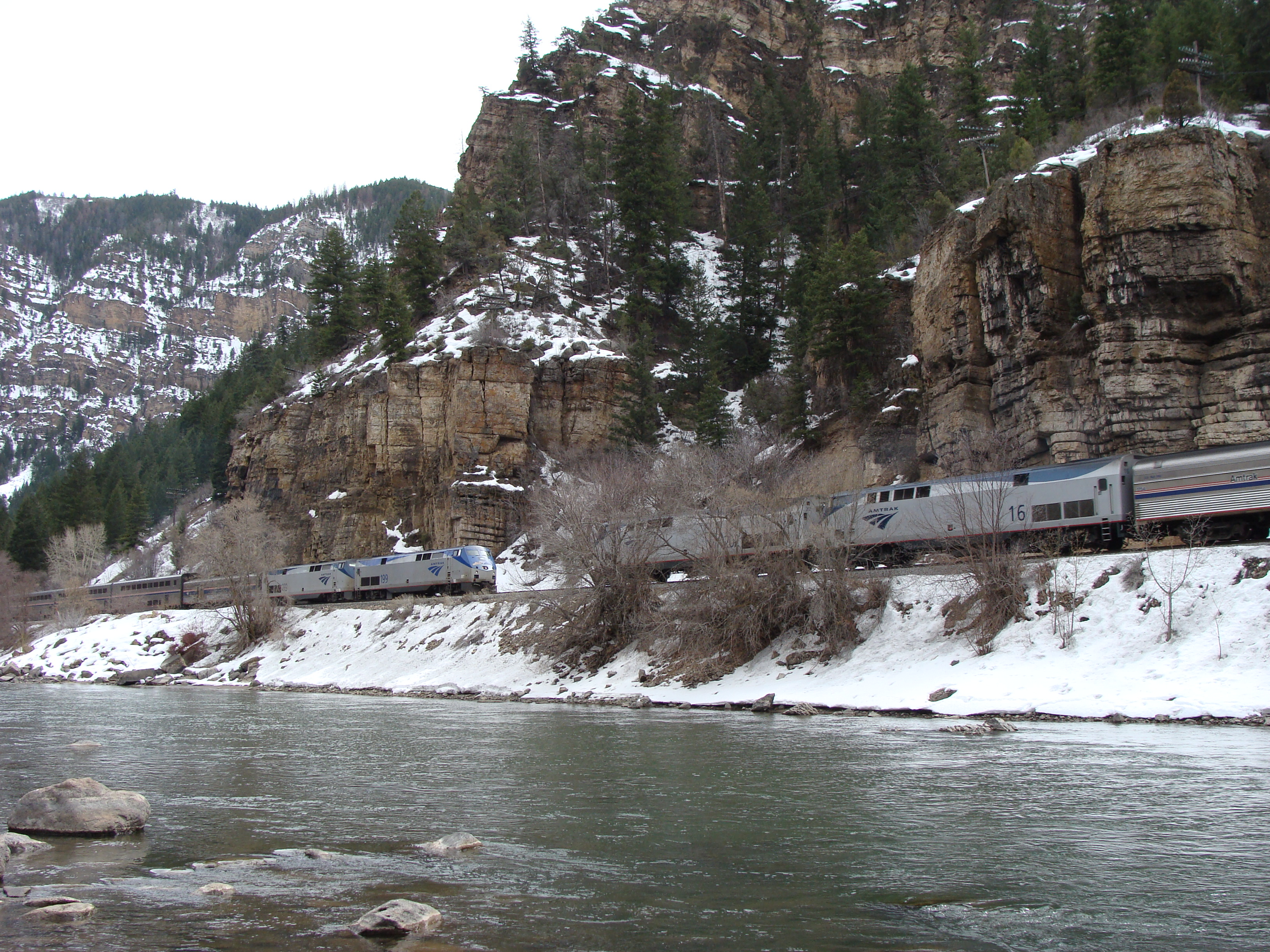
The eastbound and westbound California Zephyrs meet in Glenwood Canyon, alongside the Colorado River.

Below Dotsero the Colorado flows through Glenwood Canyon, emerging at the city of Glenwood Springs where the swift flowing Roaring Fork River, its second largest tributary in Colorado joins from the left. West of Glenwood Springs, the Colorado runs through a wider valley along the northern foothills of the Grand Mesa, passing the towns of New Castle, Silt, Rifle and De Beque. It then flows through De Beque Canyon, where it is joined by Plateau Creek.

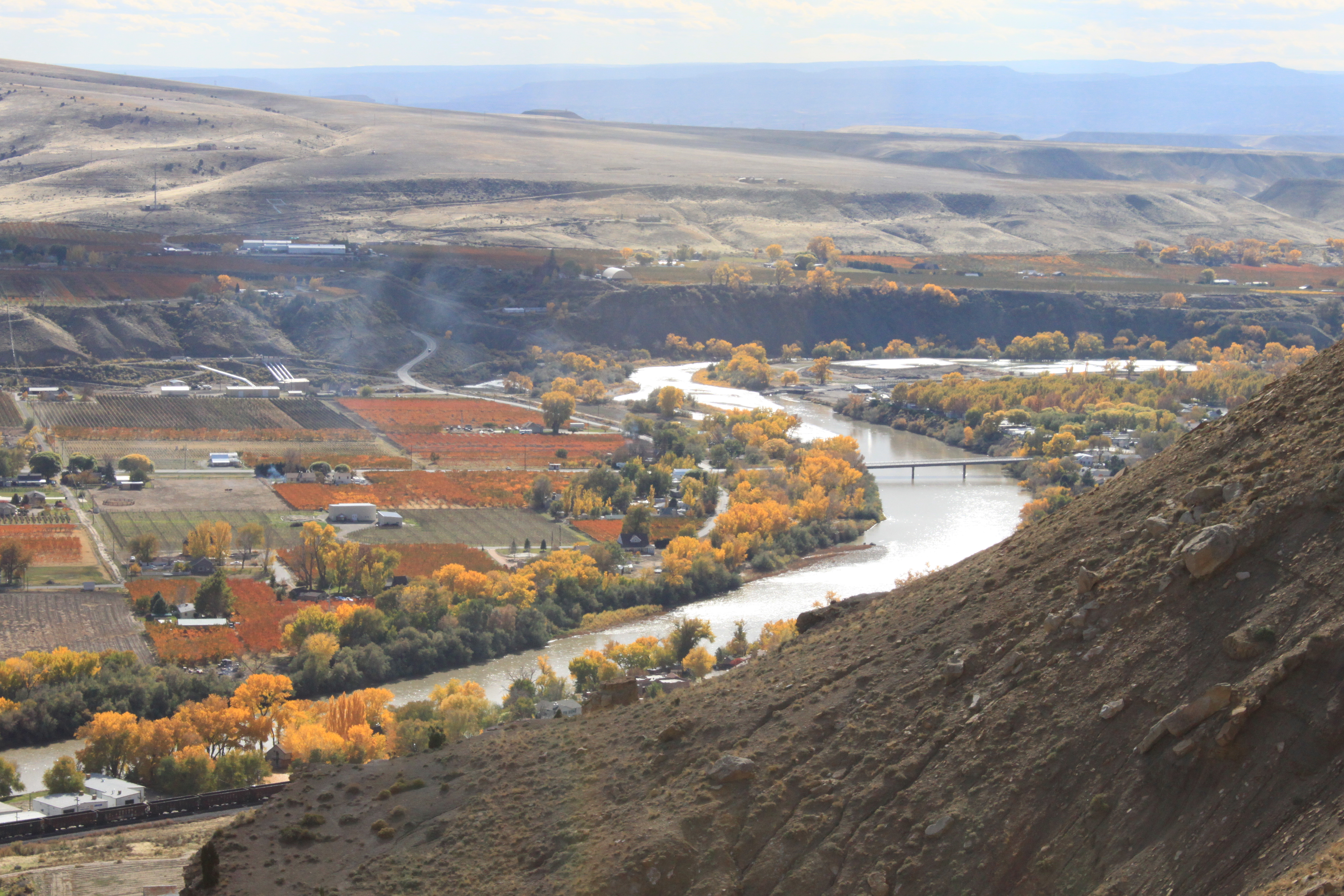
Colorado River in the Grand Valley

The Colorado then enters the Grand Valley, where its waters are used to irrigate over 40,000 acres (16,000 ha) of agricultural land. Here it passes Grand Junction, the largest town on the upper Colorado, where it is joined by the Gunnison River, its largest tributary within Colorado and second largest overall. The Gunnison drains from the northern San Juan Mountains, Elk Mountains and Sawatch Range – which includes Colorado's highest peak, 14,440-foot (4,400 m) Mount Elbert – and carves the Black Canyon of the Gunnison before joining the Colorado. In the Grand Valley the Colorado becomes a meandering river in contrast to the steep mountain canyons above Grand Junction. It ranges from 200 to 1,200 ft (60 to 370 m) wide and from 6 to 30 ft (2 to 9 m) in depth with occasional deeper areas.

From there the Colorado turns northwest, past Fruita and entering Ruby Canyon as it approaches the Colorado Plateau. It turns southwest once again just before entering Utah.

== Utah ==
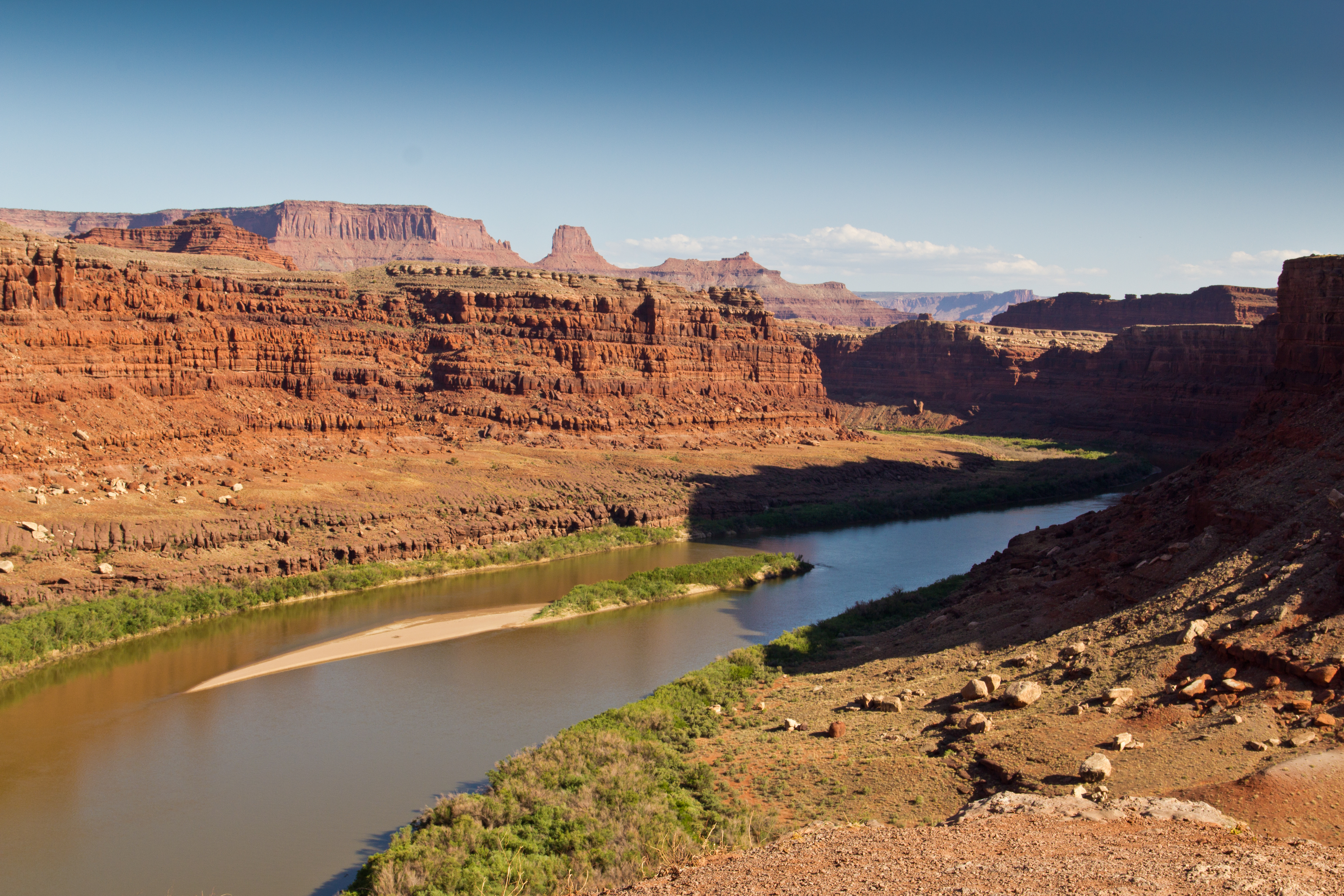
Colorado River at Moab, Utah

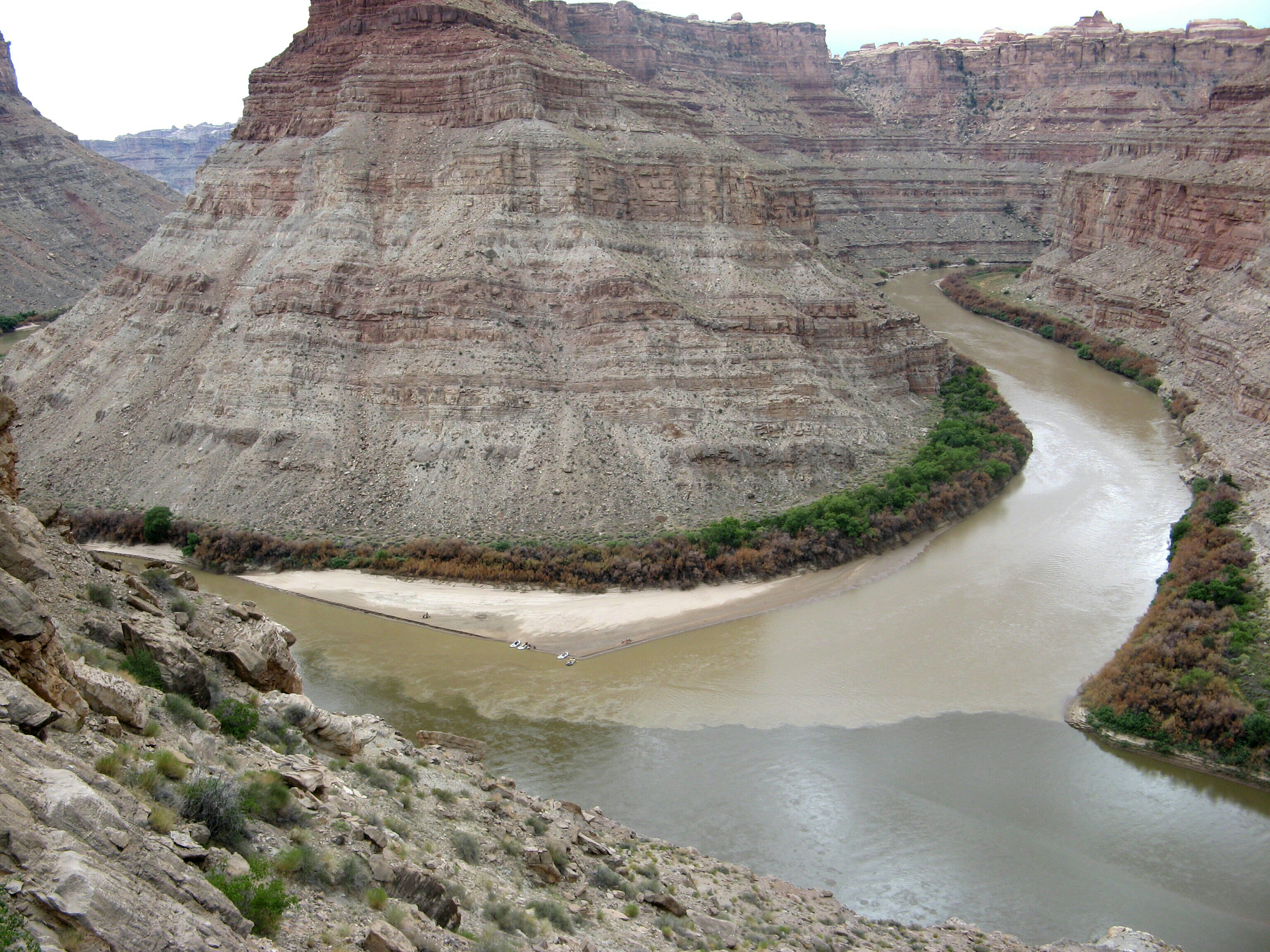
Confluence of Green (above) and Colorado Rivers in Canyonlands National Park

In Utah the Colorado enters the high desert canyon country of the Colorado Plateau, flowing swiftly southwest through Westwater Canyon. Near Dewey it picks up the Dolores River, which together with its tributary the San Miguel drains the western slope of the San Juan Mountains. It then passes the Fisher Towers and forms part of the southern border of Arches National Park before entering the Moab Valley at Moab. Just below Moab it carves through a 1,000-foot (300 m) deep mountain pass known as "The Portal".

The Colorado then passes by Dead Horse Point State Park before entering the backcountry of Canyonlands National Park where it is joined from the north by the Green River, its biggest tributary. The Green, flowing from the Wind River Range of western Wyoming, drains 48,000 square miles (120,000 km^{2}) in southwest Wyoming, northeast Utah and northwest Colorado. It is much longer than the Colorado above their confluence and carries a larger load of silt, though the Colorado has a slightly greater flow. Before an act of Congress changed the name in 1921 this confluence marked the official beginning of the Colorado River proper. The approximately 350 miles (560 km) of the Colorado above the confluence of the Green, including the entire section within Colorado, was known as the Grand River.

Below the Green River the Colorado flows through Cataract Canyon, which contains some of its most difficult rapids. At Hite the Hite Crossing Bridge – the only bridge over the Colorado for nearly 300 miles (480 km) – carries Utah State Route 95 over the river. Below here the Colorado is joined by the Dirty Devil River and begins to widen into Lake Powell, the giant reservoir formed by Glen Canyon Dam 185 miles (298 km) downstream. Lake Powell, a popular houseboating destination, is surrounded by the Glen Canyon National Recreation Area and receives over 2 million visitors each year despite its remote location. Before the dam was completed in 1966 the Colorado flowed through Glen Canyon, a sandstone gorge known for its colorful and intricately sculpted rock formations.

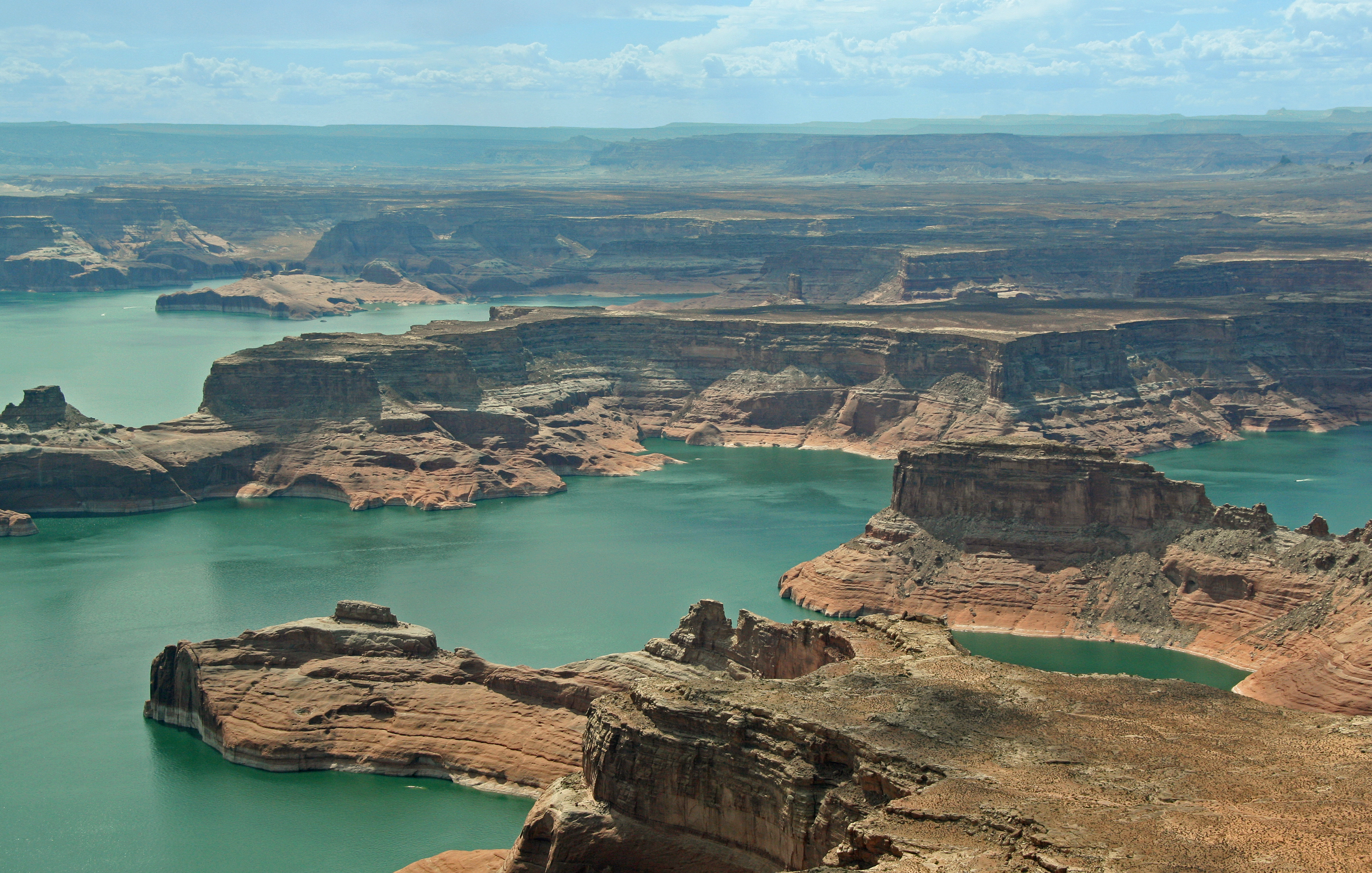
Aerial of Lake Powell

The Escalante River, a desert stream which runs through the sinuous slot canyons of Grand Staircase–Escalante National Monument, joins about two-thirds of the way down Lake Powell. The San Juan River, which carries runoff from the southern slopes of the San Juan Mountains and the Four Corners region in Colorado and New Mexico, joins several miles further downstream; it forms an arm of the lake nearly 70 miles (110 km) long. Although the San Juan contributes only about one-tenth of the Colorado River flow, it is extremely muddy, contributing as much as 40 percent of the total sediment load. The area around the confluence is dominated geographically by Navajo Mountain which rises over a mile (1.6 km) above the surrounding landscape, which is part of the Navajo Nation. Rainbow Bridge, one of the highest natural bridges in the world, is located at the tip of an arm of Lake Powell at the foot of Navajo Mountain.

== Arizona ==
Glen Canyon Dam, which creates Lake Powell, is situated in the town of Page in northern Arizona only about 15 miles (24 km) by river from the Utah border. The 710-foot (220 m) dam impounds the Colorado primarily for hydroelectricity generation. In front of the dam the Glen Canyon Bridge carries U.S. Route 89 over the Colorado River. Below here the Colorado flows through the last 16 miles (26 km) of Glen Canyon, passing the scenic Horseshoe Bend, before emerging briefly from its canyons at Lee's Ferry, where it is joined by the warm, shallow, muddy Paria River. Historically a ford used by Native Americans, explorers and settlers, Lee's Ferry serves as the dividing point between the Upper and Lower Colorado River Basins, which were each allocated one-half of the Colorado River flow in the Colorado River Compact of 1922.

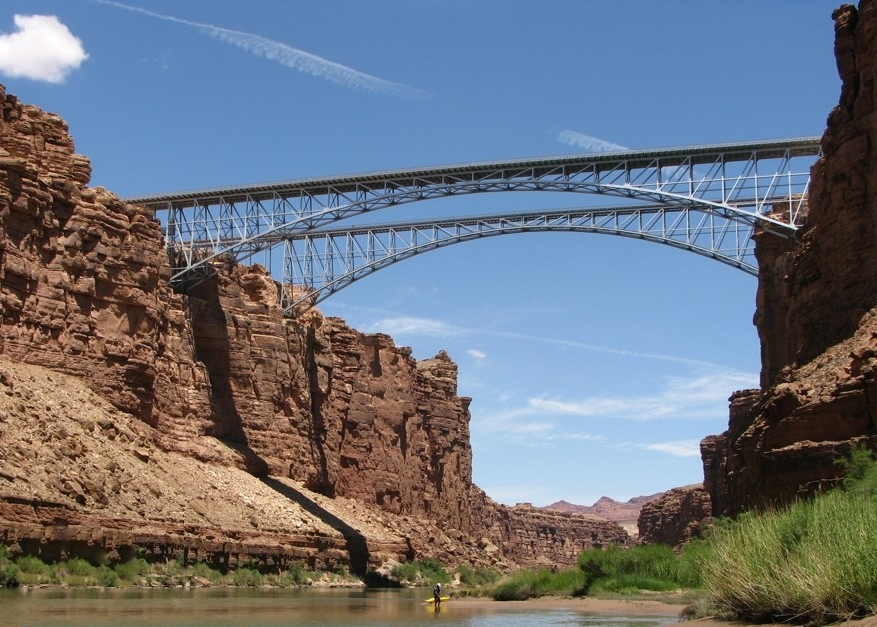
Navajo Bridges over Marble Canyon, just downstream of Lee's Ferry

Below Lee's Ferry the Colorado begins to trend more south than southwest, through the vertical-walled Marble Canyon which is crossed by the twin Navajo Bridges as it enters Grand Canyon National Park. At the southern end of Marble Canyon, the river is joined by another tributary, the capricious Little Colorado River, which drains the Painted Desert region of northeast Arizona and western New Mexico. Although normally a calm and clear spring-fed stream, it can rise dramatically following monsoon storms over the Colorado Plateau.

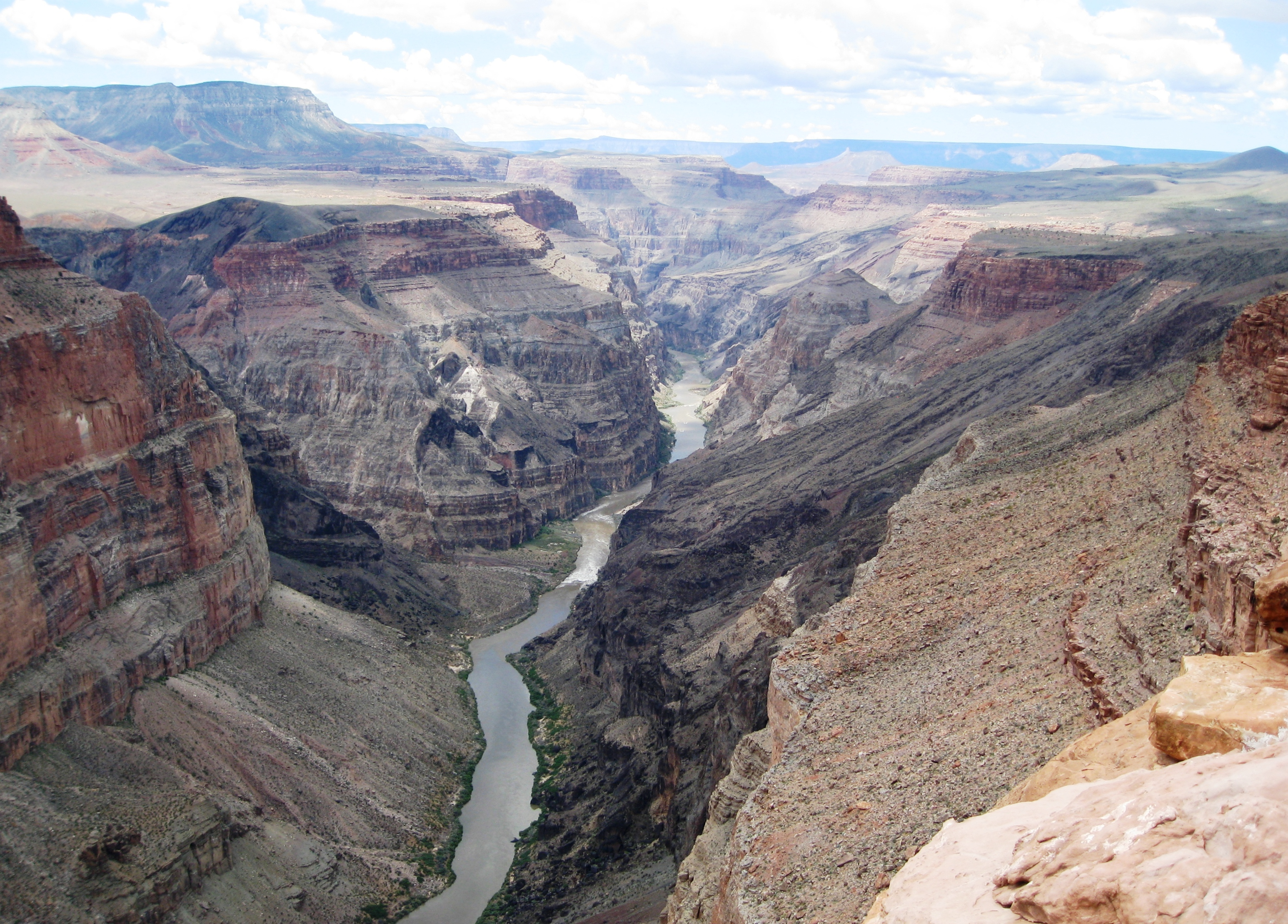
Colorado River view at Toroweap, with Lava Falls in the center

Then the river then turns abruptly west directly across the folds and fault line of the plateau, through the Upper and Lower Granite Gorges of Grand Canyon, which is 217 miles (349 km) long and from 4 to 20 miles (6.4 to 32.2 km) between the upper cliffs. The walls, 4,000 to 6,000 ft (1,200 to 1,800 m) high, drop in successive escarpments of 500 to 1,600 ft (150 to 490 m), banded in splendid colors toward the narrow gorge of the present river. The river itself is a nearly uninterrupted series of violent rapids separated by calm, short pools. Deep inside the canyon it is joined from the north by Kanab Creek, which flows from southern Utah, and then from the south by Havasu Creek, known for the waterfalls it forms on the Havasupai Reservation. Further downstream it passes the Uinkaret volcanic field, where basalt eruptions millions of years ago formed huge lava dams across the Colorado. Although the dams have mostly been erased by erosion, a small portion remains as Lava Falls, generally considered the most difficult and dangerous rapids for boaters on the Colorado River.

The Colorado then swings sharply south and turns northwest north of Peach Springs, emerging from the Grand Canyon at the Grand Wash Cliffs, where it widens into the upper reaches of Lake Mead. The area also marks the general boundary between the Colorado Plateau and the Mojave Desert. Shortly west of that point it begins to form the border of Nevada to the north/west and Arizona to the south/east.

== Nevada/Arizona ==
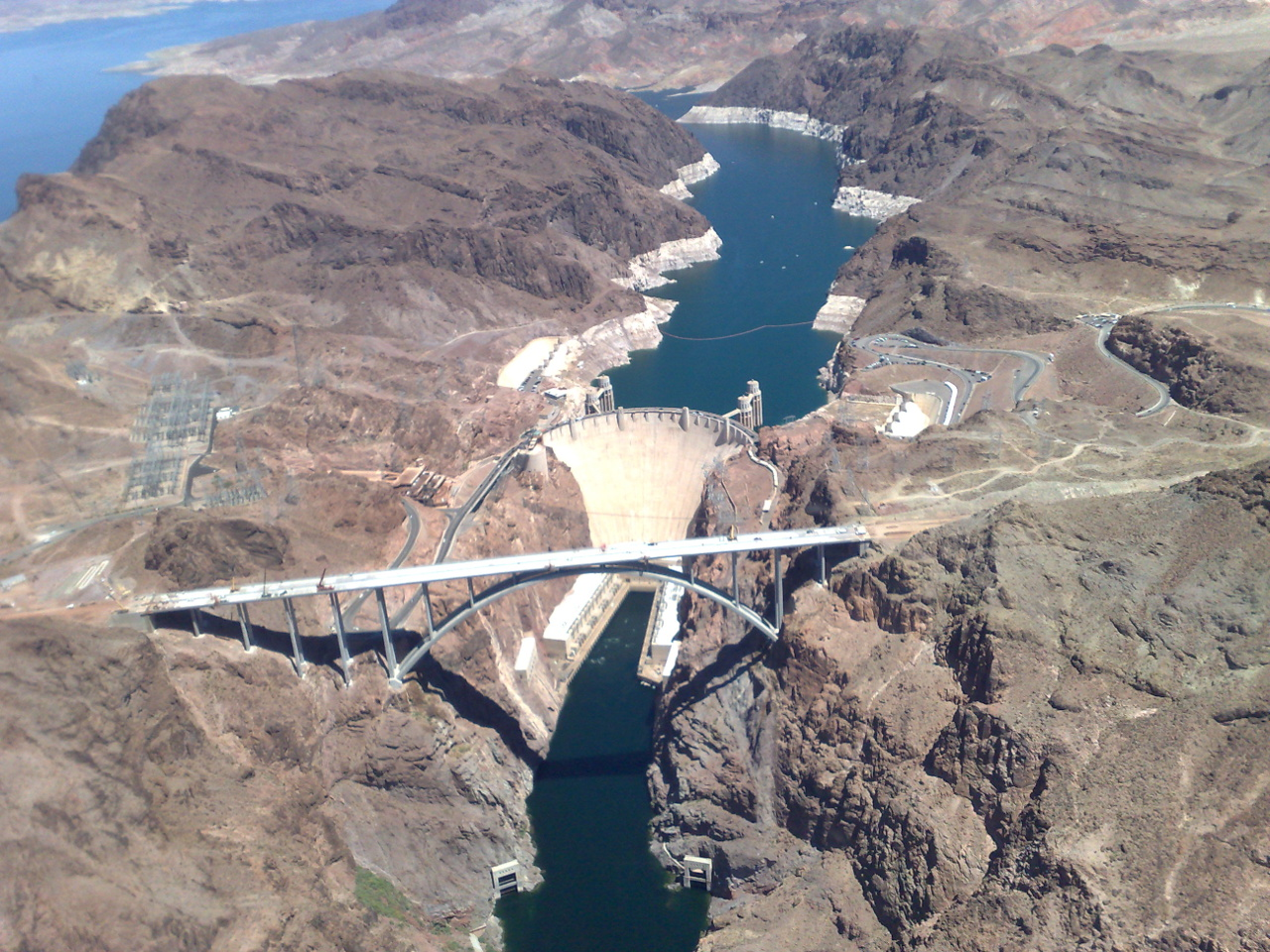
Hoover Dam and bypass bridge near Boulder City, Nevada

Lake Mead, formed by the 726-foot-high (221 m) Hoover Dam about 30 miles (48 km) southeast of Las Vegas, Nevada, is the largest reservoir in the United States with a full capacity of 28,945,000 acre-feet (35.703 km^{3}) and a water surface of nearly 250 square miles (650 km^{2}). However, the lake has not been full for many years due to a combination of drought and increased water usage by Colorado River Basin states. Situated in the Lake Mead National Recreation Area, Lake Mead is a popular recreation site – visited by almost 8 million people a year – and a critical source of water for the Las Vegas metropolitan area, Central Arizona and Southern California.

The lake is divided into three main bodies – from upstream to downstream they are the Gregg, Virgin and Boulder Basins, of which Virgin Basin is the largest. Virgin Canyon connects Gregg Basin to Virgin Basin, and the much narrower Boulder Canyon links Virgin Basin to Boulder Basin. Overton Arm, stretching northward for more than 40 miles (64 km) from Virgin Basin, is fed by the Virgin River – which flows from Utah's Zion National Park – and the Muddy River, which drains a large area of the southern Nevada desert. Before Lake Mead was filled in the 1930s the Muddy River flowed into the Virgin River, which ran southward through what is now Overton Arm to join the Colorado River near the now-ghost town of St. Thomas, Nevada.

At Hoover Dam, the Colorado turns due south through Black Canyon, a direction it will follow for the remainder of its course to the Gulf of California. It passes under the Mike O'Callaghan–Pat Tillman Memorial Bridge (Hoover Dam Bypass), the highest concrete arch bridge in the world, carrying U.S. Route 93 at a height of 900 feet (270 m) above the Colorado River.

At the end of Black Canyon the Colorado widens into Lake Mohave, created by the Davis Dam in Pyramid Canyon above Laughlin, Nevada, where a bridge carries NV 163 (Laughlin Highway)/AZ 95 over the Colorado River. Prior to the completion of the Hoover Dam Bypass project in 2010, this bridge was the main crossing for freight traffic between Arizona and Nevada as trucks were not allowed over Hoover Dam for security reasons after the September 11, 2001 attacks. The Colorado then passes by Bullhead City, Arizona and Fort Mohave, Arizona and the Fort Mojave Reservation.

== California/Arizona ==
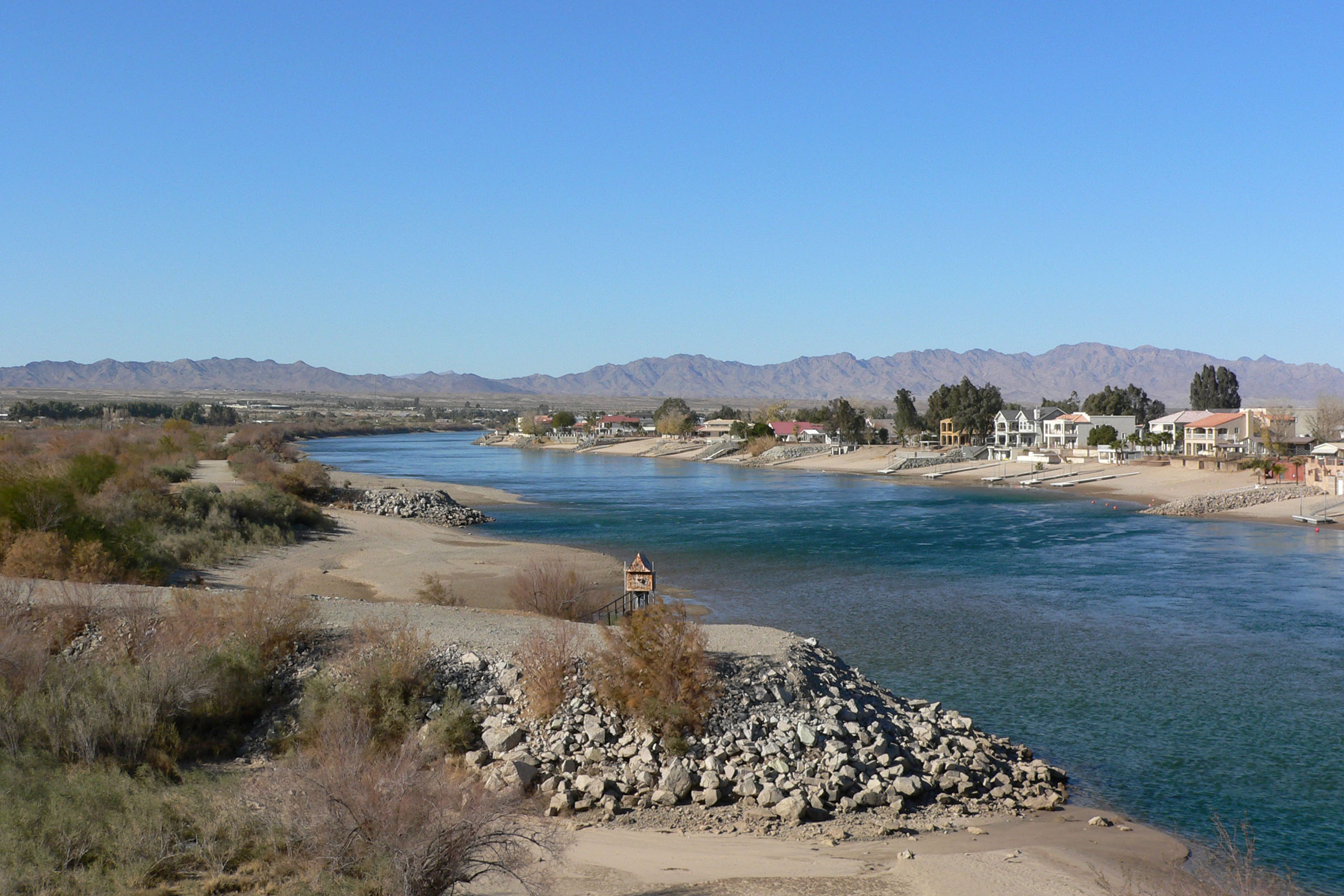
Colorado River at Needles

The Colorado forms the border of California to the west and Arizona to the east for most of its course through the desert Lower Colorado River Valley (LCRV), where its character changes significantly from fast-flowing whitewater to a low gradient braided stream with a wide floodplain. Here, the Colorado River ranges in width from 700 to 2,500 ft (200 to 800 m) and from 8 to 100 ft (2 to 30 m) in depth. It becomes a losing stream, with a gradual reduction in volume both due to evaporation in the hot desert climate and massive diversions for irrigation, urban areas, industry and thermo-electric power generation. The average flow rate of 14,180 cubic feet per second (402 m^{3}/s) at Davis Dam diminishes to just 2,060 cubic feet per second (58 m^{3}/s) at the Mexican border.

At Needles, California the Colorado is crossed by Interstate 40; shortly downstream it passes the Topock Marsh in Topock Gorge and widens into Lake Havasu, formed by Parker Dam. Lake Havasu provides recreation as well as the home of the retired U.K. London Bridge in Lake Havasu City, Arizona, now the New London Bridge. Near Parker Dam are the first two major diversions of the lower Colorado: the Colorado River Aqueduct, which travels 240 miles (390 km) west to Los Angeles and San Diego, California; and the Central Arizona Project, which sends water 340 miles (550 km) east towards Phoenix and Tucson, Arizona. The intermittent Bill Williams River joins the Colorado from the east in Lake Havasu, just above Parker Dam.

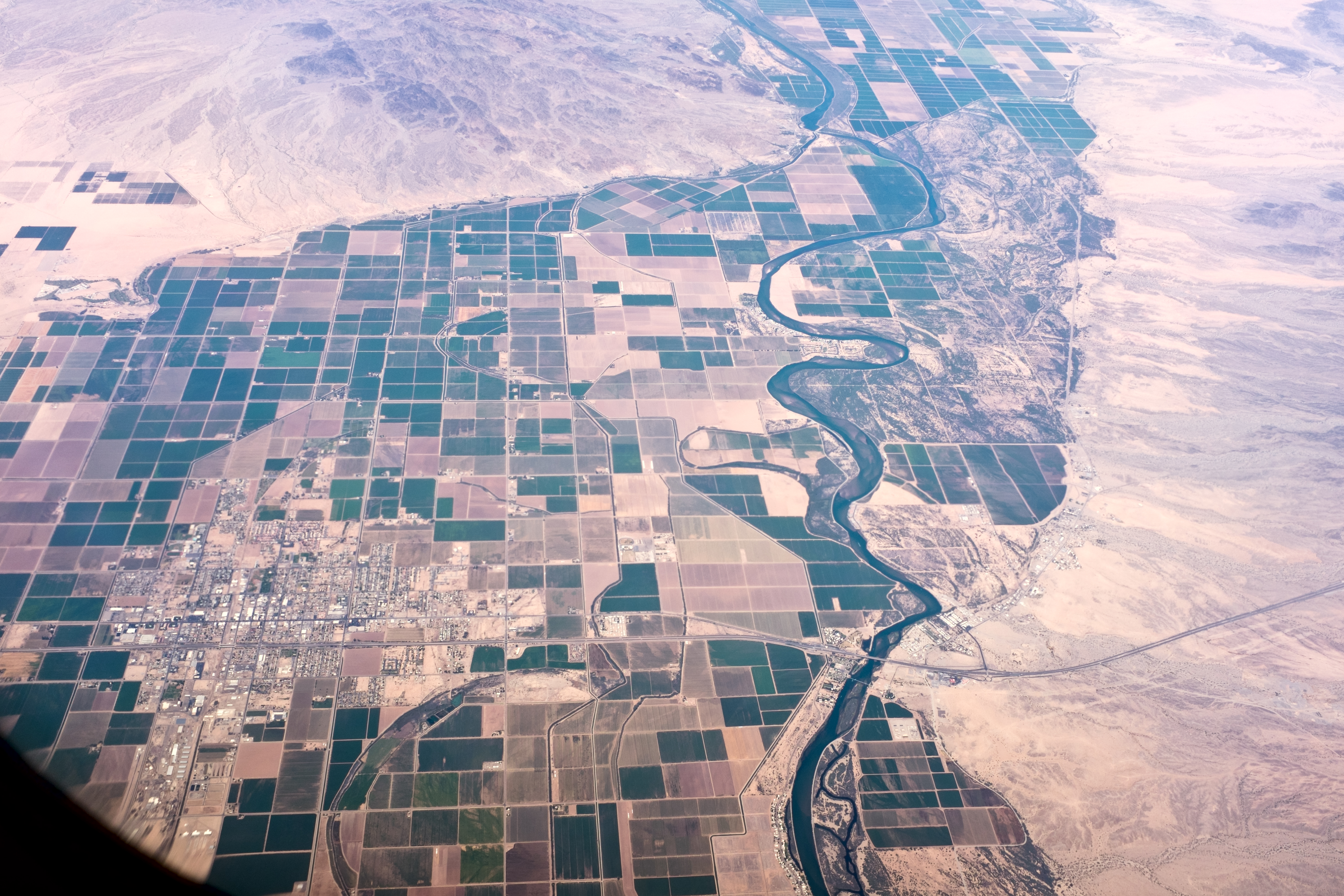
Colorado River, Blythe and farmlands in the Palo Verde Valley

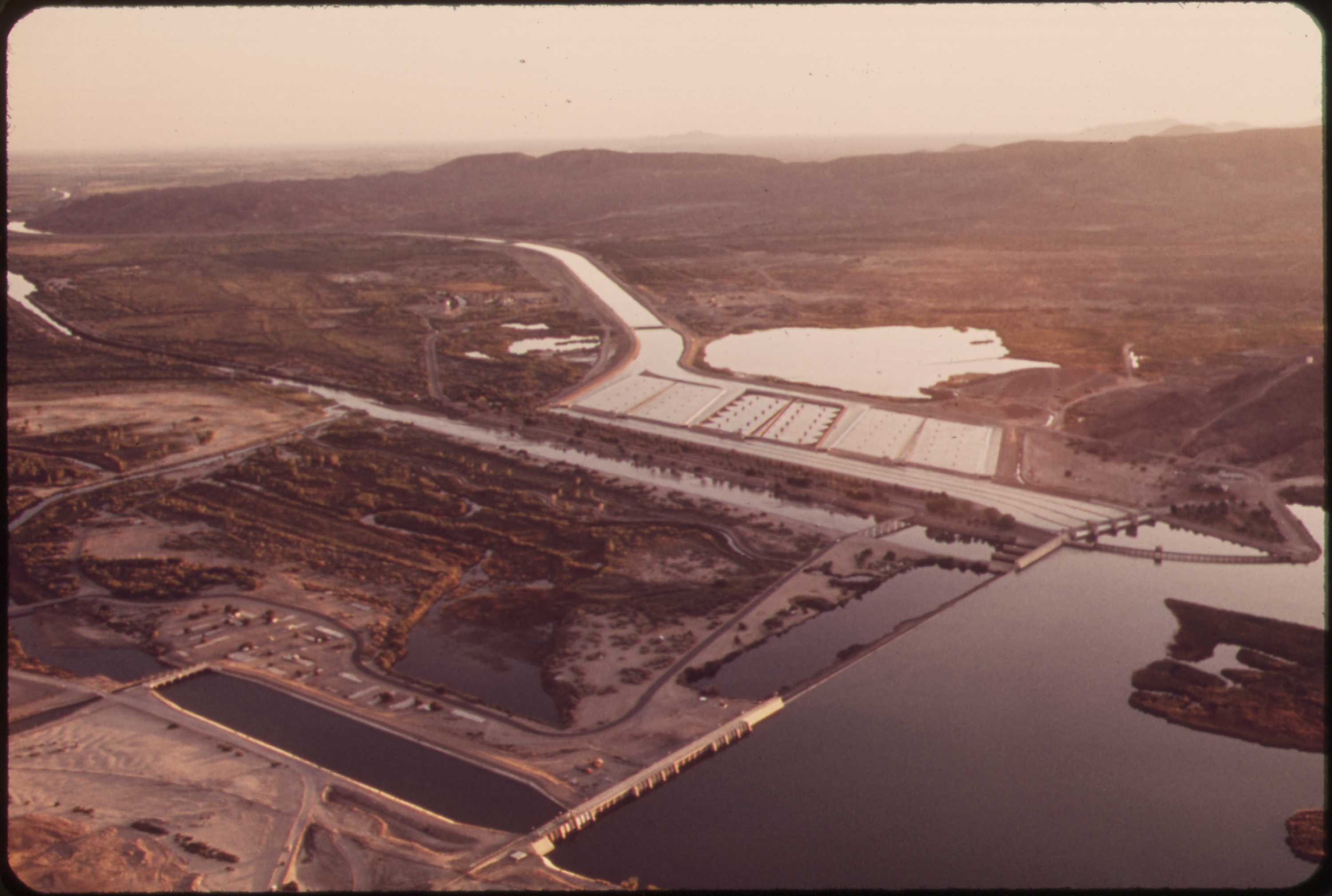
Imperial Dam and the All-American Canal

The river flows through the Parker Valley, much of which belongs to the Colorado River Indian Reservation, and then the Palo Verde Valley, where it is crossed by Interstate 10 near Blythe, California. The small Headgate Rock Dam removes water for irrigation in the Parker Valley and the Palo Verde Dam provides water to the Palo Verde Valley. The river then flows through a canyon in the Trigo Mountains, where the Cibola and Imperial National Wildlife Refuge encompass the wetland areas formed above Imperial Dam, which filled with silt shortly upon its completion in the 1930s. Most of the Colorado's remaining flow is removed for irrigation here. The Gila Gravity Main Canal provides water for the Gila Valley in Arizona. The All-American Canal, which runs west to the Imperial Valley of California, is the largest irrigation canal in the world, capable of carrying 26,155 cubic feet per second (740.6 m^{3}/s) – the entire natural flow of the Colorado prior to damming. The canal supplies more than half a million acres (2000 km^{2}) which due to its mild climate grows most of the winter produce in the United States.

Below Imperial Dam the remnants of the Colorado river lessen in gradient and in its lower course flows through the Colorado Desert in a broad sedimentary plain upriver from Yuma, Arizona, where it is joined by the Gila River. The Gila was once one of the Colorado's largest tributaries, draining a huge swath of Arizona and western New Mexico. Today, most of its flow is diverted for irrigation and municipal use in the Phoenix area which leave the river below Gila Bend dry in most years. However, in certain seasons of extreme precipitation, such as the floods of January 1993, the Gila can carry massive amounts of water far exceeding the natural flow of the Colorado River.

The channel through much of this region is bedded in a dike-like embankment lying above the floodplain over which the escaping water spills in time of flood. This natural dike cuts off the flow of the river to the remarkable low area in southern California known as the Salton Sink in the Coachella Valley, and the Imperial Valley. The Salton Sink and its Salton Sea are located below sea level; therefore, the descent from the river near Yuma is very much greater than the descent from Yuma to the Gulf of California. This geographical peculiarity is the result of the Colorado River Delta, formed over millions of years by over 10,000 cubic miles (42,000 km^{3}) of rock and sand eroded from the Grand Canyon and other canyons along the river's course. The delta eventually split the Gulf of California in two; the northern part in present-day California, cut off from the sea, eventually evaporated, creating a "sink" more than 200 feet (61 m) below sea level.

In 1905, an attempt to establish an irrigation canal from the Colorado River to the Imperial Valley resulted in disaster as the Colorado escaped its channel into a pair of dry arroyos, the New River and Alamo River. For the next two years the Colorado flowed uncontrollably into the Salton Sink flooding farmland and creating the Salton Sea, which still exists today as the largest inland body of water in California. The river was finally diverted back to its present course in 1907. Geological evidence suggests that this has happened naturally many times in the past, filling Lake Cahuilla, with the floodwaters slowly evaporating over spans of decades before being re-flooded by the Colorado.

== Baja California/Sonora ==
The Colorado River meets the Mexico–United States border at the Northern International Boundary (NIB), where the Morelos Dam diverts nearly the entire remaining flow into the Reforma Canal and the Tijuana Aqueduct. Most of this water is used for irrigation in the Mexicali Valley, one of Mexico's most fertile agricultural regions. Below the Morelos Dam the Colorado is a small stream. It forms the international border for a short distance, between Baja California and Arizona, before drying up in the desert and reaching the Southern International Boundary at San Luis Rio Colorado, where it crosses entirely into Mexico.

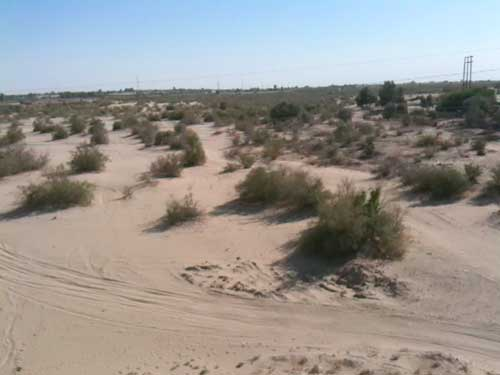
Colorado River as it exits the United States into Mexico beneath the San Luis Colorado-Colonia Miguel Aléman Bridge (September 09)

For the remainder of its course to the Gulf, the river forms the boundary between Baja California (west) and Sonora (east). "River", however, is a misnomer as the Colorado is dry or small stream most of the year, due to its flow being almost completely exhausted by upstream diversions. The river bed will occasionally contain water, though, due either to monsoon storms over the Gila River Basin, or more rarely due to a particularly heavy snowmelt in the Rocky Mountains. Since the filling of Lake Powell in the 1960s the latter has only occurred four times – the unusually wet years of 1983 through 1986. In May 2014, an agreement between the US and Mexican governments known as Minute 319 enabled the intentional release of water into the Colorado River bed for the first time, with the goal of revitalizing the ecosystem of the Colorado River Delta.

Prior to the mid 20th century, the 3,000-square-mile (7,800 km^{2}) Colorado River Delta provided a rich estuarine marshland; while today it is now essentially desiccated, the river is still an important salt-water estuary resource. The estuary of the Colorado River was subjected to a major tidal bore that has almost disappeared with the drastic reduction in the freshwater flow following the irrigation diversions of the Colorado River, and to a lesser extent because of some dredging of the estuary channel. The first historical record of the tidal bore was that of the Croatian missionary in Spanish service Father Ferdinand Konščak on 18 July 1746. During spring tide conditions, the tidal bore formed in the estuary about Montague Island and propagated upstream. It was called locally 'El Burro' or 'burro'. Today the tidal bore is rarely seen although there are still some anecdotal observations.

== See also ==
- List of dams in the Colorado River system
- List of tributaries of the Colorado River
