= Senator Reynolds =

Senator Reynolds may refer to:

== Members of the United States Senate ==
- Robert Rice Reynolds (1884–1963), U.S. senator from North Carolina from 1932 and 1945
- Samuel W. Reynolds (1890–1988), U.S. senator from Nebraska in 1954

== United States state senate members ==
- Benoni Reynolds (1824–1911), Wisconsin State Senate
- Daniel H. Reynolds (1832–1902), Arkansas State Senate
- Deborah Reynolds (fl. 2000s–2010s), New Hampshire State Senate
- Edward Reynolds (American politician) (1856–1938), Maine State Senate
- Florence Reynolds (1898–1985), Nebraska State Senate
- Hubert Reynolds (1860–1938), Colorado State Senate
- Hugh Reynolds (American politician) (fl. 1860s–1870s), Wisconsin State Senate
- James C. Reynolds (1849–1933), Wisconsin State Senate
- John D. Reynolds (1870–1958), Nebraska State Senate
- John F. Reynolds (politician) (1852–1934), Wisconsin State Senate
- Kim Reynolds (born 1959), Iowa State Senate
- Roscoe Reynolds (born 1942), Virginia State Senate
- Thomas G. Reynolds (born 1956), Wisconsin State Senate
