= CAIC =

CAIC may refer to: Cash Accumulation Insurance Contacts, typically universal life insurance used in restrictive employee benefit agreements {REBA} as patented by Geneva Media Holding, LLC.

- Colorado Avalanche Information Center
- Aviation Industry Corporation of China
- Child abuse image content list (or CAIC list) from the Internet Watch Foundation
