= Acre-foot =

Non-SI unit of volume

acre-foot
- An acre-foot volume (not drawn to scale)

General information
- Unit system: US Customary units
- Unit of: Volume
- Symbol: ac⋅ft

Conversions
1 ac⋅ft in ...	... is equal to ...
- SI units: ≈ 1,233.482 m^{3}
- US customary units: 43,560 ft^{3}
- US customary units: ≈ 325,851.4 US gal
- Imperial units: ≈ 271,328.1 imp gal

The acre-foot is a non-SI unit of volume equal to about 1,233 m^{3} commonly used in the western United States in reference to large-scale water resources, such as reservoirs, aqueducts, canals, sewer flow capacity, irrigation water, and river flows.

An acre-foot is approximately the volume of water needed to fill an eight-lane swimming pool, 82 ft (25 m) long, 52 ft (16 m) wide and 9.8 ft (3 m) deep.

== Definitions ==
As the name suggests, an acre-foot is defined as the volume of water that would cover one acre of surface area to a depth of one foot.

Since an acre is defined as a chain by a furlong (i.e. 66 ft × 660 ft or 20.12 m × 201.17 m), an acre-foot is 43,560 cubic feet (1,233.5 m^{3}).

There have been two definitions of the acre-foot (differing by about 0.0006%), using either the international foot (0.3048 m) or a U.S. survey foot (exactly 1200/3937 meters since 1893). On 31 December 2022, the National Institute of Standards and Technology, the National Geodetic Survey, and the United States Department of Commerce deprecated use of the US survey foot and recommended conversion to either the meter or the international foot.

1 acre-foot	= 43,560 cubic feet
	= 75,271,680 in^{3}
	= 325,851 3/7 US gal (Note: As the foot is used via the inch to define the U.S. gallon, the number of US gallons in an acre feet is the same no matter which foot is used)
international	= 1233.48183754752 m^{3} (using the 0.3048 m foot)
U.S. survey	≈ 1,233.4892 m^{3} (using the 1200/3937 m foot)

== Application ==
As a rule of thumb in US water management, one acre-foot is taken to be the planned annual water usage of a suburban family household. (Note: The state of Montana assumes 1.0 acre-foot per year (1,200 m^{3}/a) for a family of five.) In some areas of the desert Southwest, where water conservation is followed and often enforced, a typical family uses only about 0.25 acre-feet (310 m^{3}) of water per year. One acre-foot per year is approximately 119.26 cubic feet per day (3.38 cubic meters per day).

The acre-foot per year has been used historically in the US in many water-management agreements, for example the Colorado River Compact, which divides 15 million acre-feet per year (19 cubic kilometers per year) among seven western US states.

Water reservoir capacities in the US are commonly given in thousands of acre-feet, abbreviated TAF or KAF.

In most other countries except the US, the metric system is in common use, and water volumes are normally expressed in liters, cubic meters or cubic kilometers. One acre-foot is approximately equivalent to 1.233 megaliters. Large bodies of water may be measured in cubic kilometers (1 km^{3} equals 1 billion cubic meters or 1,000 gigaliters); 1 million acre-feet approximately equals 1.233 km^{3}.

A volumetric change of 10 acre-feet per hour is equivalent to exactly 121 cubic feet per second. Dividing by 120, this reduces to 1 acre-inch per hour is approximately 1.01 ft^{3}/s. This can be visualized as such: suppose a 1-acre field is receiving a sustained rainfall of 1 inch per hour. To prevent the field from flooding or overflowing, the drainage system must be able to handle a discharge of at least 1 cubic foot per second.

== See also ==
- Cubic meter per second
- Cubic foot per second
- List of unusual units of measurement
- United States customary units
- Unit of measurement
