= Colorado Water Conservation Board =

U.S. state government division

The Colorado Water Conservation Board (CWCB) operates as a division of the Colorado Department of Natural Resources. The Colorado legislature founded the Colorado Water Conservation Board (CWCB) through the passage of House Bill no. 6 in 1937 for the "purpose of aiding in the protection and development of the waters of the state". The bill decreed that the agency would be run by twelve directors, who convened for the first time on July 13, 1937.

Today, the CWCB represents each major water basin, Denver and other state agencies in a joint effort to use water wisely and protect water for future generations. Governed by a fifteen-member Board of Directors, the CWCB acts as the state's most comprehensive water information resource. The agency maintains expertise in a broad range of programs and provides technical assistance to further the utilization of Colorado's waters. The CWCB's responsibilities range from protecting Colorado's streams and lakes to water conservation, flood mitigation, watershed protection, stream restoration, drought planning, water supply planning and water project financing. The CWCB also works to protect the state's water appropriations in collaboration with other western states and federal agencies. Each CWCB program is directed by the agency's Strategic Framework, as well as through Statutory Authorities and Responsibilities. Reviewed annually by the Board, the Strategic Plan also contains a Board Member Work Plan, which guides the Board's actions and helps implement the authorities and objectives of the CWCB.

== History ==
When the CWCB first formed the agency was charged with defending and developing Colorado's water resources. In many ways these two actions define the first 30 years of the agency's history. However, in the 1970s and 1980s the CWCB began to enter into a transitional phase as an agency. With the rise of the environmental movement, the CWCB began to take on new statuary responsibilities. An integral part of the transition years was the General Assembly's enactment of laws giving the CWCB its first three major new programs since 1937 – floodplain designations, loans for water project construction and appropriation of instream flow water rights.

In November 2015, the CWCB released the Colorado Water Plan, following an executive order from the Governor of Colorado issued in May 2013. The plan is an attempt to plan promulgate a regulatory framework that has measurable objectives, goals and action by which the state will address projected future water supply and demand.

== Funding and budget ==
The CWCB is almost fully self-funded. The agency does not receive any money from the General Fund. The majority of funding appropriations for the CWCB comes from the CWCB Construction Fund (referred to as "Cash Funds"). CWCB Sections With more than 40 staff members, the CWCB functions with six major program areas: Management Finance & Administration Interstate & Federal Stream & Lake Protection Water Supply Planning Watershed & Flood Protection

The CWCB and the Interbasin Compact Committee The CWCB supports the implementation of the Colorado Water for the 21st Century Act, which created the Interbasin Compact Committee (IBCC), with financial, technical and staff support. The CWCB ensures the proper coordination of CWCB information, policies and resources for each of the Basin Roundtables.

== Agency role ==
The CWCB is Colorado's statewide water policy agency. The CWCB performs numerous functions through distinct program areas in support of this role. The Board:

1. provides common technical platforms for planning and policy decisions;
2. Builds and manages information to guide actions;
3. Helps reduce the impacts of floods and droughts;
4. Takes actions to protect Colorado's compact entitlements;
5. Holds instream flow water rights to preserve the natural environment to a reasonable degree;
6. Works with partners to develop policies and implement strategies for meeting Colorado's consumptive and non-consumptive water needs.

The CWCB supports strategy implementation through:

- Funding
- Policy development and implementation
- Planning
- Data collection and analysis
- Outreach and technical assistance

== See also ==
- Colorado Division of Water Resources
- Colorado River Watch
