= Colorado River dispute =

Water rights dispute between the United States and Mexico

The Colorado River dispute is a long-running dispute between the United States and Mexico over water rights to the Colorado River.

== Background ==
In 1884, the International Boundary and Water Commission was founded between Mexico and the United States as an entity to, among other things, oversee the flow of water from the United States to Mexico. The IBaWC negotiated the 1944 United States-Mexico Treaty for Utilization of Water of the Rio Grande, Colorado, and Tijuana rivers and allotted to Mexico a guaranteed annual quantity of water from these sources. However the treaty did not define the quality of the water. This became a problem with rapid development in the southern United States in the late 1950s, when the United States began diverting significant amounts of water from the Colorado River for the newly developed areas. Mexico protested and entered into negotiations with the United States. In 1974 an international agreement resulted in interpreting the 1944 treaty as guaranteeing Mexico the same quality of water as that being used in the United States.

== Legislation ==
- 1922- The Colorado River Compact was signed by the seven states part of the Colorado River Basin. Its goal was to allocate the water in two parts, an Upper Division and Lower Division. The Compact was amended in 2007 to preserve the water in the event of shortages.
- 1973 - The Endangered Species Act was passed to protect endangered species.
- 1974 - The Colorado River Basin Salinity Control Act was passed to deal with salinity and water quality.
- 1992 - The Grand Canyon Protection Act was passed to recognize the recreational value of the Colorado River to Grand Canyon National Park.

== California water agencies agreement 2003 ==
In 2003, the water agencies of Southern California agreed to Quantification Settlement Agreement which would move millions of gallons from the river, which was originally used by desert farmers and divert it towards the fast-growing city of San Diego.

== Plans to end the river dispute 2003 ==
In 2003, four Southern California water agencies, that had failed to reach a key Colorado River water-sharing pact, were studying a proposal that addressed the deal's main stumbling blocks. Government aides, including Gray Davis, proposed that the state Department of Water Resources explore a billion-dollar plan to shrink the size of the Salton Sea and restore it to health. If the plan was feasible, farm runoff, that would otherwise have flowed into the sea, could be desalinated and sent to San Diego County. He also proposed that farmers would pay a $1 surcharge for every acre-foot of Colorado River water they use over the next 35 years. Urban users, who use less river water, would pay a $3 fee per acre-foot. The millions generated would cover the cost of new wetland habitats as well as air quality and Salton Sea mitigation associated with the water transfer to San Diego.
