= Colorado Division of Water Resources =

State agency of Colorado, United States

The Colorado Division of Water Resources, also known as the Office of the State Engineer, administers water resources in the American state of Colorado. Part of the Department of Natural Resources, the agency is headed by the State Engineer.

== Mission ==
According to their mission statement, the agency

administers water rights, issues water well permits, represents Colorado in interstate water compact proceedings, monitors streamflow and water use, approves construction and repair of dams and performs dam safety inspections, issues licenses for well drillers and assures the safe and proper construction of water wells, and maintains numerous databases of Colorado water information.

== See also ==
- Colorado Department of Natural Resources
- Colorado Water Conservation Board
- Colorado Water Quality Control Division
- Colorado Water Trust
- Colorado Water Courts
- Water in Colorado
