= Colorado Avalanche Information Center =

The Colorado Avalanche Information Center (CAIC) provides information about snowpack stability throughout the state of Colorado for motorists and backcountry recreationists in order to reduce the number of avalanche deaths, injuries, and economic damages within the state. Colorado accounts for 1/3 of avalanche deaths within the United States, and avalanches are the most deadly natural disaster within Colorado. The Center, originally called the Colorado Avalanche Warning Center, was initially created in 1973 as part of a US Forest Service program which ended in 1983, when it was transferred to the Colorado Department of Natural Resources. Between 1987 and 2013 the Center was part of the Colorado Geological Survey, but has since been spun off the CGS. The CAIC provides contractual services to the Colorado Department of Transportation.

== Organization ==
CAIC's main office is in Boulder, with field offices in Aspen, Breckenridge, and in the San Juan Mountains. The Center employs 15 "avalanche professionals".

== Work ==
Colorado has a large population of people who utilize mountain roads, and there is an increasing number of people who recreate in the backcountry. The Center provides education to backcountry athletes and motorists who desire to learn more about the mountain and safety.
