= Colorado River Watch =

Volunteer water quality monitoring program

Colorado River Watch is a statewide volunteer water quality monitoring program operated by the non-profit organization Earth Force, in collaboration with Colorado Parks and Wildlife. Its mission is to work with voluntary stewards to monitor water quality and other indicators of watershed health, and utilize this high quality data to educate citizens and inform decision makers about the condition of Colorado's waters. This data is also used in the Clean Water Act decision-making process. River Watch's motto is "Real people doing real science for a real purpose."

== Program ==
River Watch started with six schools in 1989 on the Yampa River. Since then, over 70,000 people have participated with 900 stations, and 400 water bodies on record. River Watch is the largest statewide volunteer monitoring program in the US, with over 4000 samples taken per year. Over 70% of the volunteers are school groups, with citizen groups, individuals, colleges, youth programs, government agencies, and non-profit organizations also volunteering. The goals of River Watch are:

- To collect quality aquatic ecosystem data over space and time to be used water-quality decision making
- To provide hands on experience for individuals to understand the value and function of the river ecosystem

== Methods for analysis ==
River Watch volunteers around the state collect data at their local watersheds and provide this data to River Watch, which organizes and publishes the data. Each volunteer group receives the training, support, and supplies needed to monitor their respective rivers and provide consistent and accurate data. Sampling and analytical procedures follow Standard Methods for the Examination of Water and Wastewater (2001) and/or EPA guidelines. Each site is tested for a variety of parameters to give an overall indication of the water health. Additional samples are analyzed by a professional lab for metals, nutrients, and macroinvertebrates. Quality assurance is essential in the program operation, and data and quality control checks are performed regularly through the year. Twenty percent of all samples from the field are for QA/QC. River Watch data is stored on an Internet server and can be accessed by anyone. All the data is reviewed and validated by Colorado Parks and Wildlife before it is made public. The high quality River Watch data is currently utilized by the Colorado Department of Public Health and Environment's Water Quality Control Commission, Colorado Parks and Wildlife, and many grassroots level watershed groups in the state for the management of Colorado’s waters.

== Metals, nutrients, and field parameters sampled ==
Volunteers collect samples for physical, biological, and chemical data components. Physical components, usually measured by volunteers in the field, include pH, dissolved oxygen, hardness, and alkalinity. Biological testing is largely done through macroinvertebrate sampling, completed by an outside laboratory, and indicates the health of the sampled area. Twice a year volunteers collect nutrient samples for analysis of total phosphorus, nitrate and nitrite, ammonia, chloride, sulfate, and total suspended solids. Chemical data components are collected monthly for total and dissolved metals analyses. This includes aluminum, arsenic, calcium, cadmium, copper, iron, magnesium, manganese, lead, sodium, potassium, selenium, and zinc.

== See also ==
- Water quality
- Water Quality Act
