= Colorado Water Quality Control Division =

U.S. state government agency

The Colorado Water Quality Control Division is part of the Colorado Department of Public Health and Environment. The Water Quality Control Division implements the federal Clean Water Act and Safe Drinking Water Act in Colorado. It is responsible for water control for the state of Colorado to ensure the protection of both the environment and the public. The division enforces these laws through methods such as implementing local laws and regulations, permits, and routine inspections of public water systems and facilities.

== Focus ==
The Colorado Water Quality Control Division focuses on water quality for the State of Colorado. Its objective is to protect and maintain the quality of water for the public and the environment, as well as ensuring the safest distribution of drinking water. It also implements and enforces policies based on water-related issues. A list of all current and non-current policies can be found here.

== Programs and Services ==
=== Source Water Assessment and Protection Program ===
One program is the Source Water Assessment and Protection Program, which provides information about the process of purifying and the phases in which water is purified. It encourages public protection and preventive management strategies to ensure that all public drinking water resources are kept safe from future contamination. The program gives a report on water sources across Colorado, giving a detailed report on their conditions. The Water Assessment phase evaluates water sources, scanning for potential water contamination. A list of assessment reports by counties are listed here.

=== Permits ===
The division also hands out permits for working in wastewater and stormwater areas. Permits are offered for each sector, which details the planning and regulations in each of those sectors. The types of permits offered are as follows:Biosolids, Construction, Commerce and Industry, Municipal Stormwater Permitting, Pesticide Permitting, Pretreatment, Reclaimed Water, and Sewage Systems.

=== Inspections ===
Inspections are carried out by the Water Quality Control Division, which focuses on ensuring the quality of public water systems across Colorado. There are two types of surveys.

==== Sanitary Survey ====
Sanitary Surveys are reviews of specific elements at a public water system to evaluate a facility's ability to produce and distribute drinking water. These surveys are required to be done every three to five years for all public water systems. The inspection letter details any significant violations and deficiencies in the public water system, along with general observations and recommendations to improve the system.

==== Wastewater Inspection ====
Wastewater Inspections are reviews of a facility's ability to meet the requirements of the Colorado Discharge Permit System. It inspects three types of facilities, which are Biosolids, Commerce and Industry, and Domestic Wastewater Systems. Inspections, depending on the facility, are done every 1–5 years.

== Clean Water Act ==
The Clean Water Act, implemented in 1972, established a system with the goal of eliminating toxic substances in water and eliminating water pollution.

== Safe Drinking Water Act ==
The Safe Drinking Water Act, implemented in 1974, establishes rules and regulations to ensure safe drinking water for the public. Standards are established across all states to ensure that all drinking water meets established standards.

== See also ==
- Colorado Division of Water Resources
