= La Poudre Pass =

Mountain pass in Colorado, USA

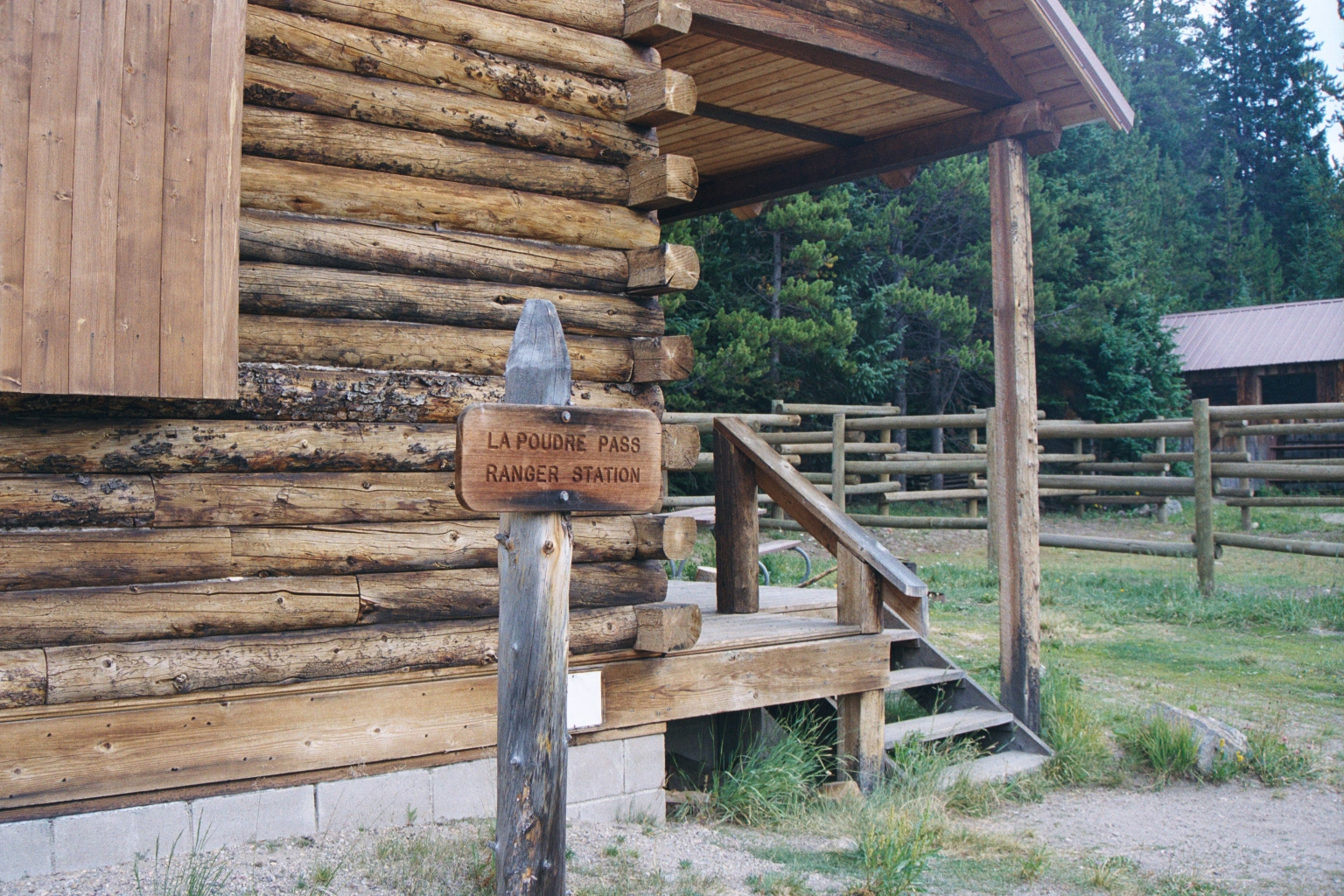
- La Poudre Pass Ranger Station, Rocky Mountain National Park

- Location within Colorado
- Elevation: 10,184 ft (3,104 m)
- Traversed by: Trail, Grand Ditch, private maintenance road for Grand Ditch

Third Approach
- Location: Grand / Larimer counties, Colorado, U.S.
- Range: Rocky Mountains
- Coordinates: 40°28′36″N 105°49′24″W
- Topo map: USGS Fall River Pass

La Poudre Pass (elevation 10,184 ft (3,104 m)), a high mountain pass, is located in the Rocky Mountains of northern Colorado in the United States.

The pass straddles the Continental Divide, and separates the headwaters of La Poudre Pass Creek, which joins the Cache la Poudre River and eventually empties into the Gulf of Mexico, from the headwaters of the Colorado River, which drains into the Gulf of California. At the pass, the Continental Divide is the boundary between Grand and Larimer counties, and is also the northern boundary of Rocky Mountain National Park.

The pass itself is a broad, flat, swampy area. In the wet meadow just south of the divide, the Colorado River begins its course as a tiny stream emerging from this area which includes the small La Poudre Pass Lake. The Rocky Mountain National Park La Poudre Pass Ranger Station is also located in the pass.

The pass is traversed by a hiking trail, by the Grand Ditch as it carries water from the Never Summer Mountains into the Cache La Poudre River, and by a private, gated, maintenance road for the Grand Ditch.

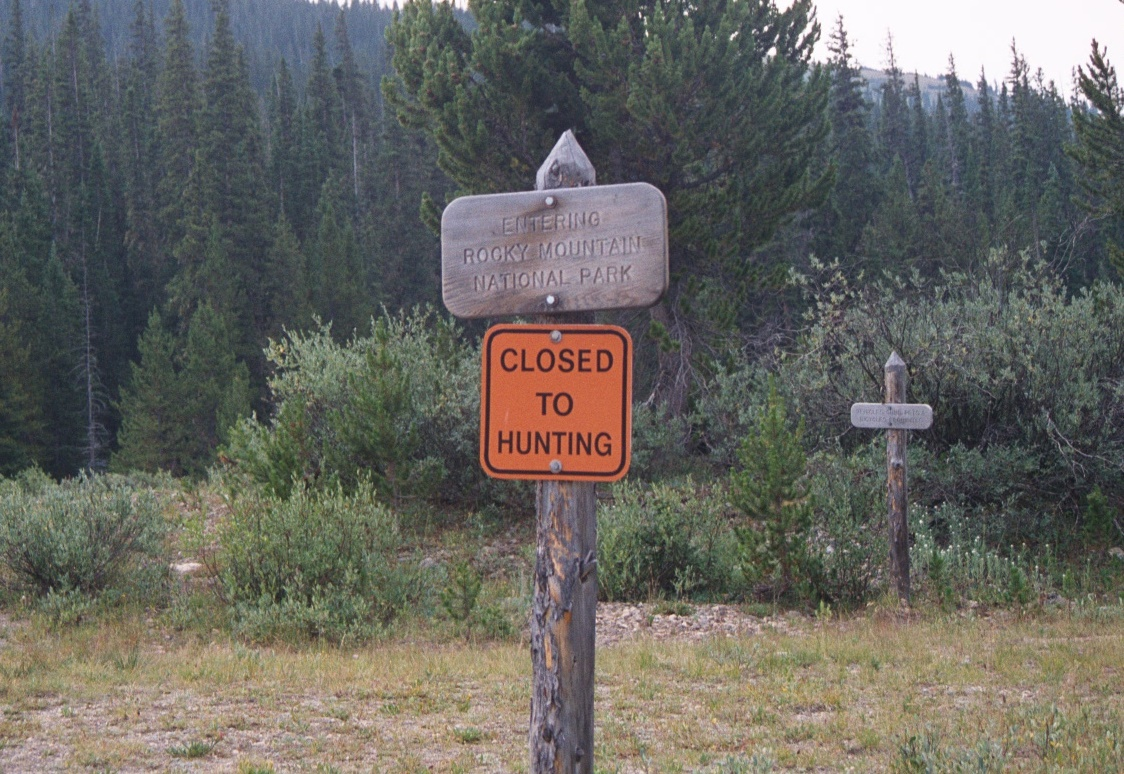
Entrance sign to Rocky Mountain National Park, in La Poudre Pass. This sign also marks the Continental Divide, and the boundary between Grand and Larimer Counties.

To access the pass, visitors should follow Long Draw Road south from its junction with State Highway 14 in Poudre Canyon, just east of Cameron Pass. Long Draw Road is unpaved, but can be traveled by regular passenger automobiles. After passing Long Draw Reservoir, the road ends at the La Poudre Pass Trailhead parking area. It's a very short walk from here to the pass, which is marked by the entrance sign to the Rocky Mountain National Park. This sign is also located on the Continental Divide.
