= Hubert Reynolds =

American politician

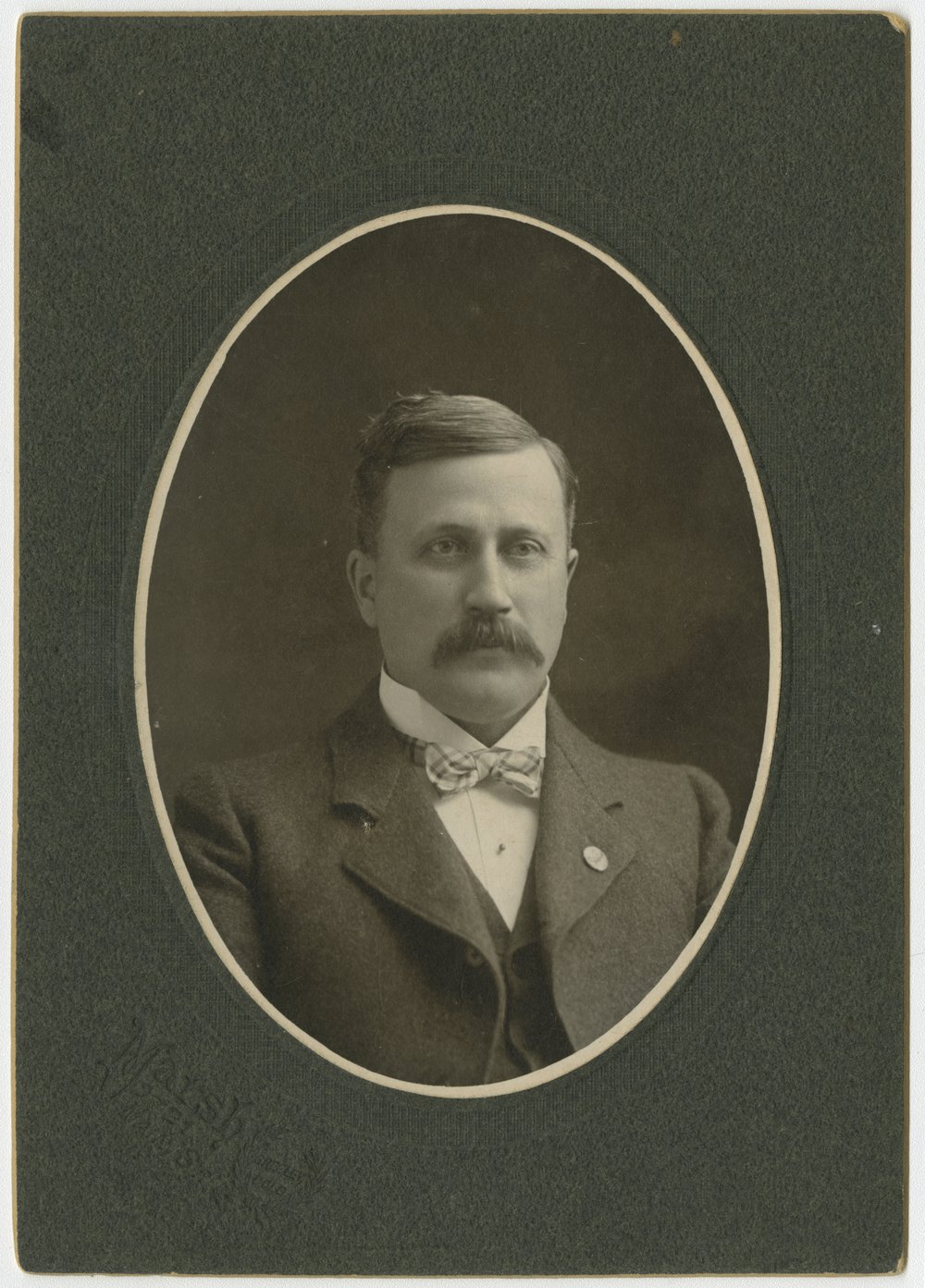
- Hubert Reynolds, around 1900.

Member of the Colorado Senate from the 7th district
- In office January 1, 1913 – September 1, 1913
- Preceded by: Delphus E. Carpenter
- Succeeded by: Robert E. Winbourne

Personal details
- Born: Hubert Reynolds; May 10, 1860 South Amherst, Ohio, U.S.
- Died: December 12, 1938 Greeley, Colorado, U.S.
- Party: Democratic
- Spouse(s): Minule A. Culver (m. 1889; died 1901) Mary M. Jones (m. 1903)
- Children: 4

Hubert Reynolds (May 10, 1860 – December 12, 1938) was an American pharmacist, public servant and Colorado State Senator.

== Early life and education ==
Hubert Reynolds was born on May 10, 1860, in South Amherst, Ohio, to Lord Nelson Reynolds and June Reynolds, both natives of New York. He moved to Monroe, Michigan, when he was nine years old. He went to school there for nine years.

Reynolds came to Colorado in January 1878 to work on a ranch near Fowler, Colorado, which was, at the time, owned by his brother-in-law Burrell D. Smith. After Smith sold the ranch in the fall of 1882, Reynolds briefly lived in a mining camp in Leadville, Colorado. He then moved to Las Animas, Colorado, and worked in a pharmacy there. In 1886, he decided to study pharmacy at Northwestern University in Chicago. Reynolds graduated in 1888 and resumed his position at the Las Animas pharmacy.

== Professional life ==
In 1893, he opened a new pharmacy in Greeley, Colorado, while he still hold a financial stake in the Las Animas pharmacy. He sold his pharmacy in Greeley and all his financial interests in other pharmacies in 1910. Later he invested in water stocks and ranches. He founded the commercial club of Greeley, which later became the local Chamber of Commerce. Reynolds was considered a leader of the local business community in Greeley.

== Political career ==
Before moving to Greeley in 1893, Reynolds served one term as city alderman of Las Animas. In the 1910 elections, Reynolds ran for County assessor of Weld County on the Democratic ticket. He campaigned on his business experience. He lost that race to Republican A.R. Fischer by a 54–46 margin.

In 1912, he was elected to represent Senate District 7 as a Democrat in the 19th Colorado General Assembly. At the time, the district contained all of Weld County. The Democrats achieved a 24-11 majority in the Colorado Senate in the 1912 elections. Therefore, Reynolds was able to chair the Senate Committee on Constitutional Amendments.

Reynolds received an appointment by President Woodrow Wilson to serve as the postmaster in his hometown Greeley. He was recommended by Democratic Congressman Harry H. Seldomridge. Democratic Congressman George John Kindel unsuccessfully protested Reynolds' appointment in a letter to President Wilson. As a result of his appointment, Hubert Reynolds resigned his senate seat on September 1, 1913.

=== Greeley Post Office robbery ===
During Reynolds service as Postmaster, the Greeley Post Office saw a robbery on December 26, 1918. The robbers stole United States stamps valued at $69,300 (equivalent to $1,483,357 in 2025). At the time, this robbery was third largest robbery of a United States Post Office in history. The crime has not been solved and the perpetrators have never been identified.

In accordance to the law at the time, Hubert Reynolds was personally liable for the loss. Losses over $10,000 (equivalent to $214,049 in 2025) could only repaid to the respective postmaster if an act of the United States Congress allowed so. On November 4, 1921, the House of Representatives passed House Resolution (H.R.) 2003 "An Act For the relief of Hubert Reynolds" with 215-43 vote. In the Senate, the relief bill was delayed due to filibuster tactics. On September 22, 1922, Congress finally approved H. R. 2003, which relieved Reynolds of the liability and repaid him the $69,300.

The Greeley Post Office had been robbed before, on the night of July 1, 1911. In that robbery stamps valued over $10,000 (equivalent to $345,536 in 2025) were stolen. In reaction to the 1911 robbery, a new post office building, which opened in 1914, had been constructed.

== Personal life ==
In 1889, Reynolds married Minnie A. Culver who was the only daughter of a Las Animas family. His first wife died in Greeley on May 23, 1901. Reynolds married Mary M. Jones of Denver, who was a direct descendant of Daniel Boone, on June 3, 1903. Reynolds had four children, all born to his first wife Minnie. Hubert Reynolds’ home was originally located at 1117 9th Avenue in Greeley. It has since been relocated to the City of Greeley’s Centennial Village Museum.

His son Burton Ralph Reynolds died of influenza during World War I, while serving in United States Army Air Service in Stockton, California.

== Electoral history ==
Weld county assessor general election, 1910
Party	Candidate	Votes	%	±%
Republican	A.R. Fischer (Incumbent)	4,817	54.07%	
Democratic	Hubert Reynolds	4,092	45.93%	
Total votes		8,909	100.00%	
Majority		725	8.14%	
Republican hold				

Colorado's 7th Senate district general election, 1912
Party	Candidate	Votes	%	±%
Democratic	Hubert Reynolds	4,760	44.07%	−4.47%
Republican	Delphus E. Carpenter (Incumbent)	3,944	36.52%	−14.94%
Progressive	Robt. M. Haythorn	2,096	19.41%	+19.41%
Total votes		10,800	100.00%	
Plurality		784	7.55%	
Democratic gain from Republican				
