= League of the Southwest =

Agreement promoting irrigation

- Formation: 1919
- Founder: Governor Simon Bamberger

The League of the Southwest was a 1919 alliance formed among U.S. states in the basin of the Colorado River with the intention of promoting development, in particular irrigation of cropland for agriculture, along the river. In 1921, two years later, the United States Congress authorized the states to negotiate an agreement for allocation of the river water, leading to the 1922 Colorado River Compact.

The League of the Southwest, the brainchild of San Diego promoter Arnold Kruckman, launched its developmental program for the Southwestern states with a gala convention at the Hotel del Coronado near San Diego in November, 1917. The fourth meeting (Denver) of the League, now a single-issue organization dedicated to the development of the Colorado River, was the occasion for Colorado lawyer Delph Carpenter's proposal that the Colorado River states create a compact or interstate treaty under Article I Section 10 of the U.S. Constitution
