= Colorado Division of Forestry =

State agency of Colorado, United States

The Colorado Division of Forestry (DOF) was a result of the Colorado General Assembly's House Bill number 00-1460 of 2000. This Division monitors the health of all forests in Colorado, including national and private forests. DOF focuses on forest health, both grow and its maintenance; instead of the revenue generated from forest activities.

By state statute, DOF is headed by the State Forester, under the auspices from the Forestry Advisory Board, and staffed by the Colorado State Forest Service (CSFS), a program of Colorado State University.

== Mission ==
The state of Colorado values healthy, resilient forest landscapes and is willing to invest state funds in the stewardship of these resources.

== Forestry Advisory Board ==
The Forestry Advisory Board is made up of seven members that are appointed by Governor to represent agricultural, environmental, private landownership, and timber industry interests. This Board held its initial meeting on November 19, 2001. The Board’s agenda was discuss and review of the first annual Report on the Condition of Colorado’s Forests. This report, required by act, provided an overview of Colorado’s forested landscape, summarized existing areas and issues of concerns. It also created the beginning of a public dialogue regarding the future of the state’s forest resources.

== Colorado State Forest Service ==
The mission of the Colorado State Forest Service is to achieve stewardship of Colorado's diverse forest environments for the benefit of present and future generations.

== See also ==
- List of Colorado state forests
