= Delphus E. Carpenter =

American politician (1877–1951)

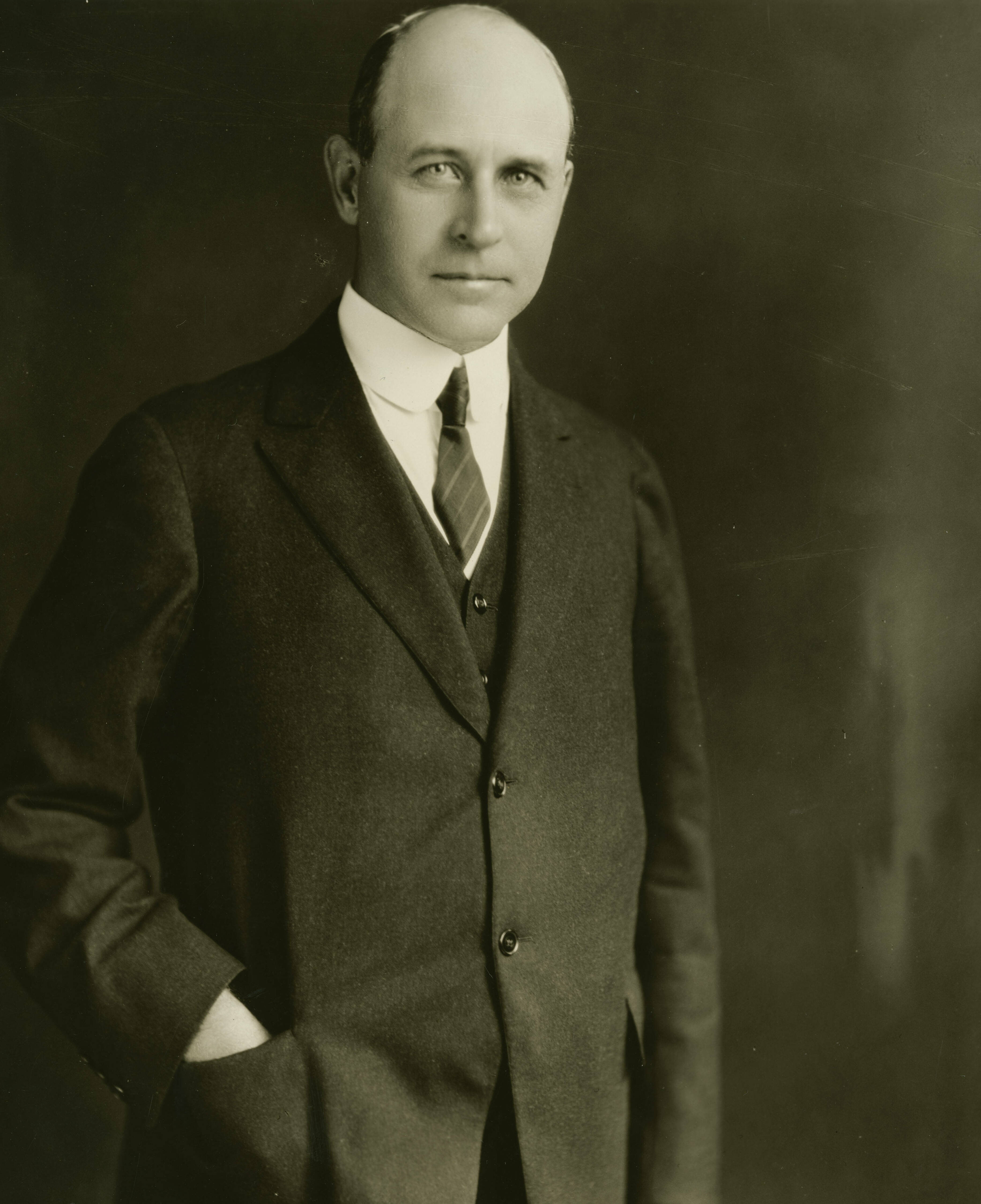

Member of the Colorado Senate from the 7th district
- In office January 6, 1909 – January 1, 1913
- Preceded by: William E. Clayton
- Succeeded by: Hubert Reynolds

Personal details
- Born: 13 May 1877 Greeley, Colorado, US
- Died: 27 February 1951 (aged 73)
- Party: Republican
- Spouse: Michaela (née Hogarty)
- Profession: Lawyer, State Commissioner

Delphus Emory Carpenter (1877–1951) was the Commissioner of Interstate Streams for the State of Colorado at a time when Western States' water rights were becoming a legal battleground, and became the primary driver behind the Colorado River Compact of 1922.

Carpenter was raised on an irrigated farm in northern Colorado, where water was a precious resource. In 1899 after graduation from the University of Denver Law School, he went into practice in his hometown, serving community water-related legal needs. From 1909–1913, Carpenter served as a state senator representing his home district. Carpenter was the first native-born Coloradan elected to the state senate, and he served as a Republican. When the Greeley-Poudre Irrigation District constructed a tunnel to divert water from Wyoming's Laramie River, Carpenter became lead counsel in the Wyoming vs. Colorado lawsuit that resulted, twice arguing the case before the U.S. Supreme Court. As the issue of water as a state resource grew, Carpenter conceived the idea of the legal compact as an out-of-court solution to the West's water conflicts, invoking the Compact Clause of the U.S. Constitution. The interstate water compacts Carpenter helped develop, particularly the 1922 Colorado River Compact, without which Hoover Dam would not have been built, form an enduring legacy.

A book about Carpenter's life and career was published in 2003. His papers have been preserved at Colorado State University's Morgan Library in Fort Collins, Colorado.

== Personal ==
Carpenter was born May 13, 1877. He was a first generation descendant of original settlers of the 1870 Union Colony of Colorado. Carpenter married Michaela Hogarty in 1901. He suffered from Parkinson's disease, which eventually left him bedridden from 1933 until his death on February 27, 1951.

== Sources ==
- Tyler, Daniel (January 1998). "The Silver Fox of the Rockies: Delphus Emory Carpenter and the Colorado River Compact". New Mexico Historical Review. 73 (1): 25–48.
- Tyler, Daniel (2003). Silver Fox of the Rockies: Delphus E. Carpenter and Western Water Compacts. Norman, Okla.: University of Oklahoma Press. ISBN 0-8061-3515-8.
