= La Poudre Pass Lake =

Lake in Colorado, United States

- Location within Colorado Location within the United States
- Location: Rocky Mountain National Park, Colorado
- Coordinates: 40°28′24″N 105°49′31″W
- Primary outflows: Colorado River
- Basin countries: United States
- Surface elevation: 3,101 m (10,174 ft)

La Poudre Pass Lake (3,101 m (10,174 ft)) is a small lake located in the Rocky Mountains of northern Colorado in the United States.

The lake is located within Rocky Mountain National Park, generally in La Poudre Pass, just south of the Continental Divide. The lake lies just southeast of La Poudre Pass Creek. It can be reached on foot via the La Poudre Pass trail.

La Poudre Pass Lake drains to the south as the source of the Colorado River.
