= Colorado Geological Survey =

Geological Survey of the U.S. State of Colorado

Coordinates: 38.9972°N 105.5478°W

The Colorado Geological Survey (CGS) is the primary geoscience agency of the U.S. State of Colorado. The headquarters of the CGS are located at the Colorado School of Mines in Golden, Colorado.

== Mission ==
The mission of the CGS is to build a vibrant Colorado economy and sustainable communities, free from geologic hazards, for people of Colorado to live, work and play through good science, collaboration, and sound management of mineral, energy, and water resources.

== History ==
Until 1907, Colorado had no state geological survey, but a series of geologists held the position of Territorial Geologist, a part-time unpaid position. The Colorado Geological Survey was established by the Legislature in 1907, along with the position of State Geologist who was also the Director of the Survey. The first geological survey mysteriously went out of existence sometime during, or after, 1925. The Colorado Geological Survey was re-established in 1967 and continues to provide sound science and service to the citizens of Colorado.

Significant Events in the History of the Colorado Geological Survey:

- 1907 – Legislature creates the Colorado State Geological Survey and appoints the State Geologist to direct it at the University of Colorado, Boulder.
- 1909 – Colorado State Geological Survey publishes first geological map and report.
- 1916 – The name is changed to the Colorado Geological Survey.
- 1925 – The Colorado Geological Survey goes out of existence after publishing 31 Bulletins on various aspects of the geology and mineral resources (including oil shale) of Colorado.
- 1967 – The legislature re-creates the Colorado Geological Survey within the newly formed Department of Natural Resources.
- 1969 – The Colorado Geological Survey becomes operational.
- 1987 – The Colorado Avalanche Information Center (CAIC) becomes part of the Colorado Geological Survey.
- 1992 – The Colorado Geological Survey is placed under the newly formed Division of Minerals and Geology, a regulatory agency.
- 2005 – The legislature re-establishes the Colorado Geological Survey as a separate Division in the Department of Natural Resources.
- 2013 – CGS is transferred to the Colorado School of Mines.

== See also ==
- Bibliography of Colorado
- Geography of Colorado
- Geology of Colorado
- History of Colorado
- Index of Colorado-related articles
- List of Colorado-related lists
- Outline of Colorado
