= Colorado River Compact =

US interstate water allocation agreement

Member states of the Colorado River Compact Upper Division states Lower Division states

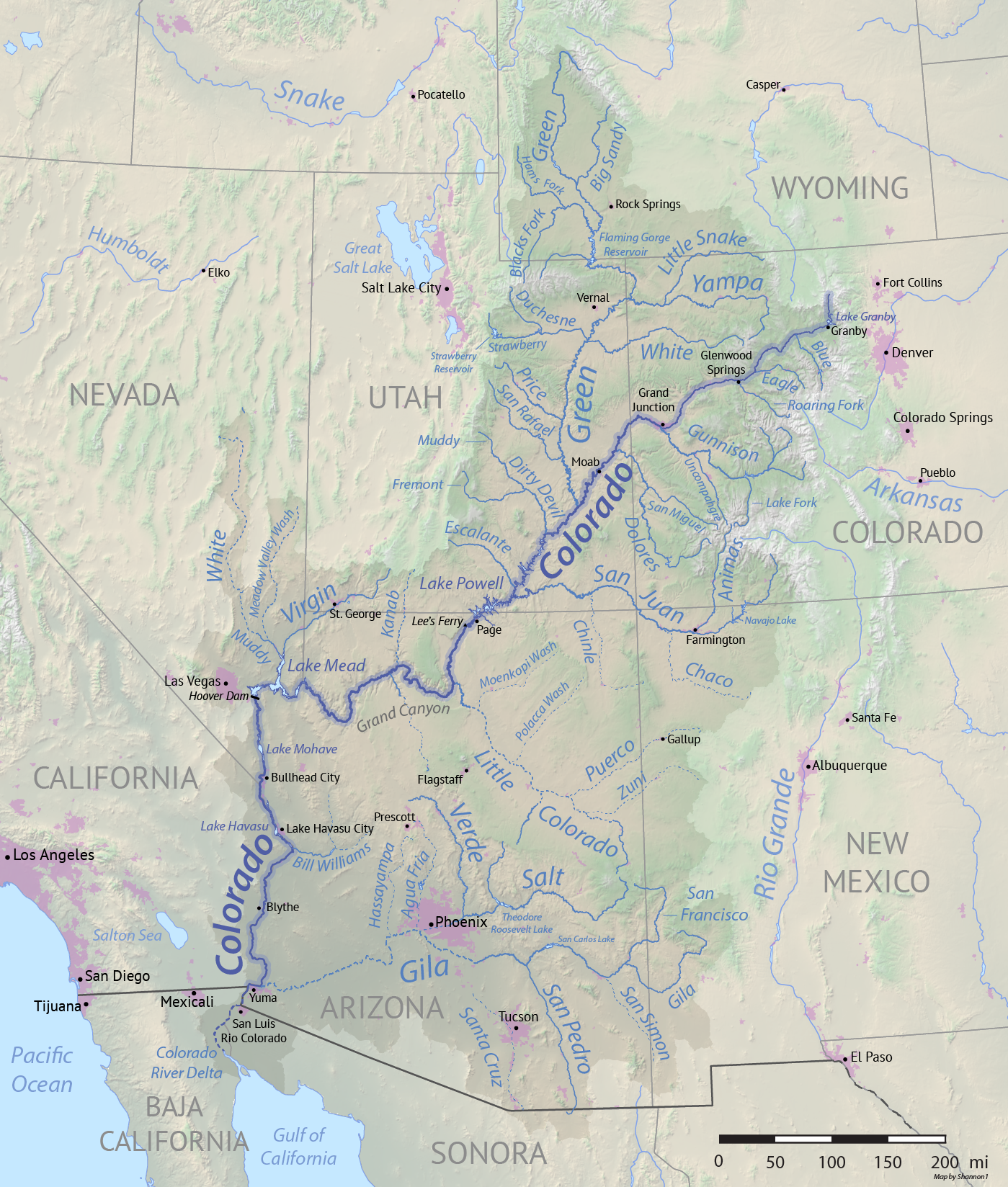
Map of Colorado River Basin

The Colorado River Compact is a 1922 agreement that regulates water distribution among seven states in the Southwestern United States. The compact is about the area within the drainage basin of the Colorado River.

The agreement, originally proposed by attorney Delph Carpenter, was signed at a meeting at Bishop's Lodge, near Santa Fe, New Mexico, by representatives of the seven states the Colorado river and its tributaries pass through on the way to Mexico. The agreement was promoted by Secretary of Commerce Herbert Hoover.

The Colorado River is managed and operated under numerous compacts, federal laws, an international treaty, court decisions and decrees, contracts, and regulatory guidelines collectively known as "the Law of the River".

There are ongoing disputes over tribal claims to parts of the river, with many tribal water rights remaining unquantified. The original agreement overestimated the amount of water that usually flowed through the river, leading to shortages. These shortages have been exacerbated by drought. The Colorado River Delta in Mexico has largely disappeared due to a lack of inflowing water. However, agreements are in place for the water that enters Mexico, and recovery efforts are ongoing.

== Provisions ==
The compact divides the river basin into two areas, the Upper Basin division (comprising Colorado, New Mexico, Utah, and Wyoming) and the Lower Basin division (Nevada, Arizona, and California). The compact requires the Upper Basin states not to deplete the flow of the river below 75,000,000 acre-feet (93 km^{3}) during any period of ten consecutive years. Based on rainfall patterns observed in the years before the treaty's signing in 1922, the amount specified in the compact was assumed to allow a roughly equal division of water between the two regions. The states within each basin were required to divide their 7.5 million acre-feet per year (293 cubic meters per second) share allotment among themselves. The compact enabled the widespread irrigation of the Southwest, as well as the subsequent development of state and federal water works projects under the United States Bureau of Reclamation. Such projects included Hoover Dam and Lake Powell.

The annual allotments in the Lower Basin were established in 1928 as part of the Boulder Canyon Project, while the annual allotments in the Upper Basin were established by the Upper Colorado River Basin Compact of 1948. They are:

Upper Basin, 7.5 million acre·ft/year (293 m^{3}/s) total
Colorado	51.75%*	3.86 million acre·ft/year (150.7 m^{3}/s)
Utah	23.00%*	1.71 million acre·ft/year (67.0 m^{3}/s)
Wyoming	14.00%*	1.04 million acre·ft/year (40.8 m^{3}/s)
New Mexico	11.25%*	0.84 million acre·ft/year (32.8 m^{3}/s)
Arizona	0.70%	0.05 million acre·ft/year (2.0 m^{3}/s)
*Percentages with a star are a percentage of the total after Arizona's; 0.05 million are deducted. Arizona's percentage is of the total.
Lower Basin, 7.5 million acre·ft/year (293 m^{3}/s) total
California	58.70%	4.40 million acre·ft/year (172 m^{3}/s)
Arizona	37.30%	2.80 million acre·ft/year (109 m^{3}/s)
Nevada	4.00%	0.30 million acre·ft/year (12 m^{3}/s)

In addition to this, 1.5 million acre-feet per year (59 cubic meters per second) of Colorado River water is allocated to Mexico, pursuant to the treaty relating to the use of waters of the Colorado and Tijuana rivers and of the Rio Grande, signed February 3, 1944, and its supplementary protocol signed November 14, 1944. Also, the lower basin can get an additional 1.1-million acre⋅ft/a (43 m^{3}/s) in surplus conditions.

The 1922 Colorado River Compact was the fruit of several years of negotiations among the states. The seven states had previously formed the League of the Southwest in 1917 to promote development along the river. In 1921, Congress authorized the states to enter into a compact for allocation of the river resources. The agreement, also known as the Santa Fe Compact, was approved by Congress in 1922, the same year it was signed by the delegates who negotiated the agreement. The agreement was subject to the ratification of the seven states. Six states ratified the agreement by the end of January 1923. Arizona did not sign until 1944.

The compact determined that the water would be shared equally among the upper and lower basins. Before the compact, the river's name was standardized along its length. Previously, the portion of the river upstream from its confluence with the Green River had been known locally as the "Grand River". Many residents in Utah and Colorado opposed the change, and the new name was enforced locally by state legislatures in both states in the early 1920s. One of the major ongoing concerns since the 1920s has been the expanding population, which increased the water demand, particularly in California. In recent years, mainly because of Las Vegas, Nevada, has been seeking greater use of the Colorado River.

The compact did not address many issues, including Tribal or Mexican water rights or how evaporation would be shared among the basins. Later studies of flow found that the compact apportioned more water than would be reliably delivered at the boundary between the two basins. The Compact allowed use of surplus flows by downstream states, but did not provide clear rules addressing shortages.

The compact was controversial at the time. During the Compact negotiations, Governor-elect Hunt laid out his determination to protect Arizona's rights to irrigate its lands and to obtain a portion of the electrical power revenue generated by future dams. There was also fear that Mexico would usurp the surplus water, as treaty rights had not yet been defined, and agricultural development of the Mexican delta was underway. As a result of these concerns and others, the 1923 Arizona legislature refused to ratify the compact.

A 1927 effort among the lower basin states to agree on how to share shortages and surpluses failed. Arizona feared that during times of shortage, it would have to release stored water from the Gila River system to Mexico. Led by Fred Colter, the state refused to sign the compact until two months after Colter died in 1944. In 1944, Mexico and the U.S. negotiated a treaty granting Mexico the right to 1.5 million acre-feet of Colorado River water.

The 1928 Boulder Canyon Project Act allowed the nation to proceed with dam and diversion construction without Arizona's approval. It invited the three lower basin states to divide the waters of the Colorado with 2.8 million acre-feet to Arizona, 300,000 acre-feet to Nevada, and 4.4 million acre-feet to California. It gave Congressional pre-approval to such allotments and to sharing any surplus equally between California and Arizona. The specific state allotments in the Boulder Canyon Act were disputed by Arizona until the United States Supreme Court upheld the amount in the 1963 decision in Arizona v. California.

Arizona also took other steps to protect its water and prevent California from gaining too large a share. In 1934, Arizona, unhappy with California's decision to dam and divert the river, called out the National Guard and even commissioned a two-boat "navy." The contentions over water sharing and the provisions of the Boulder Canyon Project Act were eventually settled in court through a series of four Arizona v. California Supreme Court decisions. The case lasted 11 years and cost over $5 million, requiring the work of over 50 lawyers. Arizona v. California found, for the first time, that Congress had the power to allocate water to the states and had done so through the Boulder Canyon Act, for the lower states (which are California, Nevada, and Arizona). While the Court ultimately ruled in favor of Arizona, it agreed with California's interpretation of how it should receive surplus water supplies. The 1963 court decision ended years of dispute, clearing the way for the Central Arizona Project, which was authorized by Congress in 1968.

== Tribal claims and contributions to flows ==
The 1908 Supreme Court decision Winters v. United States recognized a federal obligation to ensure water for tribal homelands. Under prior appropriation, these federally reserved rights date back to the establishment of the reservations. In theory, the early priority dates of tribal water rights should mean that these rights are among the most valuable and reliable. In practice, many tribes cannot use the water from the Colorado River that flows through their lands. Delays in quantifying water rights have allowed others to use tribal water for decades.

The compact mentions tribal water rights in Article VII: "Nothing in this compact shall be construed as affecting the obligations of the United States of America to Indian Tribes", but the federal government has long delayed actions to meet those obligations. It was not until 1963 that Arizona v. California established how Indian water rights should be quantified. In 2001, Arizona's Supreme Court rejected the standard set in Arizona v. California in favor of a different method. In negotiations, Arizona has established other conditions that tribes find reprehensible, a factor which has also delayed use or delivery of water to reservations.

There are 30 federally recognized tribes in the Colorado River basin, 12 of which still struggle to get all of their water rights. The Navajo Nation has the largest water right in the Colorado River basin that is yet to be quantified. The Navajo sued in 2003 for their water rights; the Supreme Court decided in 2023 that the federal government cannot be forced to act in a timely way to quantify or settle their claims to the river.

The Colorado River Indian Tribes have one of the largest and oldest rights to the flow of the Colorado River. By volunteering to leave part of their nearly 720,000-acre-foot allocation in Lake Mead, they forestalled deeper cutbacks for others along the Colorado River system under the 2019 Drought Contingency Plan.

== Over-use, climate change, and other issues ==
Since the development of the Colorado River Compact, California (and Arizona) have been using surplus water left over by other states. With increasing population growth in the Southwest, there was concern that this surplus would soon no longer be available to California. In 2001, Secretary of the Interior Bruce Babbitt signed an interim agreement determining how water surplus from the Colorado River would be allocated between the states and creating a 15-year period to allow California time to put conservation methods in place to reduce the state's water usage and dependence on Colorado River water.

The Lower Basin has received a total of 10 million acre-feet of water above and beyond the Compact requirements since January 2000, but the levels of Lake Mead have been dropping. The steady depletion of water at Lake Mead due to over-allocation of the flows is called the "structural deficit". According to Thomas McCann, former Deputy Manager for the Central Arizona Project, the deficit is caused by 1) avoiding any allocation of evaporation costs to the Lower Basin states, and 2) meeting Mexican Treaty obligations by taking water out of Lake Mead storage rather than out of Arizona and California's allocations. Continued structural deficit at Lake Mead puts the reliability of the Lower Basin's water and hydroelectric power at risk if lake levels should drop too low.

Nevada, with the smallest water allocation in the lower river basin, became concerned that the decline in Lake Mead levels would jeopardize the water intake for the Las Vegas area. In 2008, Southern Nevada Water Authority began constructing a new water intake at a lower level in Lake Mead. General Manager Pat Mulroy said she did not support water reallocation. Instead, Las Vegas and the Water Authority have worked assiduously on water conservation to support their region's growing population.

Overuse of Lake Mead is not the only issue. There has been a megadrought in the Southwestern US since 2000. In one of the earliest assessments of the impacts of climate change on water resources, a study from the U.S. Environmental Protection Agency in 1993 concluded "the hydrology and water-supply system of the Colorado River Basin are extremely sensitive to climatic changes that could occur over the next several decades. Not only are significant changes in runoff possible, but the ability of the existing water supply system to mitigate the worst effects is limited." More recent studies support this conclusion and indicate climate change will likely decrease the river's flow (from its mid-20th century average) by 20 percent by 2050. A more recent study estimated that rising temperatures reduced the river's flow by around 10% between 2000 and 2021.

When the Colorado River Compact was signed in 1922, no water was reserved for environmental purposes. Using and reusing river water, along with frequent damming, creates an unfavorable environment for native fish species. Dams block fish passage, reduce flood peaks alter natural sediment transported to flood plains and deltas, and change water temperatures – all negatively impacting the natural ecosystem.

Dams and diversions have also significantly degraded the Colorado River Delta, located in Mexico. Once lush and green, a vast ecosystem has nearly disappeared. It was originally estimated to have 17 million acre-feet a year, but before the drought, flows have often been less than a third of that. A coalition of U.S.-based organizations is working with the Mexican government to restore some flows to the delta.

== Estimated flows ==
The amount of water allocated via the compact was based on an expectation that the river's average flow was 16,400,000 acre-feet (20.2 km^{3}) per year (641 m^{3}/s). Subsequent tree ring studies, however, have concluded that the long-term average water flow of the Colorado is significantly less. Estimates have included 13,200,000 acre-feet (16.3 km^{3}) per year (516 m^{3}/s), 13,500,000 acre-feet (16.7 km^{3}) per year (528 m^{3}/s), and 14,300,000 acre-feet (17.6 km^{3}) per year (559 m^{3}/s). Many analysts have concluded that when the compact was negotiated, the period used as the basis for "average" flow of the river (1905–1922) included periods of abnormally high precipitation. The book Science be Dammed finds that politicians and boosters repeatedly ignored engineering estimates of the 1920s that provided lower values of flow.

== Shortages ==
Since 2000, dwindling Colorado River flows and consumption rates in excess of natural replenishment have provoked a need to plan for shortages. Because of its lower priority, shortages should fall primarily upon the users of the Central Arizona Project, however the consequences for some Arizona farmers and urban sectors could be dire. If the federal government acts unilaterally to restrict other water uses, it risks litigation. For these and other reasons, river users are exploring voluntary measures to address shortages.

Some have called for amending or re-interpreting the compact in light of its past deficiencies. The widespread dropping of reservoir levels in the region, in particular at Lake Powell, created by the Glen Canyon Dam in 1963, has prompted calls for the reservoir to be permanently drained and decommissioned, or at least operated to fill only after Lake Mead levels are brought up.

In December 2007, a set of interim guidelines on how to allocate Colorado River water in the event of shortages was signed by the Secretary of the Interior. The guidelines extend through 2026, and, "acknowledging the potential for impacts due to climate change and increased hydrologic variability," interim guidelines provide "the opportunity to gain valuable operating experience for the management of Lake Powell and Lake Mead, particularly for low reservoir conditions...whether during the interim period or thereafter." The agreement specifies three levels of shortage conditions, depending on the level of Lake Mead:

- Light shortage. When the surface elevation at Lake Mead is below 1,075 feet (328 m) relative to mean sea level but above 1,050 feet (320 m), the Lower Basin states will receive 7,167,000 acre-feet (8.840 km^{3}) per year: 4,400,000 acre-feet (5.4 km^{3}) to California, 2,480,000 acre-feet (3.06 km^{3}) to Arizona, and 287,000 acre-feet (0.354 km^{3}) to Nevada.
- Heavy shortage. When the surface elevation of Lake Mead is below 1,050 feet (320 m) but above 1,025 feet (312 m), 7,083,000 acre-feet (8.737 km^{3}) per year will be delivered to the Lower Basin states: 4,400,000 acre-feet (5.4 km^{3}) to California, 2,400,000 acre-feet (3.0 km^{3}) to Arizona, and 283,000 acre-feet (0.349 km^{3}) to Nevada.
- Extreme shortage. The most severe shortage considered in the interim guidelines is when the level of Lake Mead drops below 1,025 feet (312 m). In this event, 7,000,000 acre-feet (8.6 km^{3}) per year will be delivered to the Lower Basin states: 4,400,000 acre-feet (5.4 km^{3}) to California, 2,320,000 acre-feet (2.86 km^{3}) to Arizona, and 280,000 acre-feet (0.35 km^{3}) to Nevada.

A Drought Contingency Plan signed by seven Western states in 2019 used voluntary cutbacks to forestall federal reductions in use of the Colorado River amid a 19-year drought. In May 2023, the states agreed to reduce allocations further temporarily. In June 2023, U. S. Bureau of Reclamation began preparing an Environmental Impact Statement for further modifications of dam operations at Hoover and Glen Canyon to respond to deepening drought conditions.

The Bureau of Reclamation must decide how to manage the system after 2026, when the current operating guidelines expire. In March 2024, Reclamation received five proposals for post-2026 guidelines. By December 2024, Reclamation will publish its draft of the post-2026 guidelines and request public comments. Around December 2025, Reclamation may publish its final version of the post-2026 guidelines. On January 1, 2027, the Interim Guidelines and Drought Contingency Plan, which have jointly managed the Colorado River since 2007, will no longer be in effect. The post-2026 operating guidelines will then determine how Reclamation manages the river.

== Flows to Mexico ==
On November 20, 2012, the International Boundary and Water Commission of the United States and Mexico signed an agreement termed "Minute 319," which updated the Law of the River to address how the 1,500,000 acre-feet (1.9 km^{3}) of Colorado River water that Mexico receives every year would be affected by surplus or drought conditions. Under surplus conditions (when the surface elevation of Lake Mead is above 1,145 feet (349 m) relative to mean sea level) the annual flow to Mexico will increase by 40,000 acre-feet (0.049 km^{3}). In cases where the surface elevation of Lake Mead is higher than that, the extra deliveries to Mexico progressively increase, reaching a maximum of an additional 200,000 acre-feet (0.25 km^{3}) per year.

Minute 319 also specifies that deliveries to Mexico will be reduced under drought conditions. Starting from the base allocation of 1,500,000 acre-feet (1.9 km^{3}) per year, annual deliveries will be reduced by 50,000 acre-feet (0.062 km^{3}) if the surface elevation of Lake Mead is between 1,075 feet (328 m) and 1,050 feet (320 m) above mean sea level; reduced by 70,000 acre-feet (0.086 km^{3}) acre-feet if the elevation is 1,050 feet (320 m) to 1,025 feet (312 m); and reduced by 125,000 acre-feet (0.154 km^{3}) if the surface elevation is below 1,025 feet (312 m).

== See also ==
- Colorado River dispute
- Colorado River Storage Project
- Colorado River Board of California
- Course of the Colorado River
